= Penrith, Cumbria =

Town in Cumbria, England

Coordinates: 54.6648°N 2.7548°W

Penrith
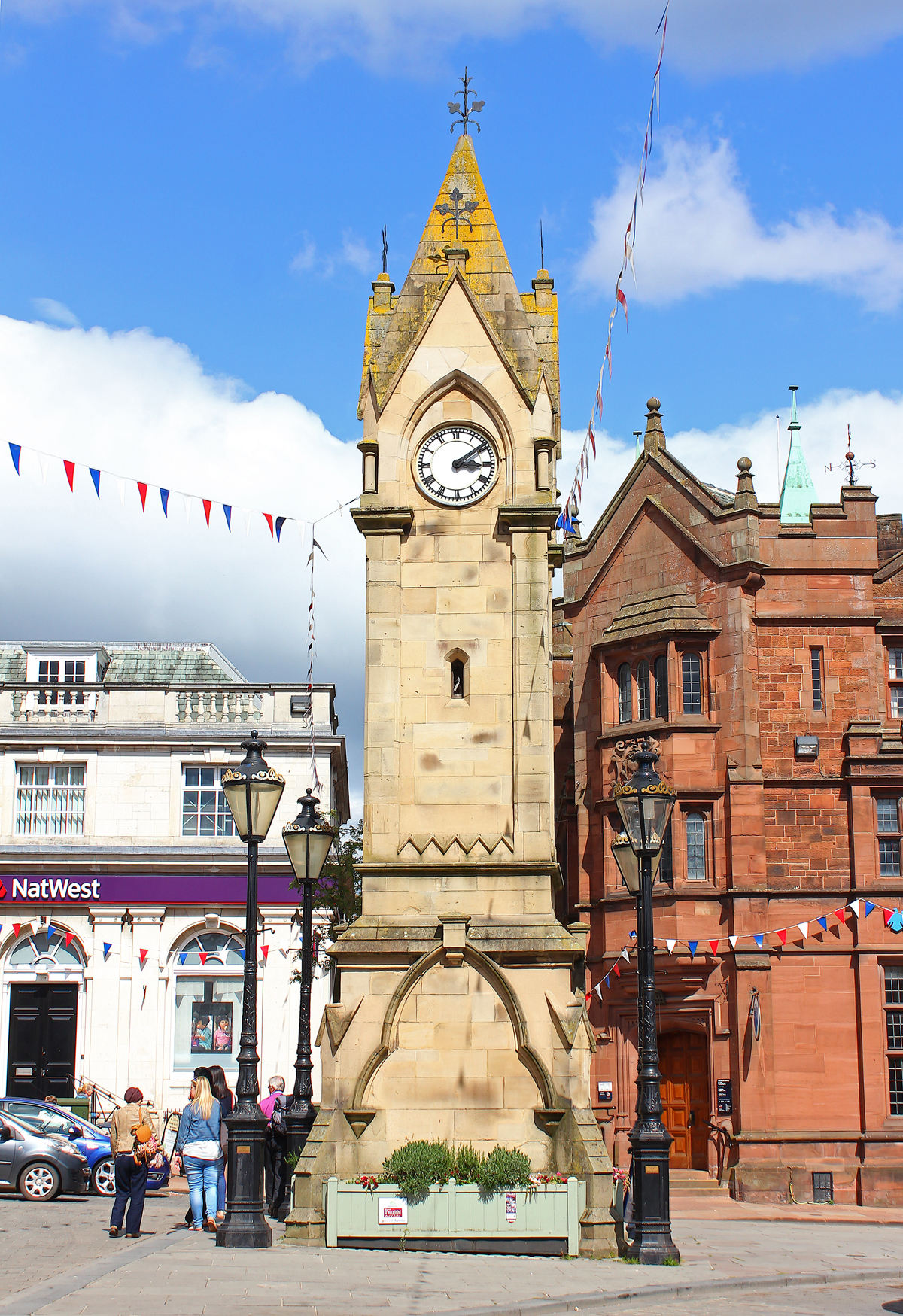
- The Market Square

- Flag

- Location within Cumbria
- Population: 16,987 (Parish, 2021); 16,700 (Built up area, 2021)
- Demonym: Penrithian
- OS grid reference: NY515305
- Unitary authority: Westmorland and Furness
- Ceremonial county: Cumbria
- Region: North West
- Country: England
- Sovereign state: United Kingdom
- Post town: PENRITH
- Postcode district: CA10, CA11
- Dialling code: 01768
- Police: Cumbria
- Fire: Cumbria
- Ambulance: North West
- UK Parliament: Penrith and Solway

Penrith (/ˈpɛnrɪθ/, /pɛnˈrɪθ/) is a market town and civil parish in the Westmorland and Furness unitary authority area of Cumbria, England. It is less than 3 miles (5 km) outside the Lake District National Park and about 17 miles (27 km) south of Carlisle. It is between the Rivers Petteril and Eamont and just north of the River Lowther. It was historically part of Cumberland. The parish had a population of 16,987 at the 2021 census.

Penrith's history has been defined primarily by its strategic position on vital north–south and east–west communications routes. This was especially important in its early history, when the Romans established two forts nearby at Brocavum and at Voreda (Plumpton). It was also vital later on when Anglo-Scottish relations were fraught. Furthermore, Penrith was a Crown possession in its early phase, though often granted to favoured noble families. It did not become a chartered borough or a municipal corporation and had no representation in Parliament in any modern democratic sense until the 19th century. Other factors in its growth were from its proximity to the Inglewood Forest and to the fertile Eden valley. The town depended mostly upon agriculture, especially cattle rearing and droving. It lacked the resources to become an industrial hub, despite its road and rail infrastructure. Its proximity to the Lake District, the Eden valley, the North Pennines and to centres such as Carlisle encouraged tourism and commuting. As a result, the hospitality and retailing sectors became important.

== History ==
=== Toponymy ===
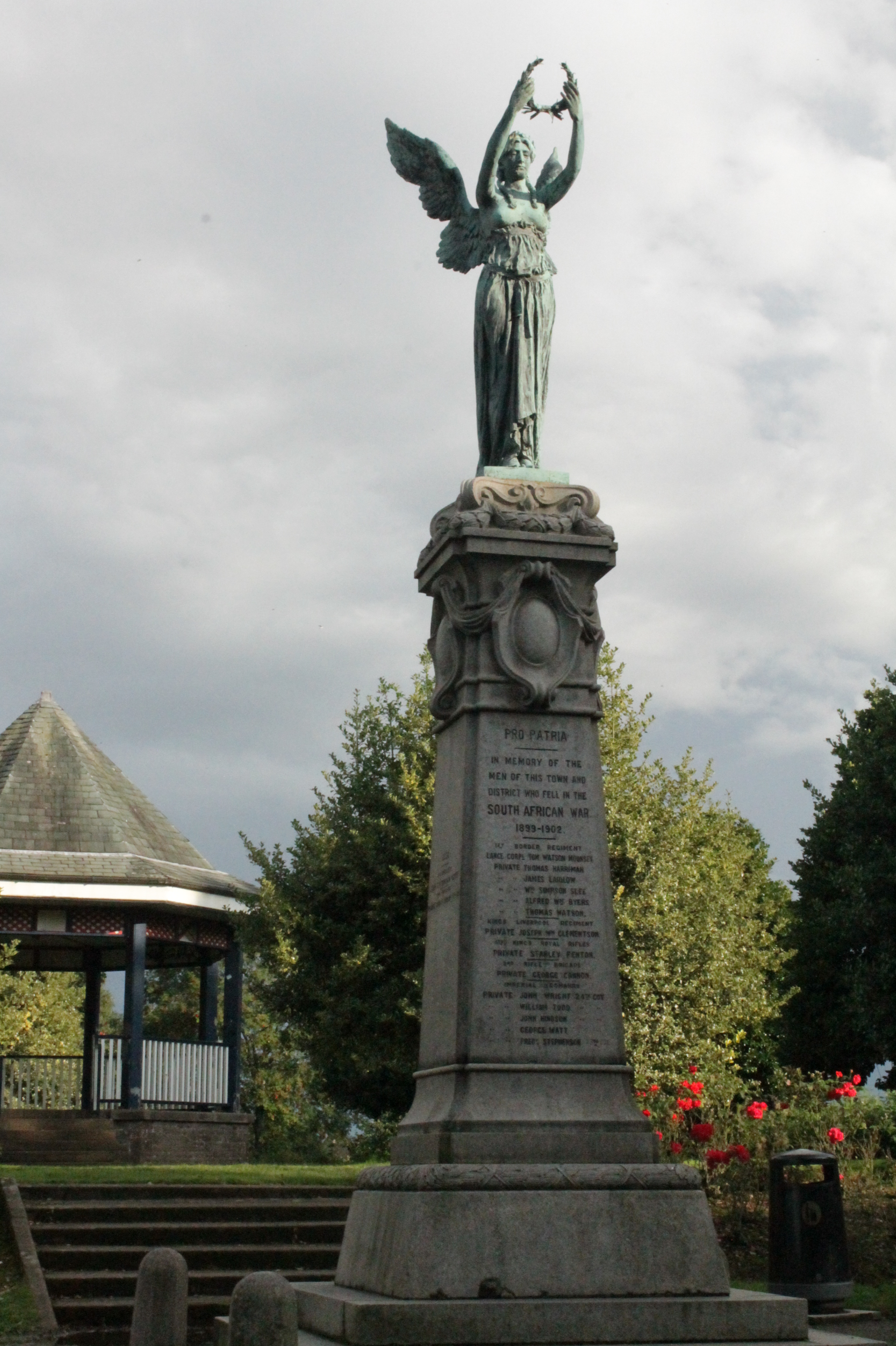
Penrith War Memorial to Boer War by F W Doyle Jones

The toponymy of "Penrith" has been debated. Several writers argue for the Cumbric or Welsh pen "head, chief, end" (both noun and adjective) with the Cumbric rid, Welsh rhyd "ford", to mean "chief ford", "hill ford", "ford end", or Whaley's suggestion: "the head of the ford" or "headland by the ford".

The centre of Penrith, however, lies about 1 mile (1.6 km) from the nearest crossing of the River Eamont at Eamont Bridge. An alternative has been suggested consisting of the same pen element meaning "head, end, top" + the equivalent of Welsh rhudd "crimson". Research on the medieval spelling variants of Penrith also suggests this alternative toponymy. The name "red hill" may refer to Beacon Hill, to the north-east of today's town. There is also a place called Redhills to the south-west, near the M6 motorway, and a place called Penruddock, about 6 miles (9.7 km) west of Penrith. These names all reflect the local geology, as red sandstone is abundant in the area and was used for many buildings in Penrith.

=== Prehistory ===
The origins of Penrith go far back in time. There is archaeological evidence of "early, concentrated and continuous settlement" in the area. (Note: Mullett (2017a), p. 5.) The Neolithic (c. 4500–2350 BCE) or early-Bronze Age (c. 2500–1000 BCE) sites at nearby Mayburgh Henge, King Arthur's Round Table, Little Round Table, Long Meg and Her Daughters, and Little Meg, and the stone circles at Leacet Hill and, a little further away, at the Shap Stone Avenue and at Oddendale are some of the visible traces of "one of the most important groups of prehistoric ritual sites in the region." In addition there have been various finds (stone axes, hammers, knives) and carvings found in the Penrith area. (Note: Mullett (2017a), p. 5.)

For the Celtic (Iron Age) era (c. 800 BCE – 100 CE), nearby Clifton Dykes has been proposed as the centre of the Carvetti tribe, due to the large enclosure discovered there and assumptions about the strategic position of the Penrith area in the communications systems running north–south through the Eden Valley and east–west across Stainmore.

=== Roman period ===
General view of Roman road looking south

Penrith itself was not established by the Romans, but they recognised the strategic importance of the place, especially near the confluence of the rivers Eamont and Lowther, where the Roman road crossing the Pennines (the present A66) came through. In doing so, they built the fort at Brougham (Brocavum) along with another road (the present A6) going north over Beacon Hill to the large fort at Plumpton (Voreda) – and from there northwards to Carlisle (Luguvallium). (Note: Mullett (2017a), pp. 7–12.) Brocavum may also have been built in order to have a military presence close to the centre of the Carvetti.

The Roman fort of Voreda occupied the site now known as Old Penrith, five miles north of the town. The 18th-century antiquarian and vicar of Penrith, Dr.Hugh Todd, speculated that the Ala I Petriana may have been stationed there, giving its name to the subsequent town, (Note: Mullett (2017a), p. 3.) but see the "Toponymy" section above.

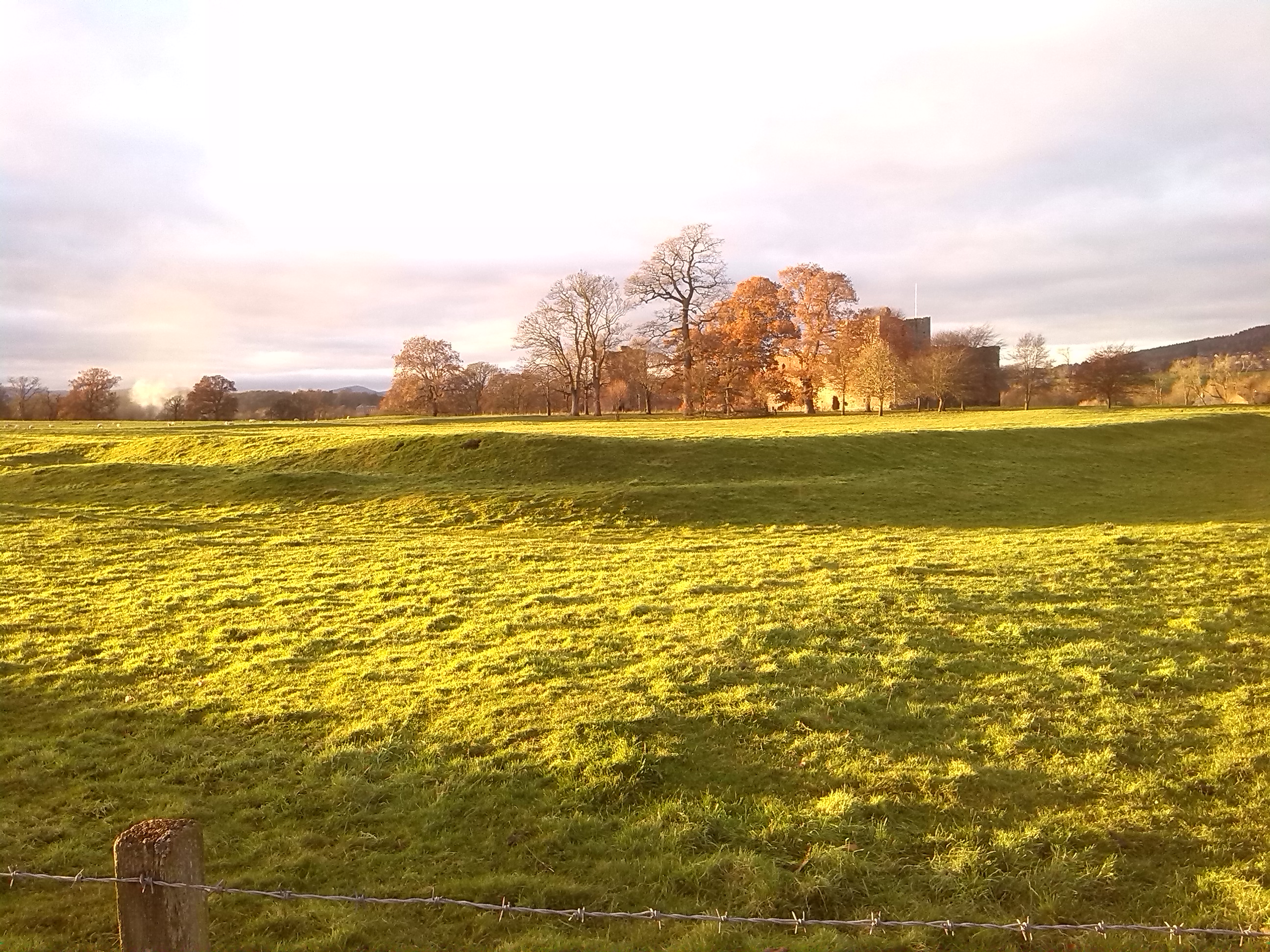
Banks of Brocavum Roman fort in foreground, Brougham Castle behind, and 18th-century Carleton Hall to the left

The Roman road from Manchester to Carlisle ran through the area. Excavations before an extension to Penrith Cemetery showed the road had survived better at the edges of the field. The cobble and gravel surfaces seemed to have been ploughed out at the centre. The road was constructed by excavating a wide, shallow trench below subsoil level. Large cobbles were probably obtained nearby, as they did not appear frequently in the subsoil in the excavated area. They were added to the excavated subsoil dumped back into the cut to form a stable foundation, canted at the centre of the road.

The two forts close to where Penrith is today would have had a vicus, an ad-hoc civilian settlement nearby, where farmers supplying food to the forts, and traders and others supplying goods and services lived and died. There is evidence of continuous settlement throughout the Roman period and into the post-Roman era. (Note: Mullett (2017a), pp. 10–12.)

=== Early medieval period ===
Following the departure of the Romans (c. 450 CE), the north became a patchwork of warring Celtic tribes (Hen Ogledd). One of these may have been Rheged, perhaps with a centre in the Eden valley and covering the area formerly held by the Carvetti. However, this has been disputed by historians. The Rheged Centre, just outside Penrith, commemorates the name.

During the 7th century, the region was invaded by the Angles, a Germanic tribe which moved west from Northumbria. The Celtic place-names in the region such as Penrith, Blencow, Culgaith, Penruddock, were now joined by settlements ending in "-ham" (estate) and "-ton" (farm), such as Askham, Barton, Clifton, Plumpton and Stainton. (Note: Mullett (2017a), pp. 14–15.)

From about 870, the area became subject to Viking settlement by Norse from Dublin and the Hebrides, along with Danes from Yorkshire. Settlements with names ending in "-by" ("village") and "-thorpe" ("hamlet") were largely on higher ground – the Vikings were pastoralists, the Angles arable farmers. Examples are Melkinthorpe, Langwathby, Lazonby, and Ousby. Little and Great Dockray (not to be confused with the nearby village Dockray) in Penrith itself are Norse names. (Note: Mullett (2017a), pp. 16–17.)

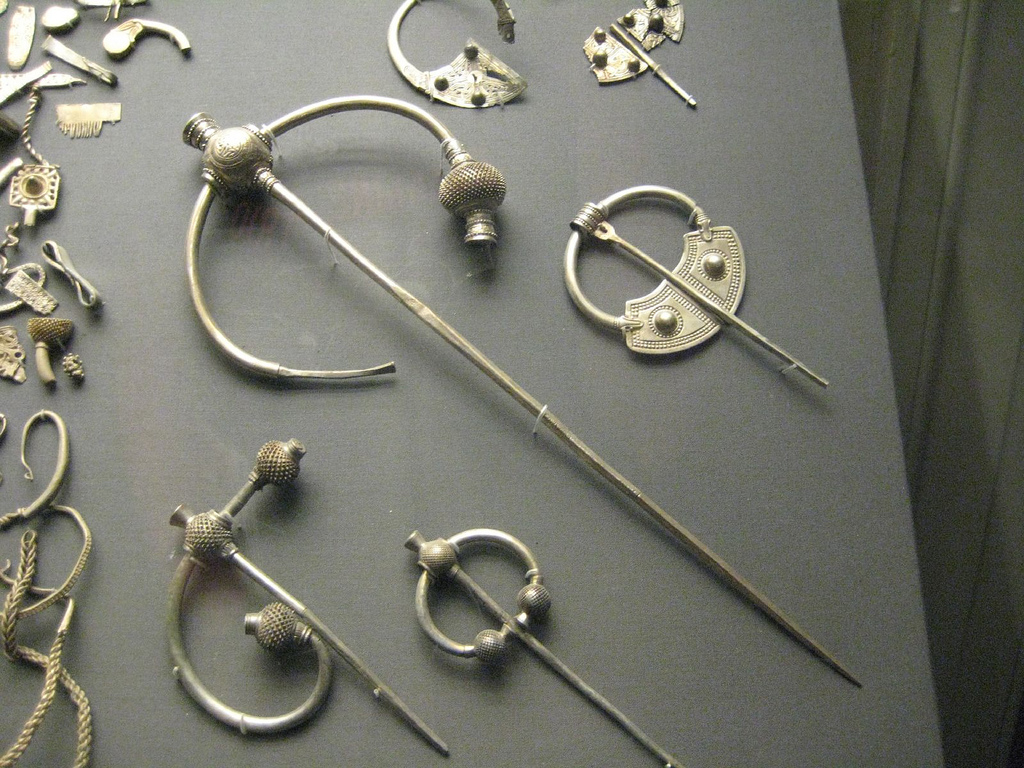
Fibulae from the Penrith Hoard, 10th century

The Penrith Hoard of Viking silver brooches was found in the Eden valley at Flusco Pike, Penrith, as were 253 pieces of silver at Lupton.

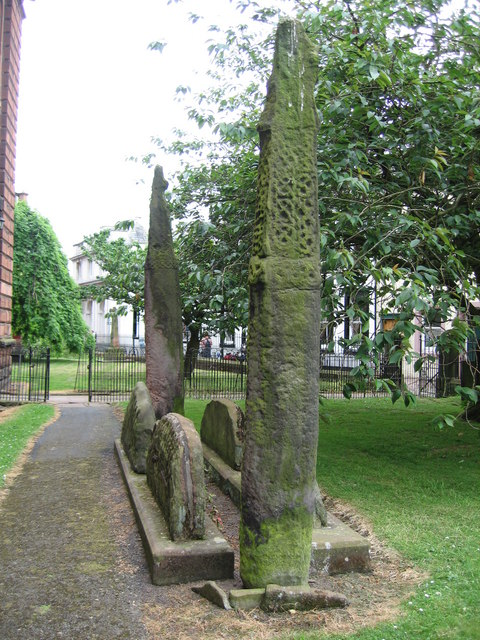
'Giant's Grave', St. Andrew's churchyard, Penrith, an unusual arrangement of two Viking-age cross-shafts with four hogbacks (in the foreground). In addition, there is a smaller, Viking-age, wheel-headed cross just visible in the background (the "Giant's Thumb"). The group might commemorate either the gathering of kings in 927 or Owain of Strathclyde.

Two cross-shafts and four hogbacks, along with a small cross found immediately to the west of St Andrew's Church, known as the "Giant's Grave" and "Giant's Thumb" (c. 920s), have long prompted speculation. They may have been separate items brought together by an antiquary, or they may be a genuine group. They appear to be an Anglo-Norse fusion of Christian and Norse motifs, but it is still debated whether they are linked to the King of the Strathclyde Cumbrians, Owain ap Dyfnwal (fl. 934). (Note: Mullett (2017a), p. 32.) It is thought that Strathclyde British had settled in parts of north Cumbria in the 10th century. (Note: Mullett (2017a), pp. 29–31.)

On 12 July 927, Eamont Bridge (or possibly the monastery at Dacre, or the site of the old Roman fort at Brougham or even the church at Penrith, or a combination of these) was the scene of a gathering of kings from throughout Britain as recorded in the Anglo-Saxon Chronicle and the histories of William of Malmesbury and John of Worcester. Present were: Athelstan, King of the Anglo-Saxons and then of the English; Constantín mac Áeda (Constantine II), King of Scots; Owain of Strathclyde, King of the Cumbrians; Hywel Dda, King of Wales; and Ealdred son of Eadulf, Lord of Bamburgh. Athelstan took the submission of some of these other kings, presumably to form some sort of coalition against the Vikings. The growing power of the Scots, and perhaps of the Strathclyders, may have persuaded Athelstan to move north and attempt to define the boundaries of the various kingdoms. This is generally taken as the date of foundation of the Kingdom of England, whose northern boundary was the Eamont river, with Westmorland being outside the control of Strathclyde. Penrith was effectively held by the Scottish king, as overlord of the Strathclyde Cumbrians, until the Norman takeover in 1092. Thereafter, Penrith's fortunes varied according to the state of play between England and Scotland over ownership of Cumberland, Westmorland and Northumbria.

Penrith itself may have been founded before the arrival of the Normans. A ditched oval enclosure, surrounding the area now occupied by St Andrew's Church (a burh – hence "Burrowgate"), has been excavated. A church on the site may date back to the time of Bishop Wilfrid, (c. 670s) whose patron saint was Saint Andrew. (Note: Mullett (2017a), pp. 33–34.)

=== Later medieval period: Normans and Plantagenets ===
The Norman conquest of north Cumbria took place in 1092 under William Rufus, who retained Carlisle, Penrith and some other manors round Penrith as demesne. (Note: Mullett (2017a), p. 35.) The Norman and Plantagenet rulers thereafter held Penrith as a crown estate ("Penred Regis"), along with a group of others locally, including Carlatton, Castle Sowerby, Gamblesby, Glassonby, Langwathby, Great Salkeld, Little Salkeld and Scotby. The group became known as the "Queen's Hames" ("Queen's Homes") from 1330 onwards. (Note: Mullett (2017a), pp. 37–39.)

Membership of the group fluctuated over time. In 1187 a sub-set including Penrith, Langwathby, Great Salkeld, Gamblesby, Glassonby and Scotby was referred to as the Honour of Penrith. (Note: Mullett (2017a), p. 40.) From 1242 to 1295, the Honour of Penrith (created "the liberty of Penrith" by the Treaty of York in 1237) was in the hands of the King of Scots, in return for renouncing his claims to Northumberland, Cumberland and Westmorland. King Henry III had been reluctant to cede Penrith to the Scots, as it was a good source of Crown income: the right to hold a market and fair was granted in 1223 by Henry, and arable farming produced good yields and taxes. (Note: Mullett (2017a), pp. 44–55.) Tensions between the English Crown's agents in Cumberland and the Scottish agents, attempting to defend the rights of the Scottish king and his tenants in the liberty of Penrith, may have influenced the mindset of the Scots leading up to the outbreak of the Wars of Scottish Independence.

King Edward I took Penrith and the other manors back into Crown possession (having been taken from the Scots and given to Bishop Anthony Bek). (Note: Mullett (2017a), pp. 56–63.) Perhaps to underline the authority of the Crown, Edward also established an Augustinian Friary in 1291. This succumbed to the Reformation in 1539. The Friarage house was built on the site in 1717. (Note: Mullett (2017a), pp. 64–65.)

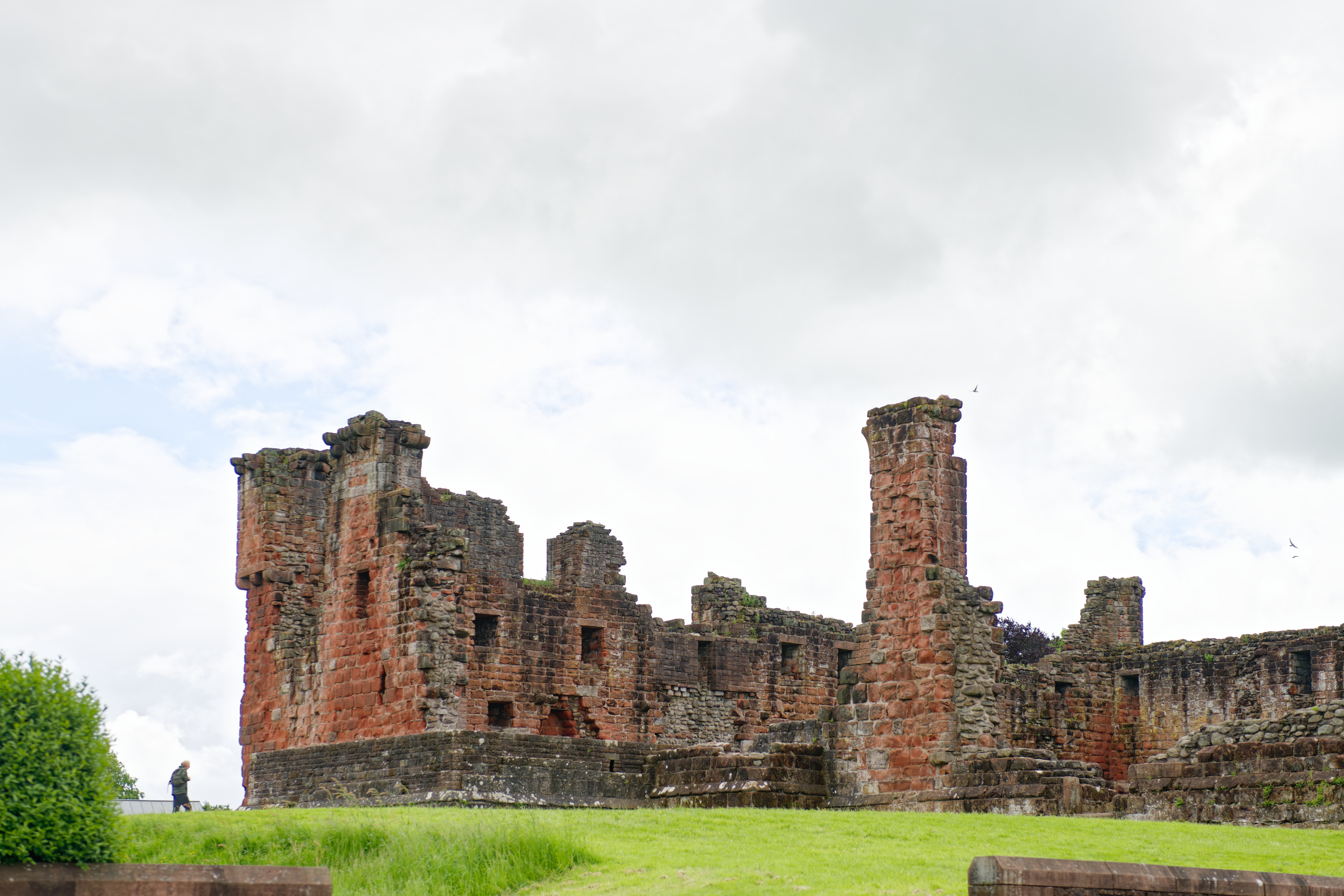
Penrith Castle

With the Wars of Scottish Independence, Penrith suffered destruction by Scottish forces in 1296 (William Wallace) and in 1314, 1315–1316 and 1322 (Robert the Bruce). Meanwhile, climatic change caused poor harvests. Penrith went from incipient economic growth in the early 14th century to poverty by the third decade. (Note: Mullett (2017a), pp. 66–76.) Recovery in the 1330s was again reversed by the devastating Scottish raid of 1345 (David II of Scotland) and the Black Death of 1348–1349 and subsequent years. However, Penrith, Castle Sowerby and the other manors were valuable as a source of royal income, paying debts the Crown owed to those leading the fight against the Scots, such as Roger de Leybourne, Anthony de Lucy and Andrew Harclay, 1st Earl of Carlisle. (Note: Mullett (2017a), pp. 66–88.)

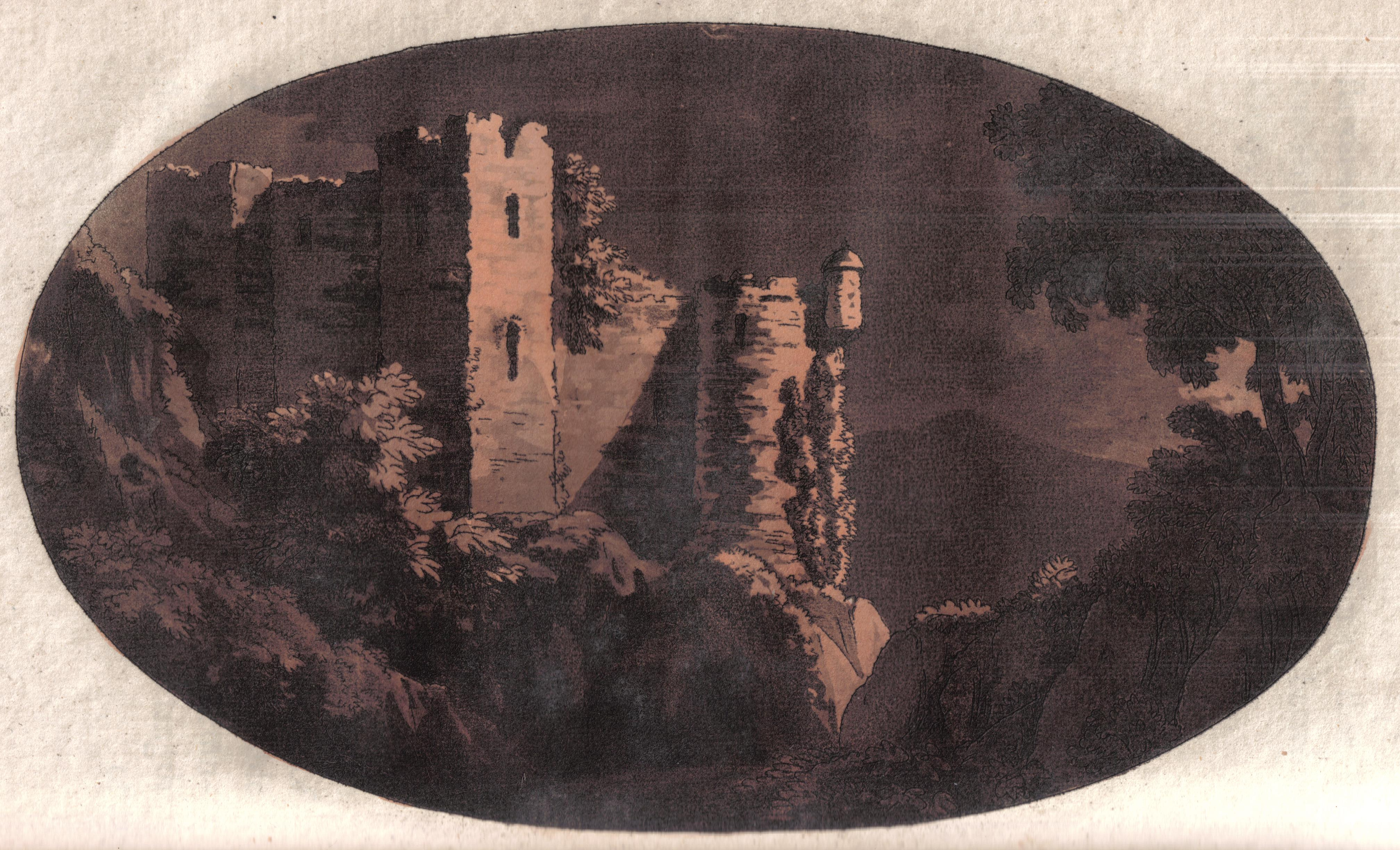
Penrith Castle in 1772, built 1399–1470.

There is evidence of a protective wall built round the town after the Scottish raid of 1345. This was strengthened in 1391 by the townspeople and Penrith's patron, William Strickland, Bishop of Carlisle, after another Scottish raid by the 1st Earl of Douglas in 1380, and others in 1383 and 1388, when Brougham Castle was probably destroyed as well. (Note: Mullett (2017a), pp. 90–97.) It is thought that Strickland built and strengthened the "pele tower" in Benson Row, behind Hutton Hall. He also endowed a chantry (1395) in St Andrew's Church, (where the chantry priest may have taught music and grammar), and created Thacka Beck, diverting clean water from the River Petteril, which was notably valuable for the tanning and related industries. (Note: Mullett (2017a), pp. 93–105.)

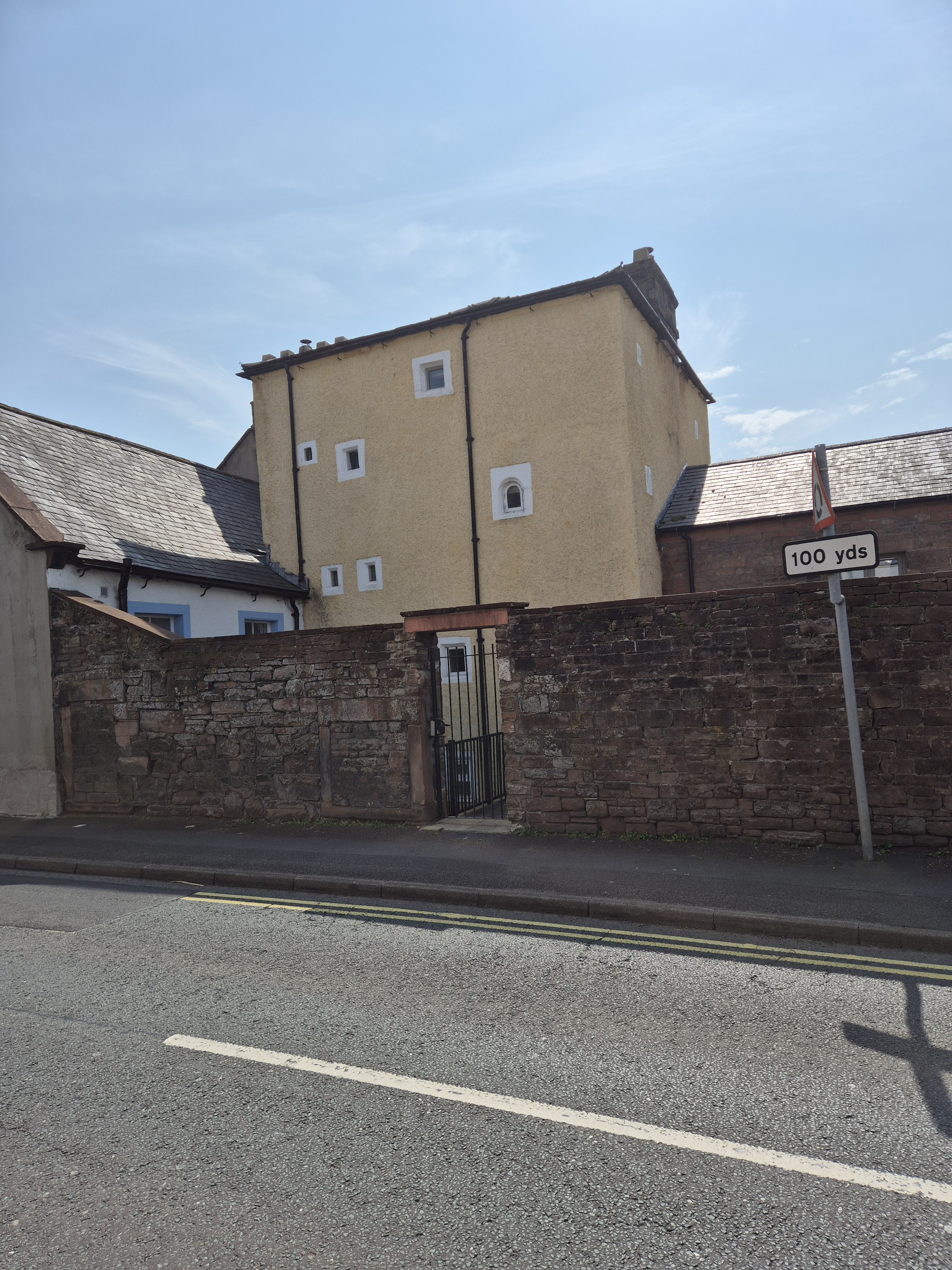
(Probably) Bishop Strickland's pele tower (14th century) located behind Hutton Hall

Strickland shared power in Penrith with the Neville family, which had been promoted in the North by Richard II of England to offset the influence of the Percies. In 1396, Ralph Neville, 1st Earl of Westmorland, and his wife Joan gained the manors of Penrith and Castle Sowerby: windows in St Andrew's Church may depict the Nevilles along with Richard II. Ralph probably started building Penrith Castle, which was continued by his son, Richard Neville, 5th Earl of Salisbury, father of Richard Neville, 16th Earl of Warwick, the "Kingmaker". The latter's death in the Battle of Barnet in 1471 led Edward IV of England to grant the Castle and Penrith manors to Richard of Gloucester, the future Richard III, in order to keep them Yorkist. Richard used Penrith as a base against the Scots and to promote a Yorkist "affinity" in the area to offset Lancastrian loyalties at nearby Brougham and Appleby (Clifford) and Greystoke (Baron Greystoke) and elsewhere. Tradition (with no firm evidence) has Richard staying in what is now Dockray Hall (once the Gloucester Arms) during building work on the castle. The latter was more of a palace than a military stronghold, with a chantry chapel endowed by Richard. (Note: Mullett (2017a), pp. 106–126.)

=== Early modern period (1485–1714) ===
==== Tudor period ====
The Tudor period saw the centralising tendencies of the Yorkist government continued. The English Reformation, economic and social progress, educational change, the rise of the non-noble landed gentry and the depredations of the plague all affected Tudor England, and Penrith was no exception. (Note: Mullett (2017b), pp. 7–11.)

The eclipse of the Nevilles and Percies by the end of the Wars of the Roses opened the field for families such as the Cliffords, the Dacres and the Musgraves to jostle for positions of power in the North (including those of the Sheriff of Cumberland, the Warden of the West March and the keeper of Penrith Castle). (Note: Mullett (2017b), pp. 15–21.)

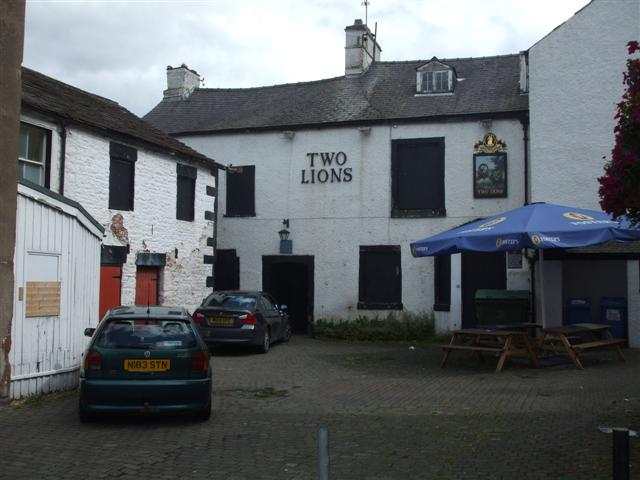
The former Two Lions, Penrith – previously the townhouse of Gerard Lowther called Newhall

Penrith people were involved in a rebellion of 1536/1537 known as the Pilgrimage of Grace. Eight town residents were executed as a result. The motives seem to have been partly religious and partly to do with a desire for more English government protection against Scottish raids. (Note: Mullett (2017b), pp. 26–35.)

The Reformation went on apace afterwards – the Augustinian Priory was dissolved and the two chantry bequests closed later. The Strickland bequest partly funded the Penrith Grammar School, founded 1564, in the reign of Elizabeth I. Many governors of the new foundation in St Andrew's churchyard were rising Protestant gentry, who moved into various houses in Penrith: the families of Whelpdale (whose coat of arms adorns Dockray Hall), Carleton, Bost and Hutton (who had taken over the pele tower in Benson Row), and Richard Dudley of Yanwath Hall. The foundation was overseen by Sir Thomas Smith, one of Elizabeth's trusted Protestant counsellors.

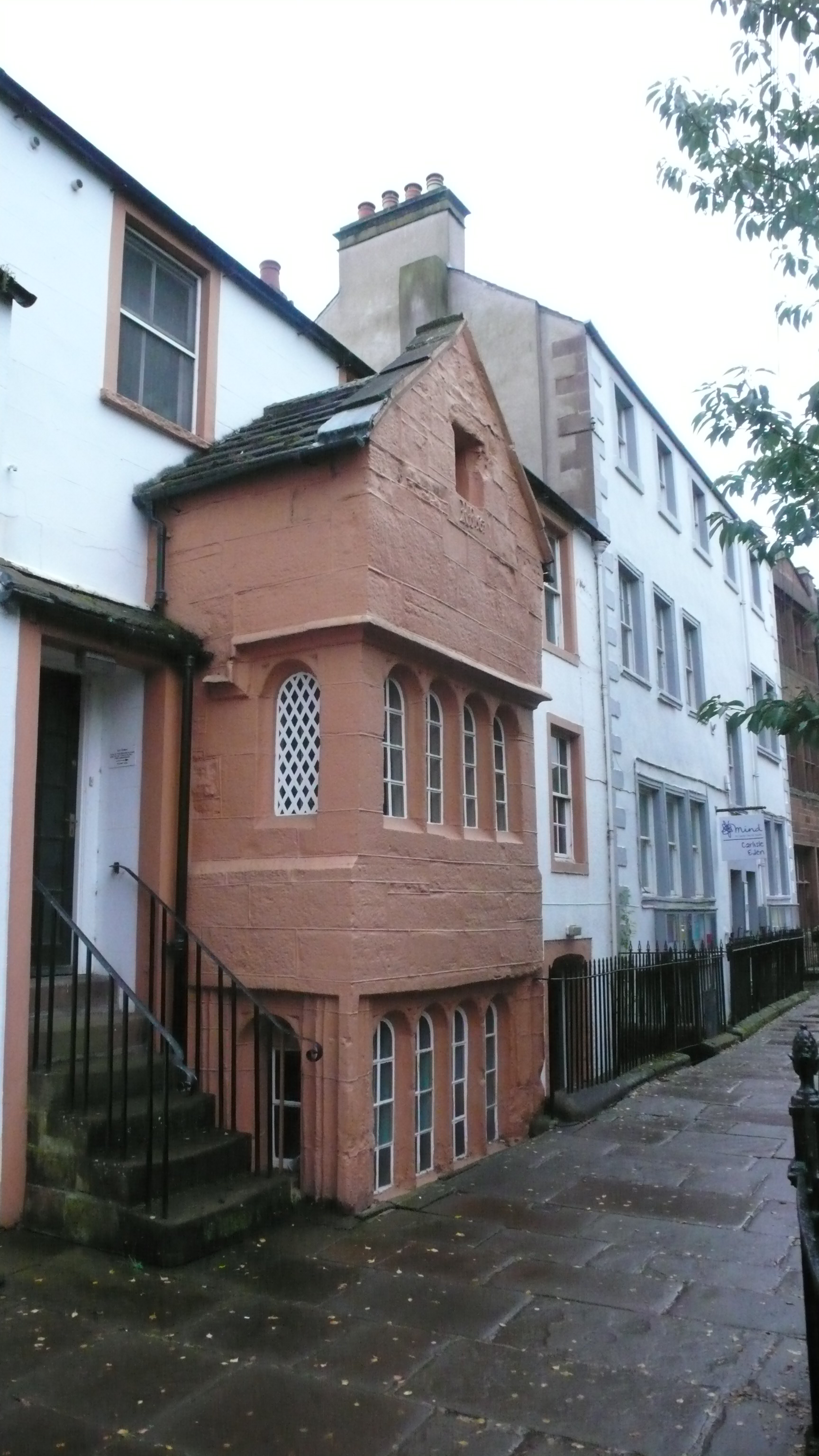
Tudor House – "... incorporates a survival of the earliest domestic architecture in Penrith."

Penrith was not involved in the Rising of the North in 1569, despite involvement by Sir Richard Lowther and his younger brother Gerard, whose house in Penrith later became the former Two Lions Inn. The merchant, Robert Bartram, may have built the Tudor House in St Andrew's Place (1563), indicating a trading class operating in Penrith. (Note: Mullett (2017b), pp. 41–98.)

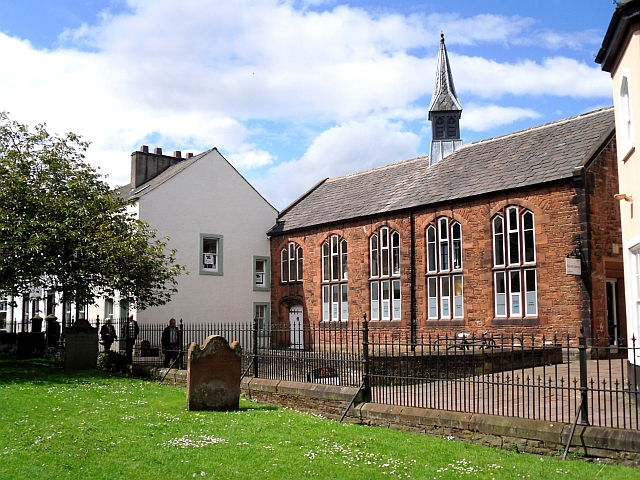
Former Grammar School, now the public library. Original building underwent restoration in 1857

However, there may have been a substantial underclass as well. A typhus epidemic in 1587 caused a high death rate, exacerbated by possible poverty and poor nutrition. The Bubonic plague may have caused some 615 deaths in 1597–1598, according to the vicar's register (2,260 according to a brass plaque inside St Andrew's Church). (Note: Mullett (2017b), pp. 99–125.)

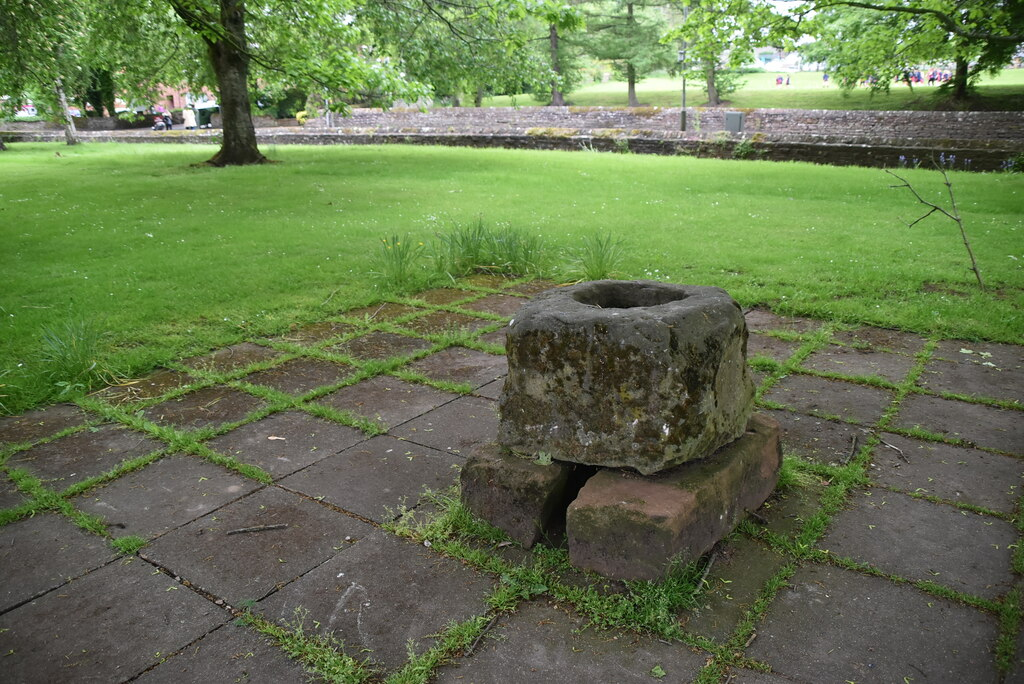
Plague Stone, Tynefield Drive. Coins were washed in vinegar here prior to use during times of plague. The stone appears to be the base of a former cross.

==== Stuart period ====
Penrith in Stuart times was affected by political and religious upheavals that saw the English Civil War, the Commonwealth and the Glorious Revolution, but was spared any fighting. It also escaped the witch-craze phenomenon that afflicted other parts of England. The Union of the Crowns and suppression of the reiver clans such as the Grahams, gave Penrith relief from Scottish raiding and a boost to Penrith's commercial prosperity. James VI and I and his entourage of 800 visited Brougham Castle in 1617, which boosted commerce. However, Penrith's crossroads position on the north–south and east–west routes made it vulnerable to starving vagrants bringing disease. This, plus a national food shortage, may have led to a typhus epidemic in 1623. (Note: Mullett (2018), pp. 5–18.)

During the Civil War, Penrith's gentry were mostly Royalist, but Penrithians seem to have been neither for nor against the King. During the First English Civil War (1642–1646), General Leslie took over Brougham Castle for the Covenanters, and Penrith became a supply centre for Parliament. In the Second English Civil War starting in 1648, Brougham and Penrith castles were strategic assets. Major-General Lambert, the Parliamentary commander, took over Penrith in June 1648 until forced out by Scottish royalists aided by Sir Philip Musgrave of Edenhall. The Covenanters supported the future Charles II after 1648. He stayed at Carleton Hall in 1651 on his way south to defeat at the Battle of Worcester. (Note: Mullett (2018), pp. 25–31.)

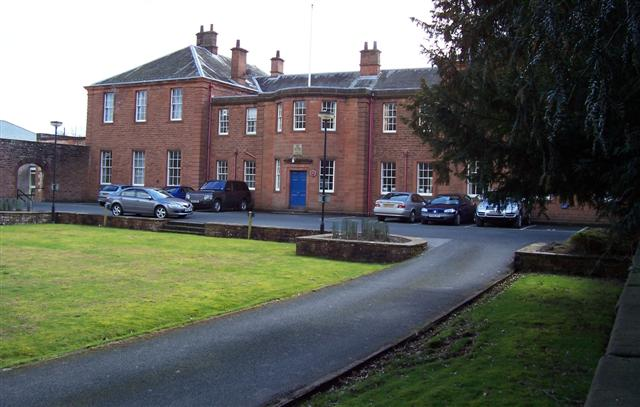
Carleton Hall – now Cumbria Police HQ

Because Penrith lacked borough or corporation status, governance fell on the local nobility, gentry and clergy, (such as Hugh Todd). During the Commonwealth, Presbyterian "Godly rule" was administered at St Andrew's Church by the local Justice of the peace, Thomas Langhorne, who had bought Lowther's Newhall/Two Lions house. (Note: Mullett (2018), pp. 32–41.) Meanwhile, Penrith benefited from work on restoration of Brougham and other castles, and by charitable donations undertaken by Lady Anne Clifford. (Note: Mullett (2018), pp. 67–76.) The gradual rise in religious toleration eventually saw in 1699 the establishment, by the Quakers, of Penrith's second place of worship, the Friends' Meeting House in Meeting House Lane. (Note: Mullett (2018), pp. 101–102.)

Leading gentry of Cumberland and Westmorland gathered at the George Inn on 4 January 1688 at the behest of Lord Preston, the Lord Lieutenant of Cumberland and Westmorland. He was attempting to gauge the views of leading figures in the counties (deputy-lieutenants, and J.P.s) on the intention of King James II to introduce greater religious toleration. Partly due to efforts by John Lowther, 1st Viscount Lonsdale, the attendees were persuaded to give a non-committal reply. The Whig Lowther went on to contribute to securing the two counties for King William in the Glorious Revolution and advancing his career, unlike his local (Tory) rival Christopher Musgrave of Edenhall who had been more dilatory in his support for William. This exemplified local politics feeding into national politics. (Note: Mullett (2018), pp. 83-96.)

The economy of Penrith "continued to rely on cattle rearing, slaughtering and the processing of cattle products" (leather goods, tanning, shoemaking). (Note: Mullett (2018), pp. 103–104.)

=== Georgian and Victorian period (1715–1901) ===
==== A Georgian "middle-ranking country town" (1715–1800) ====
The repercussions of the Glorious Revolution continued to have an effect on Penrith as its citizens were caught up in the subsequent Jacobite rising of 1715 and the later rising of 1745 – another consequence of the town's position on major travel routes. In 1715, the local posse comitatus and militia, under the command of Viscount Lonsdale and Bishop Nicolson of Carlisle, failed to stop the southwards-heading Jacobite force on Beacon Fell (not wooded in those days). There is little evidence of pro-Jacobite sympathy in Penrith at the time. The Jacobite army's overnight billeting in the town was peaceful, however. (Note: Mullett (2019), pp.39-59) The 1745 incursion saw Prince Charles Edward Stuart staying at the George in Devonshire Street on November 21 during the Jacobite army's route south through England. Local animosity towards the Jacobites' "living off the land" broke out and there was a disturbance at Lowther Hall. After the retreat from Derby, the pro-Hanoverian sentiment of Penrithians showed itself in the so-called "Sunday hunting" harassment of the Scots by local forces, along with delaying tactics at Thrimby. With the Prince back again in Penrith on 21 December, elements of the army of Prince William, Duke of Cumberland caught up with the retreating Jacobites at Clifton Moor, supposedly the last military engagement on English soil. (Note: Mullett (2019), pp.79-109)

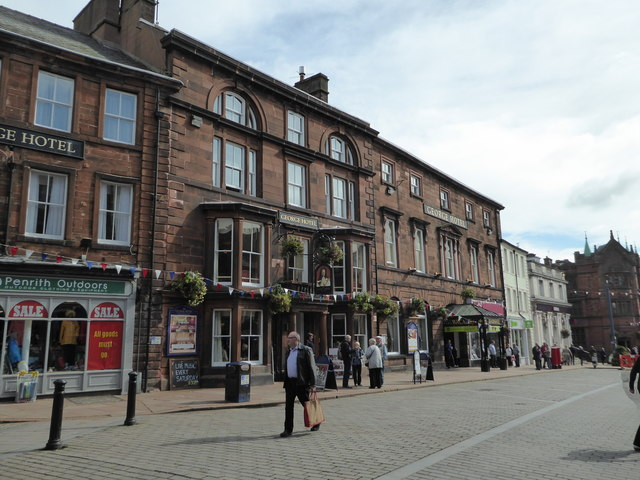
The George Hotel

Penrith in the eighteenth century had approximately 2,000 rising to 4,000 people. (Note: Mullett (2019), p.17) According to Scott, "The expansion of the population during the latter half of the 18th century was a response to improvements in agriculture and transport and to the growth of Penrith as a market centre, which led to a reduction in Malthusian poverty and an increase in the level of the population that could be sustained".

The town was still governed by the landed aristocracy, many of whom built town houses (often in the Palladian style) during this period: Hutton Hall (c. 1720), and the Mansion House (c. 1750) being examples. (Note: Mullett (2019), pp.9-11) St Andrew's Church was also subject to change. The nave of the old medieval church was totally demolished and re-built (1722), partly because it was deemed to be beyond repair, partly to prevent the increasingly prevalent private take-over of space by local landowning families, and partly to improve the accommodation, and better to fit the changed liturgical practice and artistic views of the period. (Note: Mullett (2019), pp.61-78)

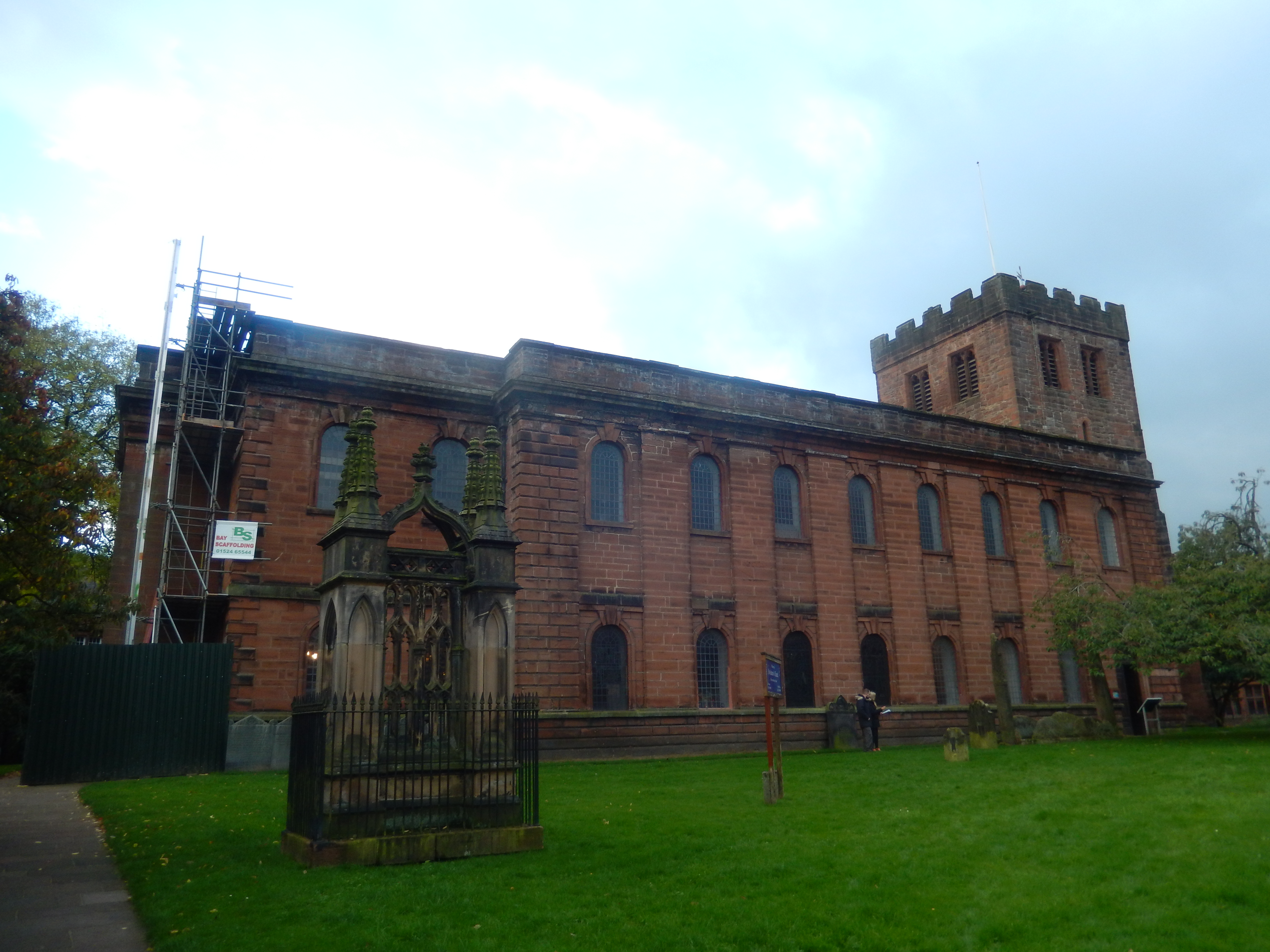
St Andrew's Church, Penrith. 12th-13th-century tower with 15th-century top stage; nave built 1721-1722

Penrith was, in the words of Professor Michael Mullett, a "middle-ranking country town". (Note: Mullett (2019), p.250) Industrialization failed to make any headway during this time (lacking "the power resources, raw materials and social structure for a major industrial take-off"). (Note: Mullett (2019), p.250) The economy continued to rely on agriculture, services and marketing geared towards the local vicinity. (Note: Mullett (2019), p.17-38) As the century wore on, tourism joined this list, encouraged by interest in Penrith's prehistoric and medieval past and in Romanticism. (Note: Mullett (2019), pp.121-138) There was some small-scale manufacturing taking place in Penrith during the Georgian period: clockmaking; tanning; pewter wares; and textiles (gingham fabric, check-patterned fabric, linen). However, the textile industry in Penrith could not compete with the great textile towns of Yorkshire and Lancashire. (Note: Mullett(2019), pp.23-25,30) The advent of turnpike roads, (Note: Mullett (2019), pp.113-120) operated by turnpike trusts, aided the movement of goods and people between Penrith and other prominent towns. Penrith was a stopping point on stage-coach routes from London or Manchester to Scotland. (Note: Mullett (2019), pp.118)

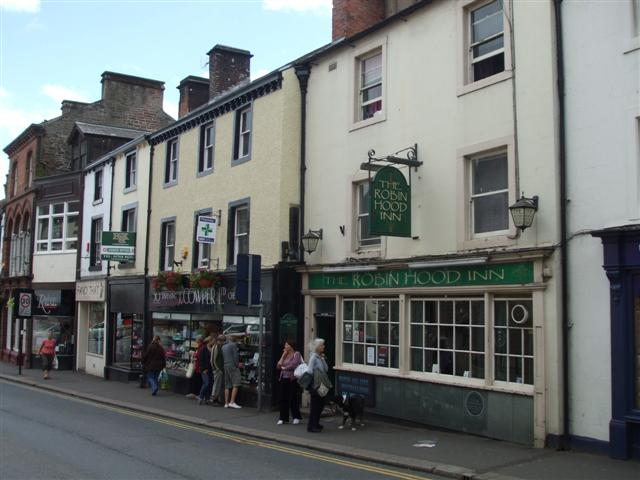
The Robin Hood Inn, Penrith. It was here that William Wordsworth nursed his dying friend, Raisley Calvert, in 1794.

Urban renewal was a feature of eighteenth-century Penrith, acting out in the context of two visions. On one hand were those who looked to a future town that would attract the wider trade and tourism as well as increasing shopping and retailing opportunities. These were led by William Cavendish, 5th Duke of Devonshire who had bought the Honour of Penrith from his brother-in-law (William Cavendish-Bentinck, 3rd Duke of Portland). On the other hand were those who saw the future as one that concentrated on the local market(s). The chaotic, congested, smelly nature of the latter was not conducive to the former. A compromise was achieved: the old Shambles, Moot Hall and Market Cross were repositioned and the centre of town was made less obstructive and obnoxious. (Note: Mullett (2019), pp.139-150)

Overall, Penrith society remained one characterised by a manorial system dominated by aristocratic elites, backed by the Church of England, albeit with challenges in the form of jostling for power in the former (the Lowther versus the Bentinck political struggles, for example) and the rise of Wesleyan Methodism. The Toleration Act 1688 enabled alternative religious practices to feature in Penrith, but small Quaker and declining Presbyterian and Catholic representation did not seriously challenge the status quo. (Note: Mullett (2019), pp.151-199)

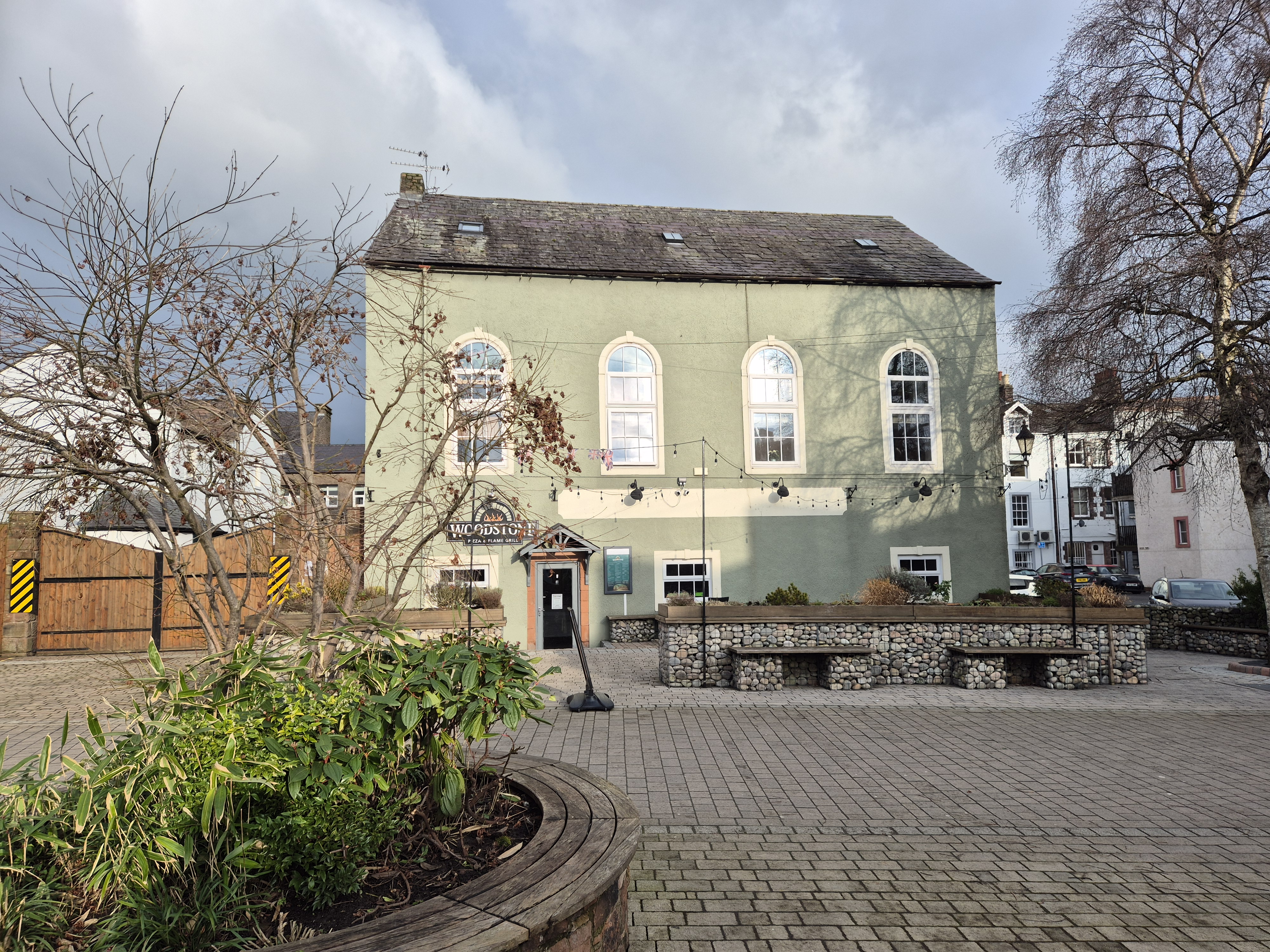
Former Presbyterian chapel (built 1785)

Typical of Georgian England was Penrith's disparity in wealth between the upper and lower classes. The poor in Penrith were often on the breadline. Agricultural depression (1730–50), cattle plague (1749) and a nutritional shortfall ( possibly resulting in a steep fall in female fertility rates) were factors involved. A mixture of charitable donations by individuals was sometimes supplemented by "informal" activities such as begging, farm work, gleaning and help from relatives. The official poor law administration (still operating under the Poor Relief Act 1601) tended to favour those who "deserved" help: widows, fatherless children, those who could no longer work because of incapacity. Apprenticeships for poor and/or illegitimate children was another method tried by poor law officials. Entitlement status as a resident of the parish was enforced under the Act to Relieve the Poor, or Settlement Act (1662). This "outdoor" system of poor relief in Penrith was supplemented by the supervisory "indoor" system of the workhouse – the one in Penrith opened in Albert Street (1737). (Note: Mullett (2019), pp.200-224)

Criminal activity was largely related to the agricultural nature of Penrith's economy – theft of livestock being prominent. (Note: Mullett (2019), pp.225-229)

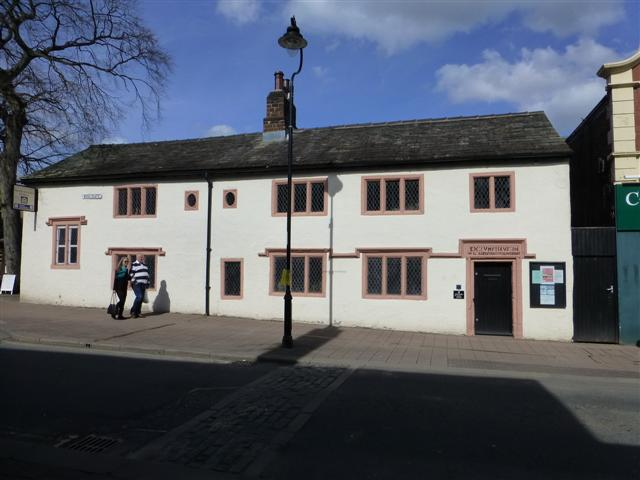
Penrith and Eden Museum, formerly Robinson's School. Inscribed lintel above doorway is dated 1670

The major educational institution in the town was the Queen Elizabeth Grammar School (founded 1564) which suffered from difficulties in funding itself and from a rather backward-looking classical humanistic curriculum. Lowther College (1697-1740) was founded by John Lowther, 1st Viscount Lonsdale, as an antidote to the classical Latin- and Greek-based system (John Locke was Lonsdale's mentor in this respect).The College sought to fit out the "sons of gentlemen" for business and trade purposes, along with an emphasis on Stoic morality. By an endowment (1661) of William Robinson, a wealthy London merchant, a school for girls in Middlegate was founded – teaching reading and "seamstry work". Its regulations featured an Anglican emphasis and had input from the local overseers of the poor. (Note: Mullett (2019), pp.232-249) According to local tradition, a "building in the churchyard, contiguous to and on the western side of Roger Bertram's old house" (the Tudor House) was occupied by the school run by Dame Birkett. Among her pupils in 1776/77 were William Wordsworth, his sister Dorothy and his future wife, Mary Hutchinson.

==== Victorian reform, refinement and democratisation (1800–1901) ====
During the 19th century, Penrith participated in the national "age of improvement", encapsulating advances in public health, welfare, transport and utilities provision, amenities, governmental administration and law and order. All this while remaining, essentially, a small market town of 3,801 people in 1801 rising to 9,182 in 1901. This despite increased connectivity (for example, a toll road to Appleby via Brougham instigated by local resident John Loudon McAdam and long-range stage coaching services). No extensive industrialisation took place – Penrith continued to rely on "agriculture, marketing, retailing, tourism and the hospitality industry". ("Agriculture" included the rearing of shorthorn beef cattle, for example). (Note: Mullett (2020), p.24) The Georgian textile industry in the town had died out by the 1820s, although there was some weaving linked to the firm of Peter Dixon of Carlisle. Metal manufacturing linked to agricultural tools (Stalker's in Castlegate) and to domestic goods (Altham's with a foundry in Albert Street), brewing, iron foundries, leather tanning and saw-mills rounded out the small-scale picture of Victorian Penrith's industries. (Note: Mullett (2020), pp.19-28, 31)

There was expansion of the town northwards during the 1850s and 1860s. Penrith Building Society purchased land going up towards the Beacon Hill. Houses built here became the New Streets area – Newlands Street, Arthur Street, Graham Street, Wordsworth Street and others. The Beacon itself, unwooded, became fully the property of William Lowther, 1st Earl of Lonsdale in 1811 (following enclosure of the commons as permitted under local enclosure Acts of Parliament – 43 Geo 3), and tree-planting began. To the south, expansion included the building of Tynefield House (belonging to the Rimington family who were living in the Mansion House). (Note: Mullett (2020), pp.29-40, 31)

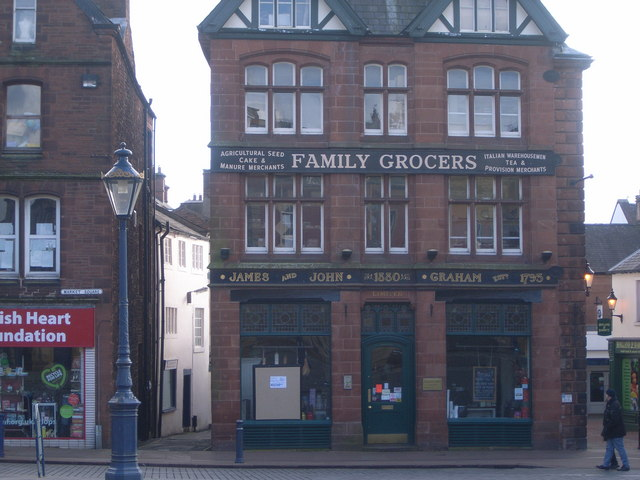
James and John Graham Family Grocers shop

The various agricultural and local produce markets (including "farmers' marts") were described at the time as "the principal support of the town". However, the coming of the railways led to some non-local goods being sold in places such as the market hall in Devonshire Street (opened 1860). Penrith had a varied list of trades and outlets to cater for the increasing middle-class – "grocer and tea dealer" J. and J. Graham, for example (established 1793, in current building since 1880). Glovers, hatters, glaziers, booksellers, printers, glass and china dealers, drapers, and photographers were just a selection of retailing in Penrith – all aided by press advertising in newspapers such as the Penrith Observer (1860-1968).

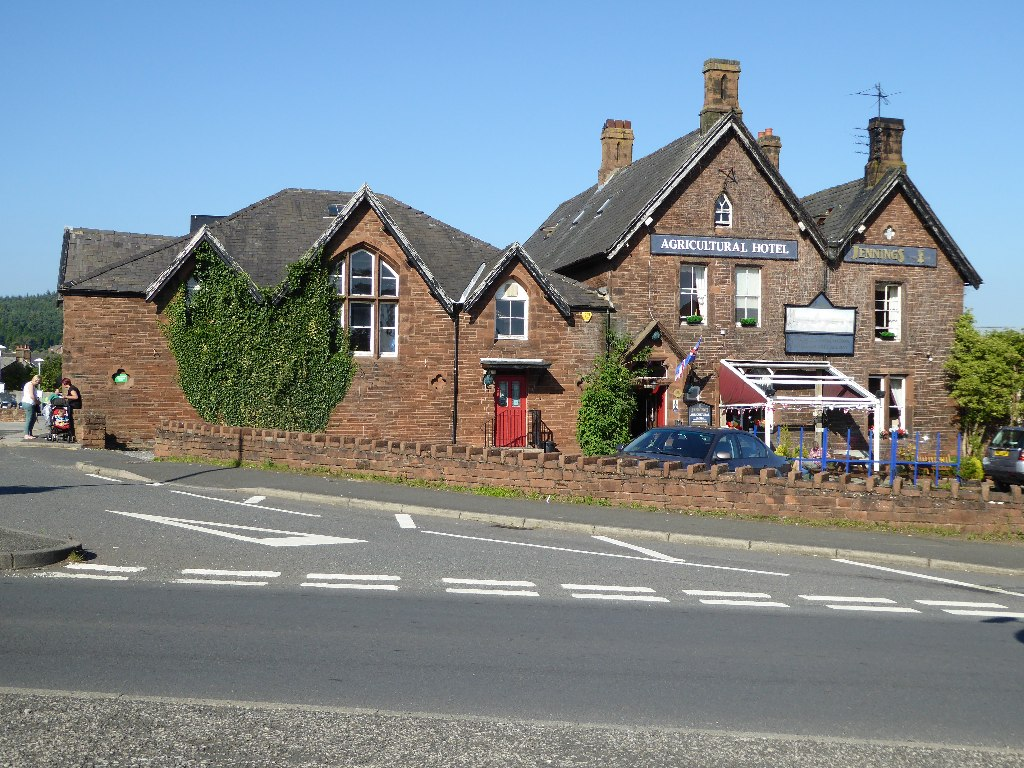
The Agricultural Hotel was also a posting house

The railways also helped to develop accommodation for visitors – the Agricultural Hotel and Station Hotel were built near to the railway, perhaps leading to a downturn in the fortunes of the George, an old stage-coach venue located centrally. Penrith had around 55 pubs and inns, some of which, such as the Grey Goat and the Woolpack, still exist. As well as providing food and drink, the pubs conducted much business - grains of various types were sold outside them in the Corn Market and Dockray areas. Rye was traded outside the Black Bull (now the Board and Elbow), for example. Much local employment (as servants or builders) as well as philanthropy (including funding education and church-building) still depended, though, on the local aristocratic element in society. Local benevolent and charitable societies, whose "ethos"...was "typically suffused with Christian idealism...", also played a large part in helping the more unfortunate. (Note: Mullett (2020), pp.46-65)

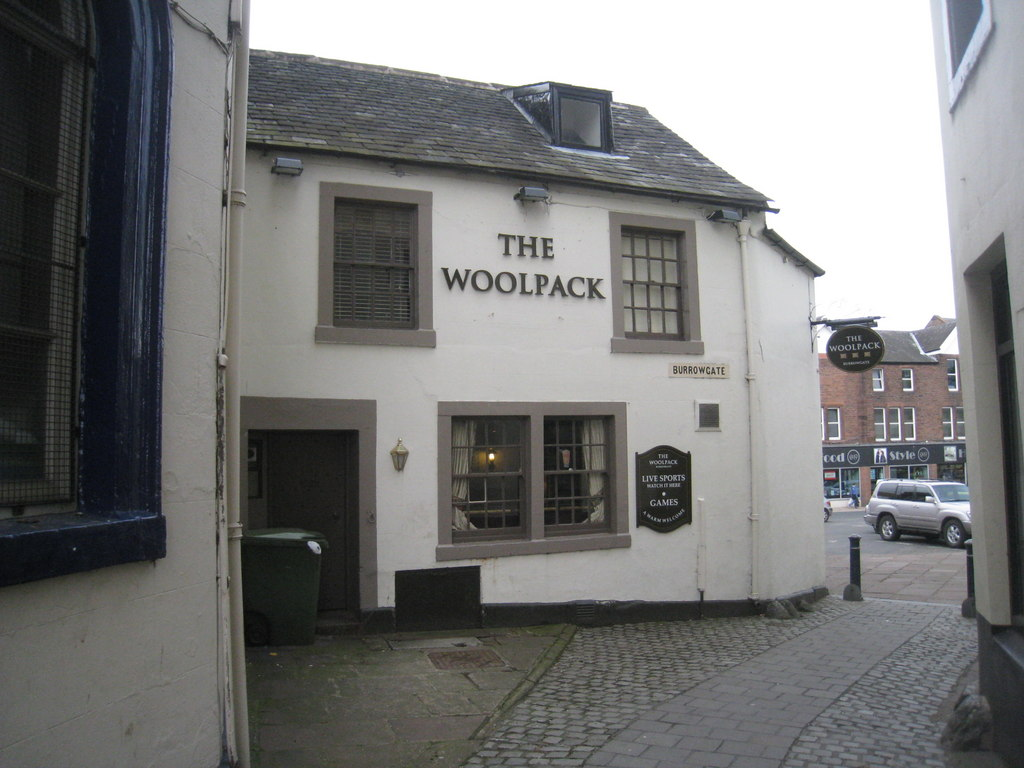
The Woolpack, Penrith

This devout nature of Penrithian people reflected that of the Victorian era generally and was evidenced in the large number of denominations and buildings devoted to them. As regards the established (Anglican) church, the Parish Rooms were opened (1894) in St. Andrew's Place on ground that used to house the cockpit; Christ Church, in Drovers Lane/ Stricklandgate, was opened in 1850 to alleviate pressure on St. Andrew's as a result of the growing population and had a more high church style – it was also made the focus of a separate parish. (Note: Mullett (2020), pp.66-102) Despite the lack of a populace involved with industry (a factor influential in the growth of Methodism), Penrith's Wesleyan Methodists grew in numbers – there were 865 members of the "Penrith Circuit" by 1871. A building at Sandgate Head was replaced by one in Wordsworth Street (opened 1873). The fewer Primitive Methodists took over the Sandgate building in 1873. (Note: Mullett (2020), pp.103-118) The Quakers seem to have suffered a bit of a downturn in their fortunes, but local members such as Thomas Altham, the ironmonger, contributed strongly to welfare reform in the town. (Note: Mullett (2020), pp.119-124) Congregationalists, in Penrith since c. 1817, attracted the well-educated and middle class persons, such as Samuel Plimsoll and his family.. Their Ebenezer Chapel (1824) in Duke Street was replaced by a church, also in Duke Street, in 1865. (Note: Mullett (2020), pp.125-133)

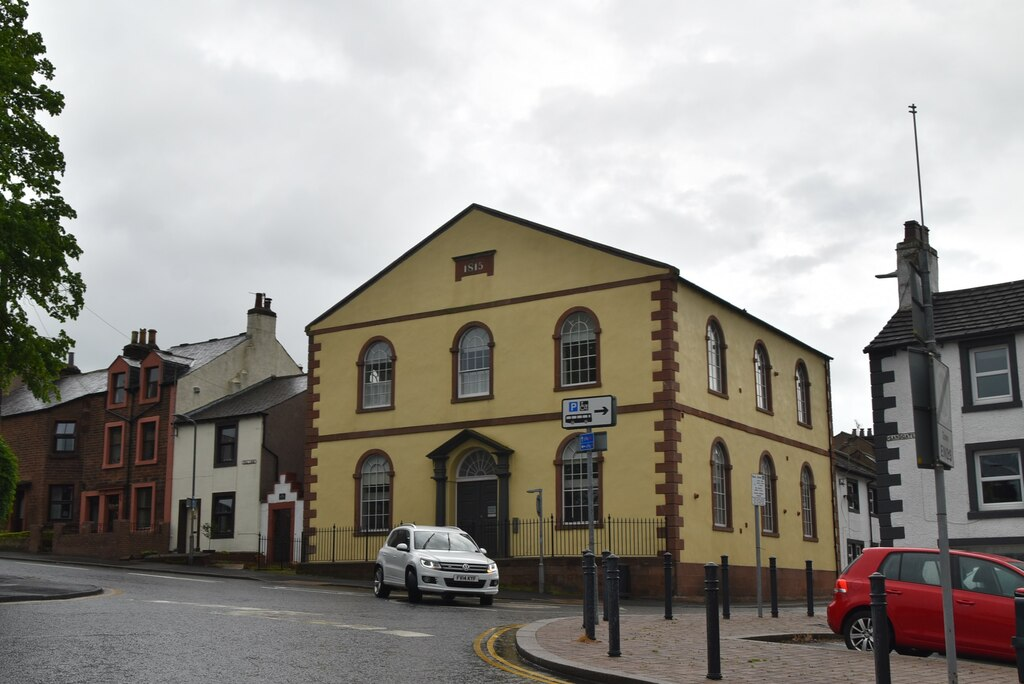
Former Methodist chapel (Wesleyan), built 1815, at Sandgate Head (Benson Row/Fell Lane); acquired by the Primitive Methodists 1873. Now converted to flats.

The Presbyterians also built a new, Gothic-style, church in Lowther Street (1884). Their Sunday attendance was c.60-100 worshipers. (Note: Mullett (2020), pp.134-137) The Salvation Army opened premises in Castlegate in 1882. This burned down and was replaced, in 1906, by a building in Hunter Lane, still operating. (Note: Mullett (2020), pp.138-140) The Christian Brethren established premises in Queen Street in 1873. (Note: Mullett (2020), p.141) Catholics, led from 1839 to 1849 by George Leo Haydock built St. Catherine's Church, Drovers Lane, which Haydock did not live to see (opened 1850). The influx of Catholics to the area, as a result of the Irish Famine and railway-building, led to tension (the "navvy riots") which Haydock was instrumental in placating. (Note: Mullett (2020), pp.142-150, 175-182)

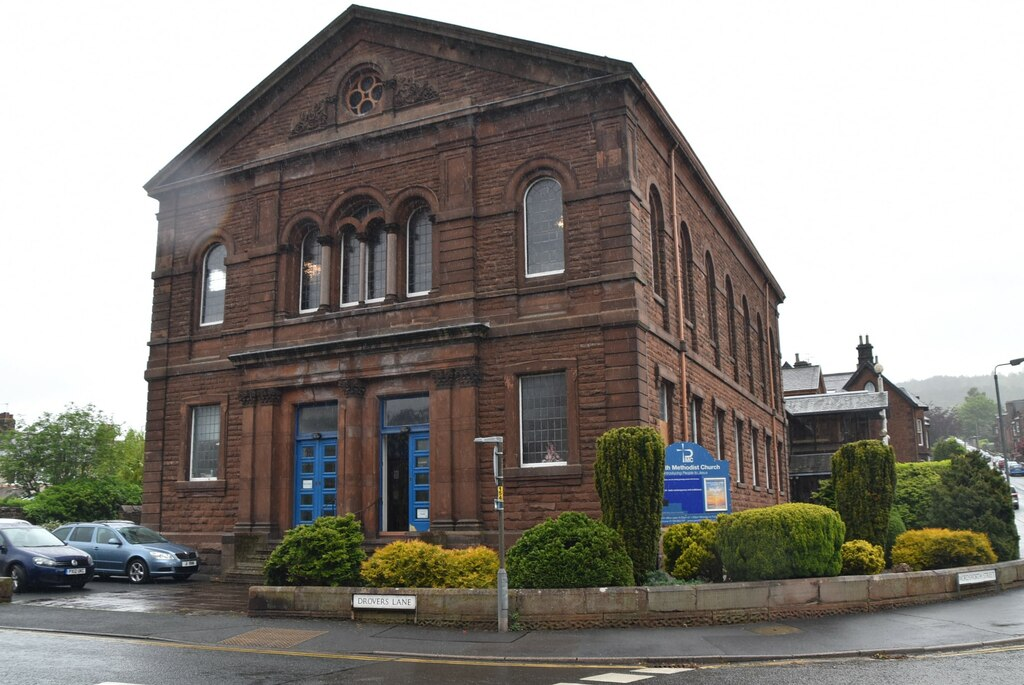
Methodist Church, Wordsworth Street. Opened 1873 to replace the Sandgate Head building.

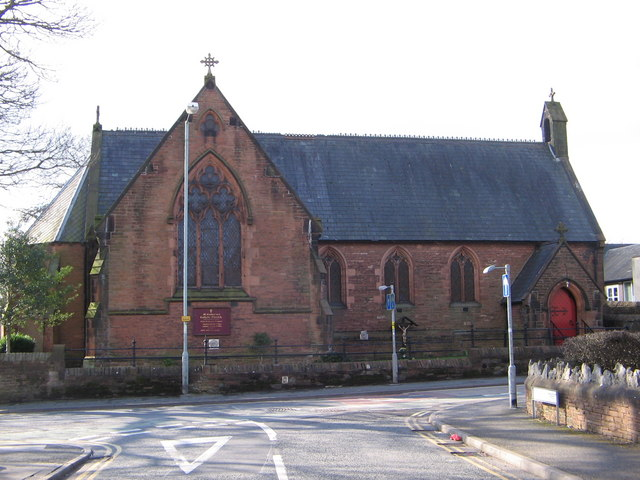
St. Catherine's Roman Catholic church in Drovers Lane.

The high level of literacy in Penrith during the 19th century was partially the result of church-organised education. The overall picture included: nine Sunday Schools; the Grammar School (fee-paying and with only 24 pupils in 1853); many private day and boarding schools; a Ragged school (Drovers Lane), closed 1874; a non-denominational Board school (1847 Castlegate Head, 1894 Brunswick Road); a National school (1816 Benson Row, 300 boys in the 1870s); Methodist school (Meeting House Lane – 327 pupils in the 1890s); the Catholic mixed primary school in Drovers Lane; Robinson's School in Middlegate which moved to Nether End, Graham Street and became the Girls National School (263 pupils in the 1890s). (Note: Mullett (2020), pp.201-214)

Churches were also involved in the provision of charitable payments to the poor : such funds and endowments were administered by churchwardens and vestries (and JPs), for example. These funds were small compared to the rateable funds administered by the overseers of the poor on an "outdoor" and "indoor" (workhouse) basis. The system changed with the Poor Law Amendment Act 1834 by which all relief to the able-bodied poor was made illegal unless work was done in "well-regulated workhouses". This new arrangement was run by the central government-appointed Poor Law Commission, (then by the Poor Law Board from 1847, then by the Local Government Board from 1871). Penrith became the lead in a local Poor Law union in 1836, supervised by a 50-strong Board of guardians. The existing workhouse in Albert Street was closed and, in 1839, a larger one (built for c.250 inmates) was opened near Castletown Bridge on the Greystoke Road. (Note: Mullett (2020), pp.333-348)

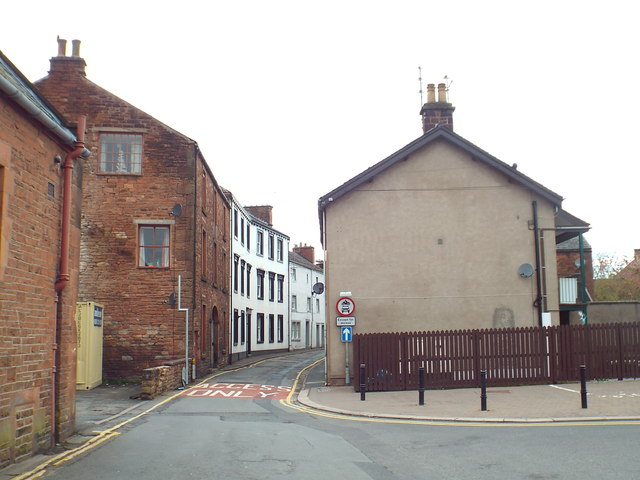
Albert Street, Penrith. Formerly known as Work House Lane. The white-coloured building to the left was the old workhouse (housing c.60 inmates, now converted to flats).

The supply of utilities, such as gas and water, pitched the urban supporters of "progress" against the more north-town (Town Head) and rural, farming, "economy"-minded members of Penrith society. A private gasworks had been set up in Old London Road in 1833. Attempts to turn this into a public, rateable enterprise struggled until the advent of the railways (and the prospect of tourists, visitors, holiday-makers having to deal with unreliable lighting). By 1845, local voting swung towards payment via rates. In 1878 the Local Board of Health (established 1851) took over the gas works from the private owner. (Note: Mullett (2020), pp.155-161)

The coming of the railway to Penrith was a catalyst for change. Despite objections to the railways, supposedly spoiling the beauty and tranquility of the Lakes, according to William Wordsworth, John Ruskin and Lord Brougham, and despite local people predicting the end of inns and of posting, the local nobility succeeded in their promotion of a project to build a line from Lancaster to Carlisle. This line would be via Shap, Kendal and Penrith, rather than an alternative one that would run across Morecambe Bay and along the west Cumbrian coast. Work began in 1844 and the line was opened in December 1846, despite being interrupted by the "navvy riots" of early 1846 when serious violence broke out between Scots/English navvies on one side and Irish navvies on the other. An east-west route, carrying coal and iron ore from west Cumbria to and from Durham and visitors to Keswick was the next proposal. The Cockermouth, Keswick and Penrith Railway opened for business in 1864 (for goods) and 1865 (for passengers). Penrith's ancient role as a communications hub was therefore re-enforced. (Note: Mullett (2020), pp.162-189) The development of the Eden Valley Railway between Clifton and Kirkby Stephen, opened in 1862, allowed easier access, for both minerals and passengers, between the North-East and the Penrith area.

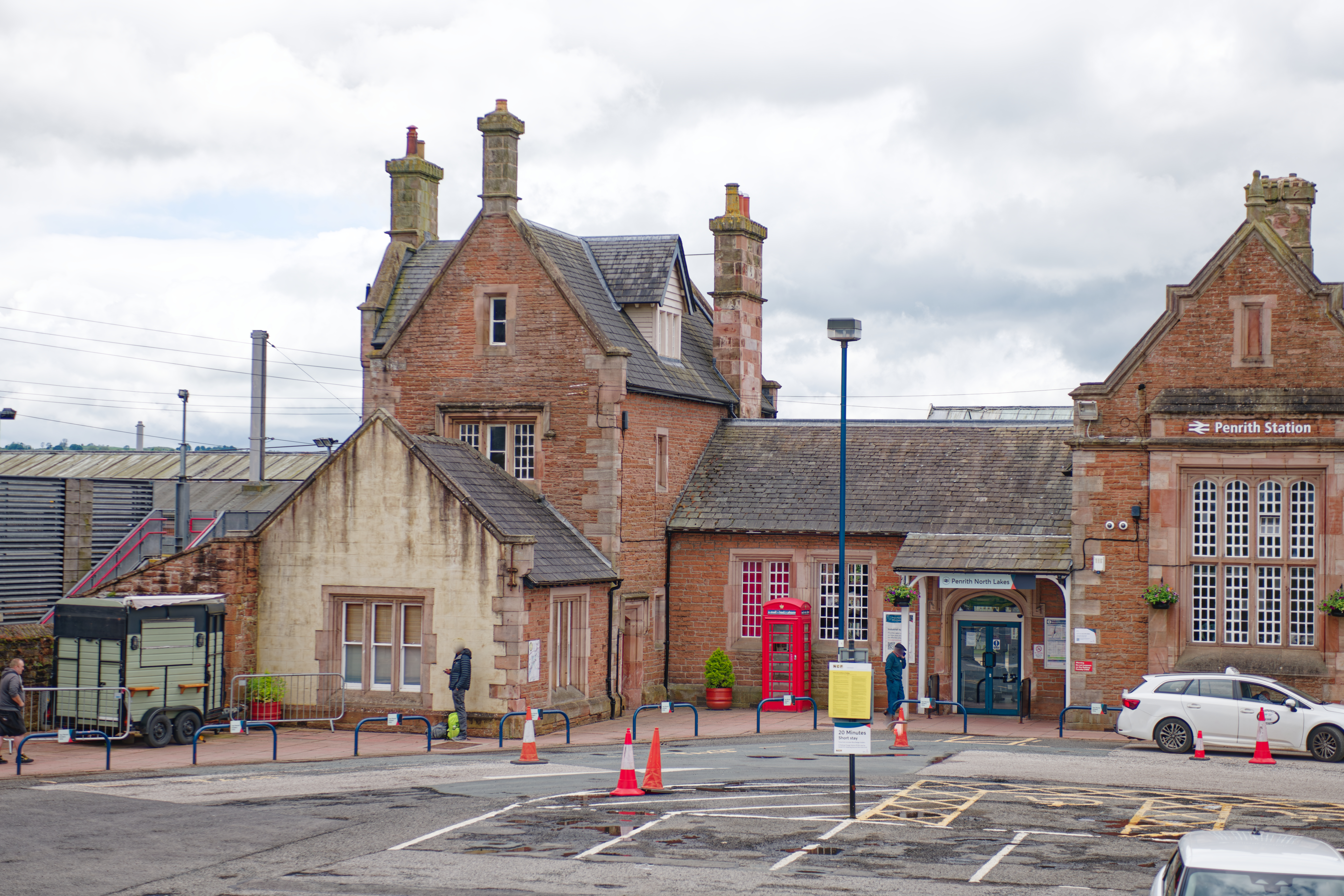
Penrith Railway Station (built 1846) from the west

In national politics, the Reform Act 1832 resulted in the creation of the Cumberland East division (with two-members), consisting of Cumberland, Eskdale and Leath wards – Penrith was in the last of these. Aristocratic dominance still prevailed, with Whigs (later the Liberal Party) and Conservatives vying for the support of around 5,000-6,000 voters. (Note: Mullett (2020), pp.220-239)

The landed gentry still dominated local government in early 19th century Penrith – via systems such as manorial courts, the select vestry and JPs. However, the establishment of the local Board of Health (1851), which was concerned about the threats posed by cholera, typhus, smallpox and diphtheria, enabled some improvement. The town's water supply and sewage treatment, still relying largely on Thacka Beck and prone to contamination, was upgraded, using water from the River Eamont (against some local opposition who did not want a rise in the rates). The provision of a cemetery on the west side of Beacon Hill improved the sanitary situation in Penrith, as did the setting up of small isolation and fever hospitals on land purchased from the Devonshire estate at Fair Hill. In 1892, the Board became an Urban District Council. (Note: Mullett (2020), pp.240-266)

Although there was a lack of "acute social conflict" in Penrith, (Note: Mullett (2020), p.349) the town did suffer from occasional severe crime perpetrated by highway-robbers and burglars, especially in the early years of the century during the Post-Napoleonic Depression. The large number of pubs in Penrith also contributed to spasmodic disturbances. A "house of detention" (prison) had been set up in early-modern times, along with a constable, in Fell Lane and in Scotland Road (1825) and lastly in Hunter Lane (1860). In 1858, a "principal station" of the county constabulary was established in Hunter Lane as well. A notable exception to the relatively low level of crime was the murder of PC Byrnes at Plumpton. (Note: Mullett (2020), pp.313-332)

The later 19th century saw a flourishing of social life in Penrith, with new buildings to accommodate it: the Agricultural Hall (1870) in Castlegate; the Drill Hall and Concert Hall (1893) in Portland Place; the Exchange Hall in Angel Lane being examples. A number of voluntary associations – for example, the Penrith Agricultural Society (1830); the Penrith Farmers' Club (1845); the Literary and Scientific Society (1881) were founded. There were many charitable and friendly societies operating. Over 80 pubs, a few breweries and various temperance societies catered for a range of tastes. Association football was established in South End; rugby in the 1870s (with the team joining the Union in 1885); cricket was established in the 1830s with the United Beacon team being founded in 1866. Penrith Swimming Club was formed in 1881 and was based at the River Eamont at Frenchfield. Horse -racing (along with hunting) had taken place in the commons area near the Beacon since the 18th Century. The enclosure of the ground in 1803 provided the opportunity for the growing middle-class of Penrith, allied with the local gentry, to purchase land (now occupied by Penrith Golf Club) from the enclosure commissioners in 1807 and build a formal racecourse with segregated stands (1814) and a wall (1811) (to keep out socially undesirable people). The final race was in 1896. Cumberland and Westmorland wrestling took place during the race meets. (Note: Mullett (2020), pp.298-312)

== Governance ==
There are two tiers of local government covering Penrith, at parish (town) and unitary authority level: Penrith Town Council and Westmorland and Furness Council. The town council is based at Church House on Friargate. Westmorland and Furness Council also has an office in the town, at Voreda House on Portland Place, which achieved the Passive house standard for energy efficiency in 2024.

For national elections, Penrith forms part of the Penrith and Solway constituency, which has been represented by Markus Campbell-Savours of the Labour Party since the 2024 general election.

=== Administrative history ===
Penrith was an ancient parish, which formed part of the historic county of Cumberland from the county's creation in the 12th century. The parish was made a local board district in 1851. Such districts were reconstituted as urban districts under the Local Government Act 1894. In Penrith, the Urban District Council (UDC) carried on the reforming agenda of the Board of Health, and its remit included water and gas supply, oversight of the isolation hospital, the Fire Brigade, ambulances, council housing, parks and public spaces, local highways, education, environmental health, rating and finance.

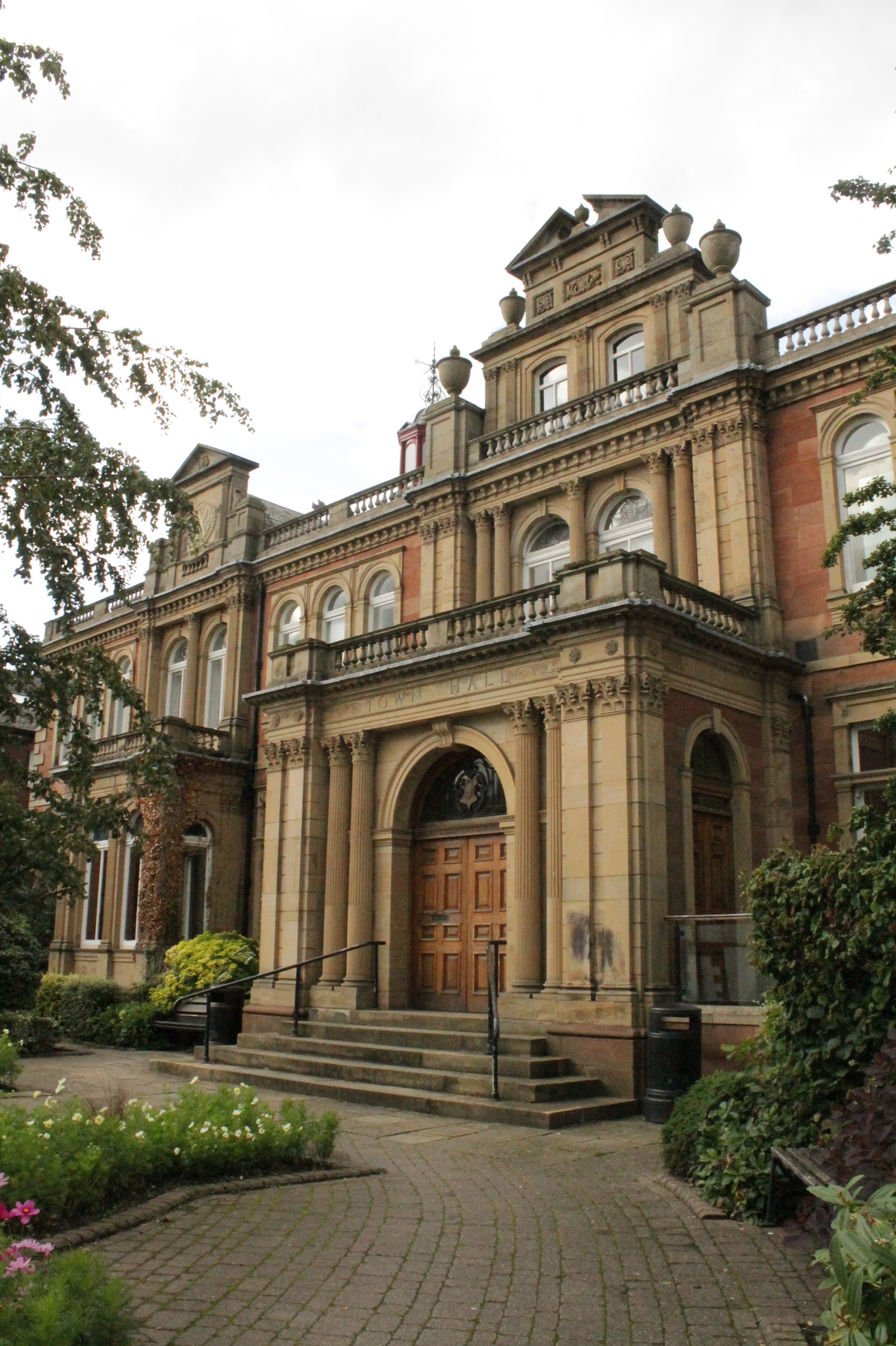
Penrith Town Hall

In 1904, the urban district council bought a pair of large semi-detached houses at the corner of Corney Square and Portland Place, which had been built in 1791. John Wordsworth, a cousin of the poet William (not to be confused with his brother John, the captain of the Earl of Abergavenny) had lived in one of them. They were converted (controversially) into Penrith Town Hall, which opened in 1906. Until 1992, the public library was also housed here as was the town's museum before the latter moved (in 1985) to the former Robinson's School.

In the 1920s, Penrith Castle came into council possession, its grounds becoming a public park. Castle Hill (Tyne Close) Housing Estate was built nearby. Further council housing was built at Fair Hill and Castletown before the Second World War, and after the war at Scaws, Townhead and Pategill. The district was bordered on three sides by Penrith Rural District, the southern boundary marked by the River Eamont being with Westmorland.

Penrith Urban District was abolished in 1974. The area became part of Eden District in the new county of Cumbria. No successor parish was created for the former urban district at the time of the 1974 reforms, and so it became an unparished area. It was therefore directly administered by Eden District Council, which based itself in the town, at both the old urban district council's headquarters at the Town Hall and the old rural district council's offices at Mansion House on Bishop Yards. A new civil parish of Penrith was subsequently established in 2015, with its parish council taking the name Penrith Town Council.

Eden was abolished in 2023 when the new Westmorland and Furness Council was created, also taking over the functions of the abolished Cumbria County Council in the area. There were some protests at Penrith's inclusion in Westmorland and Furness rather than the new Cumberland unitary authority, on the basis that the town was historically part of the county of Cumberland rather than Westmorland. The Town Hall and Mansion House passed to the new Westmorland and Furness Council, and closed in 2024 when Voreda House opened.

== Geography ==
=== Watercourses ===
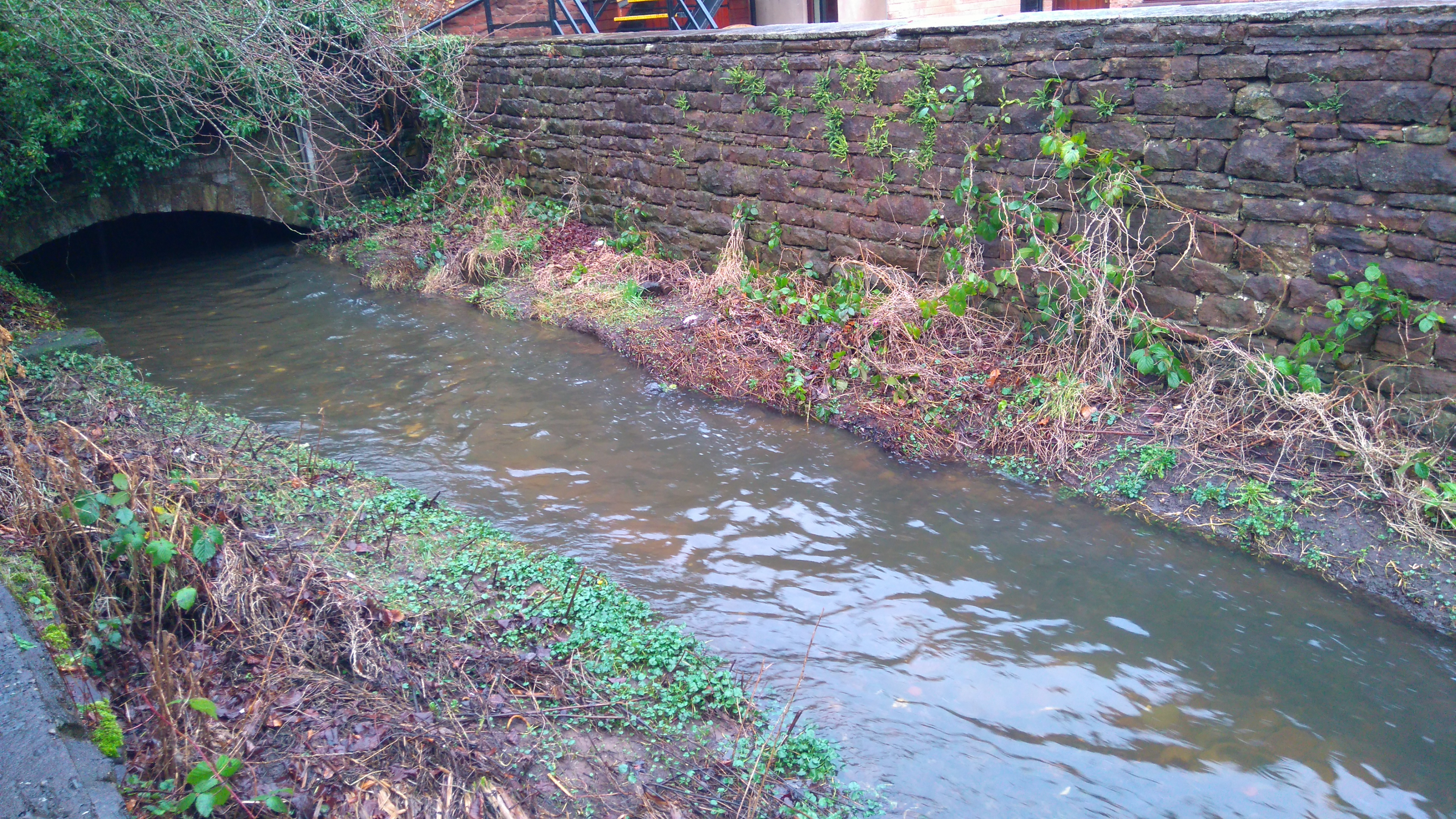
Thacka Beck emerging from its culvert behind the Tourist information centre (in the Penrith and Eden Museum)

Penrith lies in the Eden Valley, just north of the River Eamont. Other local rivers bounding the town are the Lowther and Petteril. Thacka Beck flows through the town centre partly in a culvert, remaining mostly underground. It links the River Petteril and the River Eamont. For many centuries, the Beck provided Penrith's main water supply. Thacka Beck Nature Reserve provides flood storage to protect buildings in Penrith. Another stream, the Myers or Dog Beck, flows through and under the south-west of the town, joining Thacka Beck near Tynefield Court. The Dog Beck section has also been known as Scumscaw Beck or Tyne Syke. In 2014 the pub chain Wetherspoons opened a branch in Penrith, naming it the Dog Beck. There are also streams or becks running through the Carleton area of the town.

=== Divisions and suburbs ===
==== Castletown ====
Castletown, west of the West Coast Main Line, includes the Gilwilly Industrial Estate and some of the Penrith or Myers Industrial Estate. The area, originally built for workers on the railway line, mostly consists of late 19th and early 20th-century terraced housing, including some council housing. (Note: Mullett (2020), pp.37, 174, 262) Since the 1990s, private developments such as Greystoke Park, Castletown Drive and Castle Park have appeared.

There was until March 2010 a pub in the suburb, The Castle Inn, and in previous years a sub-post office, a Co-op store and other shops, all now closed. Until the 1970s, Castletown had its Church of England St Saviour's in Brougham Street, acting as a chapel of ease to Penrith's parish church of St Andrew, originally built as a Primitive Methodist chapel. As of 2017, the Oasis Evangelical Church holds services at Brackenber Court sheltered housing complex in Musgrave Street. The Church in the Barn, Elim Pentecostal church, meets at the community centre at Gilwilly.

The suburb has a community centre on the recreation ground at Gilwilly and until recently held an annual gala day and parade throughout Penrith. At one time in the mid-20th century elections were held amongst regulars at the Castle pub to find a Mayor of Castletown. There is longstanding rivalry between the Castletown and Townhead districts.

==== Townhead ====
Townhead is the town's northern area, including the Fair Hill district and the Voreda Park or Anchor housing estate. It mainly flanks the A6 road, heading uphill towards Carlisle. The road is named Stricklandgate and Scotland Road, but on maps before the mid-19th century it appears as Town Head. It was one of seven constablewicks into which the ancient Penrith parish divided, alongside Middlegate, Burrowgate, Dockray and Netherend in the town proper and Plumpton Head and Carleton beyond.

==== New Streets ====
New Streets marks an area between Townhead and Scaws on the side of the Beacon Hill or Fell, with steep streets of some terraced housing, but mainly detached and semi-detached houses of the 1850s and 1860s developed by the Penrith Building Society. These streets from north to south are Graham, Wordsworth, Lowther and Arthur Street. (Note: Mullett (2020), p.37) The term sometimes includes Fell Lane, (which is actually the ancient east road from Penrith town centre to Langwathby), and Croft Avenue and Croft Terrace (from about 1930), which were not developed till later. At the foot is Drovers Lane, once Back Lane, subdivided into Drovers Terrace, Wordsworth Terrace, Lowther Terrace, Bath Terrace, Arthur Terrace, Lonsdale Terrace, and finally Meeting House Lane. Along the top is Beacon Edge, with extensive views over the town and towards the Lake District. Until the turn of the 20th century, Beacon Edge was known as Beacon Road. Apart from the streets up the fellside there are some that link smaller housing developments between them.

The fellside is known to have been used as a burial ground for victims of bubonic plague, which struck Penrith down the centuries. There are also areas that still have farming names, such as a wooded enclosure in Fell Lane known as the Pinfold (or Pinny) – once a pound for stray animals until owners paid to reclaim them. One lane off Beacon Edge is still Intack Lane, i. e. the lane to farmed land. Most of what formed the intack was passed to Penrith Cemetery.

==== Scaws ====
The Scaws Estate was built, in the Garden Suburb style, by Penrith Urban District Council after World War II on land hitherto known as the Flatt Field and Scaws Farm, as part of the Lowther Estates. By 1953, the high(er)-quality nature of the buildings could not be sustained financially, and more utilitarian construction on the estate took place. (Note: Mullett (2022), pp.228-248) Scaws Farm is now Coldsprings Farm. Later some private housing was built on higher parts of the estate.

Beaconside Primary School stands in the centre of the estate, where there were once three corner shops and a launderette. Adjoining Scaws are the private Barcohill and Meadow Croft housing estates.

==== Carleton ====
Carleton was once a separate settlement of houses along one side of the A686 road following the boundary of the built-up area. The housing stock underwent much expansion in the late 20th and early 21st centuries.

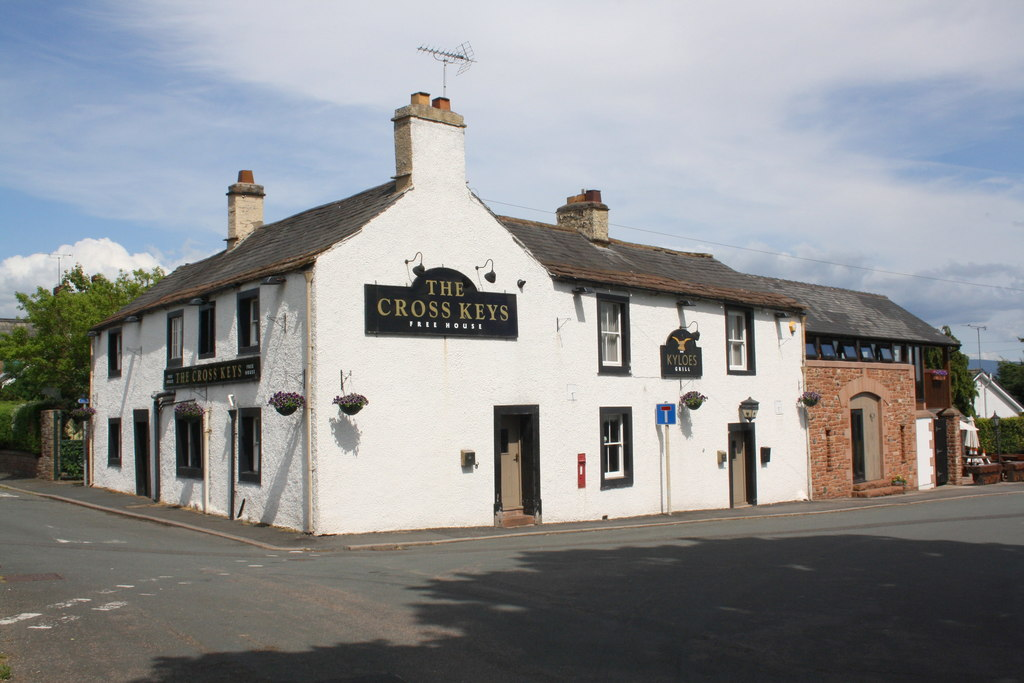
The Cross Keys Inn, Carleton

Carleton Hall holds the headquarters of the Cumbria Constabulary. The area is the home of Carelton Banks FC, colloquially the Pinks.

==== Pategill ====
Adjoining Carleton is the Pategill Housing Estate. It began as a council estate on land once part of the Carleton Hall estate and is still mostly owned by housing associations. (Note: Mullett (2022), pp.251-252) Two streets, Prince Charles Close and Jubilee Close, were opened by the Prince of Wales in 1977. The centre of the estate is accessible by foot only and there was until 2012 a small convenience store. Several properties are run as sheltered housing for the elderly.

==== Wetheriggs ====
The Wetheriggs, Skirsgill and Castle Hill or Tyne Close areas were developed in the 1920s by Penrith Urban District Council on land formerly known as Scumscaw. The first private housing was developed in Holme Riggs Avenue and Skirsgill Gardens just before World War II. Further development did not start until the 1960s and 1970s, on land between Wetheriggs Lane and Ullswater Road. Not until the late 1980s were the two roads connected by the Clifford Road extension, which saw the Skirsgill area developed. There are three schools: Ullswater Community College. North Lakes Junior and Queen Elizabeth Grammar School (QEGS). The Crescent in Clifford Road holds sheltered accommodation for the elderly. There was once a shop at the junction of Huntley Avenue and Clifford Road and another at the foot of Holme Riggs Avenue. The large North Lakes Hotel and Spa stands at the junction of Clifford and Ullswater Roads, overlooking the Skirsgill Junction 40 Interchange of the M6 motorway, A66 and A592 roads.

==== Penrith New Squares ====
Plans to expand Penrith town centre south into the Southend Road area began by expanding the swimming pool area into a leisure centre, to replace a previous car park and sports fields, including ones used by Penrith and Penrith United football clubs. Plans for the rest of the scheme were drawn up by a property firm and included a supermarket and shopping streets, car parking and housing. Penrith New Squares refers to shops to be centred round two squares for parking and public entertainment.

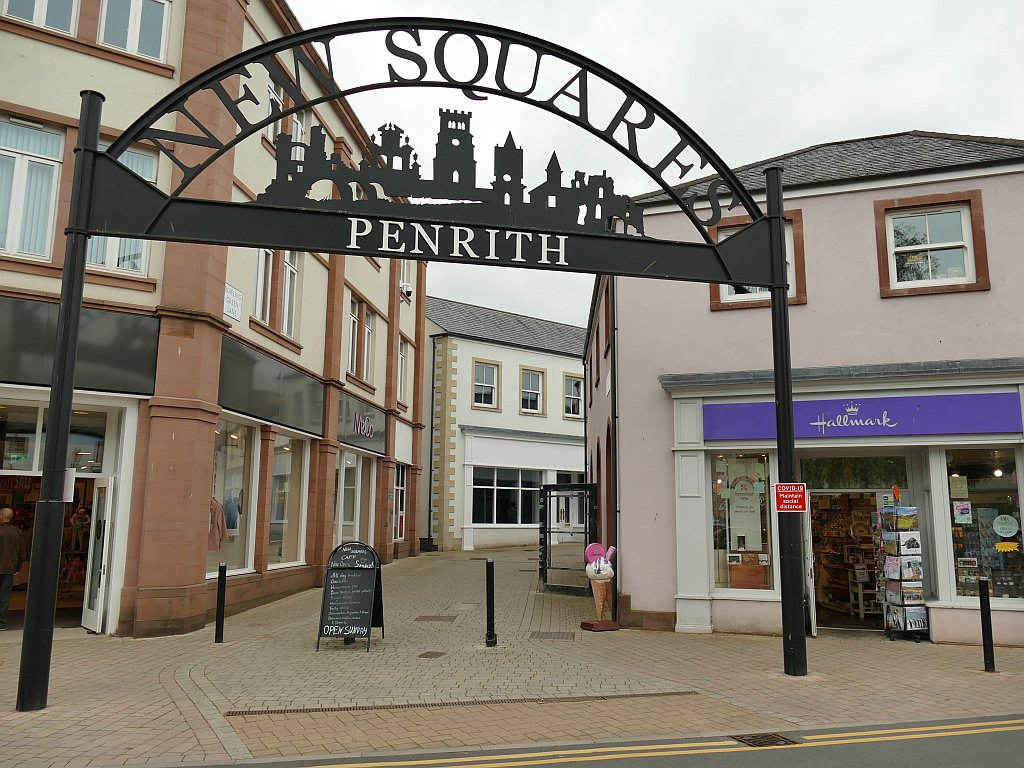
Entrance to New Squares, Penrith

Work here was suspended in October 2008 due to the financial crisis, but a new deal was agreed with Sainsbury's and it resumed in 2011. The update includes less new housing, with parts deferred for up to five years. Sainsbury's opened in December 2011. In June 2013, the first shop in the squares opened, along with a walk through from Sainsbury's to the town centre.

=== Climate ===
Like most of the British Isles, Penrith has a maritime climate with mild summers and winters. The nearest Met Office weather station is at Newton Rigg, about a mile outside of the centre. Temperatures have ranged from 33.3 °C (91.9 °F) in July 1901, down to −20.0 °C (−4.0 °F) in February 1969, although the lowest in recent years was −17.7 °C (0.1 °F) in December 2010. Newton Rigg also holds a record for the coldest April temperature reported in England: −15.0 °C (5.0 °F) in April 1917.

Climate data for Newton Rigg, elevation: 169 m (554 ft), 1991–2020 normals, extremes 1906–2021, sun and precipitation days 1981-2010
Month	Jan	Feb	Mar	Apr	May	Jun	Jul	Aug	Sep	Oct	Nov	Dec	Year
Record high °C (°F)	13.9 (57.0)	18.1 (64.6)	21.7 (71.1)	24.6 (76.3)	27.2 (81.0)	30.0 (86.0)	30.1 (86.2)	31.1 (88.0)	29.6 (85.3)	25.2 (77.4)	17.8 (64.0)	15.6 (60.1)	31.1 (88.0)
Mean daily maximum °C (°F)	6.4 (43.5)	7.0 (44.6)	9.1 (48.4)	12.0 (53.6)	15.3 (59.5)	17.6 (63.7)	19.5 (67.1)	18.9 (66.0)	16.6 (61.9)	12.8 (55.0)	9.1 (48.4)	6.8 (44.2)	12.6 (54.7)
Daily mean °C (°F)	3.7 (38.7)	4.0 (39.2)	5.5 (41.9)	7.7 (45.9)	10.5 (50.9)	13.2 (55.8)	15.1 (59.2)	14.6 (58.3)	12.4 (54.3)	9.3 (48.7)	6.0 (42.8)	3.8 (38.8)	8.8 (47.9)
Mean daily minimum °C (°F)	0.9 (33.6)	0.9 (33.6)	1.9 (35.4)	3.3 (37.9)	5.7 (42.3)	8.7 (47.7)	10.6 (51.1)	10.3 (50.5)	8.2 (46.8)	5.7 (42.3)	2.9 (37.2)	0.7 (33.3)	5.0 (41.0)
Record low °C (°F)	−17.8 (0.0)	−20.0 (−4.0)	−15.0 (5.0)	−15.0 (5.0)	−5.0 (23.0)	−0.6 (30.9)	1.7 (35.1)	−1.1 (30.0)	−2.8 (27.0)	−6.7 (19.9)	−12.6 (9.3)	−17.7 (0.1)	−20.0 (−4.0)
Average precipitation mm (inches)	103.1 (4.06)	81.1 (3.19)	69.4 (2.73)	52.0 (2.05)	55.5 (2.19)	66.5 (2.62)	74.7 (2.94)	80.5 (3.17)	75.6 (2.98)	102.4 (4.03)	102.8 (4.05)	117.7 (4.63)	981.3 (38.64)
Average precipitation days (≥ 1.0 mm)	15.1	11.2	13.1	10.8	10.6	10.4	11.1	11.5	11.6	15.3	15.3	14.4	150.4
Mean monthly sunshine hours	38.8	59.0	97.0	135.4	166.9	161.7	160.1	145.5	114.6	79.4	41.7	37.2	1,237.3
Source 1: Met Office
Source 2: Starlings Roost Weather Starlings Roost Weather

== Demography ==
The population in 1841 was 6,145. At the 2021 census the parish had a population of 16,987, and the built-up area had a population of 16,700. The built-up area population was 15,181 at the 2011 census.

== Landmarks ==
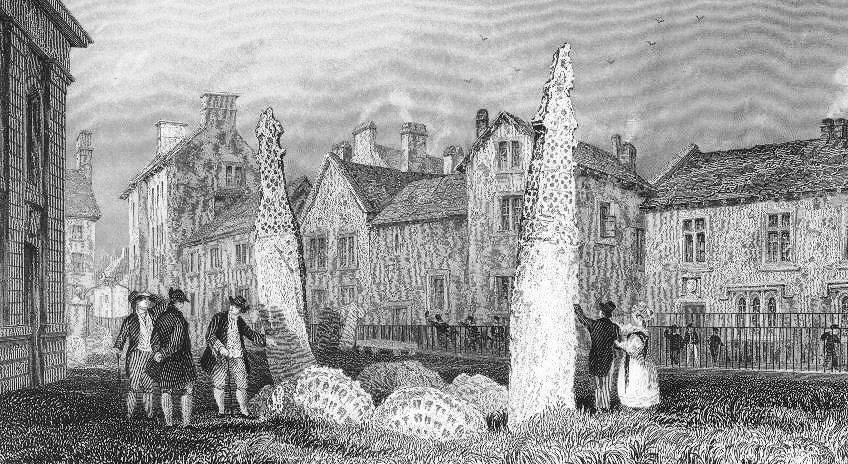
The Giant's Grave in 1835.

The main church is St Andrew's, built in 1720–1722 in an imposing Grecian style, abutting a 12th/13th-century tower. The churchyard has ancient crosses and hogback tombstones known as the Giant's Grave (early 10th century) and Giant's Thumb (remains of a Norse cross from about 920).

Ruins of Penrith Castle (14th–16th centuries) can be seen from the adjacent railway station. It is run by English Heritage. To the south-east of the town are more substantial ruins of Brougham Castle, also held by English Heritage, as are the ancient henge sites known as Mayburgh Henge and King Arthur's Round Table to the south.

Penrith's main war memorial, to both World Wars, is the lychgate at the entrance to Castle Park, opposite the railway station. It has the names of 201 Penrithians who died in both wars inscribed on bronze plates inside the gate.

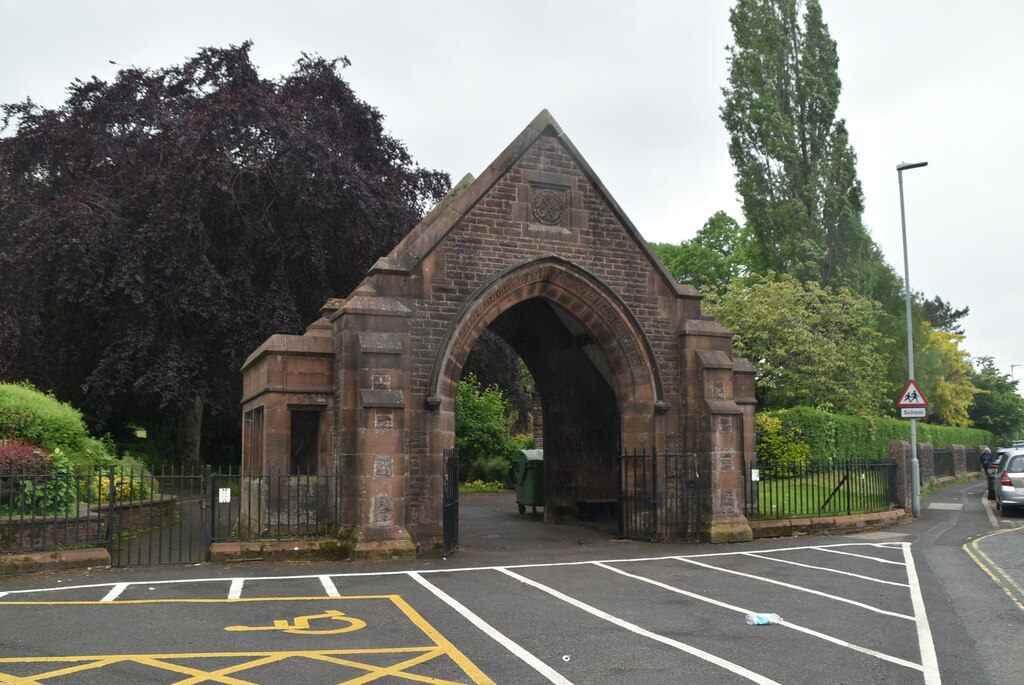
War memorial gate, Castle Park

The town centre (Market Square) has a Clock Tower, the "Musgrave Monument", erected in 1861, to mark the premature death of Philip Musgrave of Edenhall, who died in Madrid in 1859. It stands where the Market Cross used to be, the latter being removed in 1807. A new market cross was built in Great Dockray in 1983 and serves as a bandstand.

Hutton Hall in Friargate has a 14th-century pele tower at the rear, attached to an 18th-century building.

Dockray Hall (once the Gloucester Arms) dates from about 1470 and may include remains of another pele tower. Tradition has it that Richard, Duke of Gloucester resided there before becoming King Richard III and carried out extensive work at Penrith Castle about 1471.

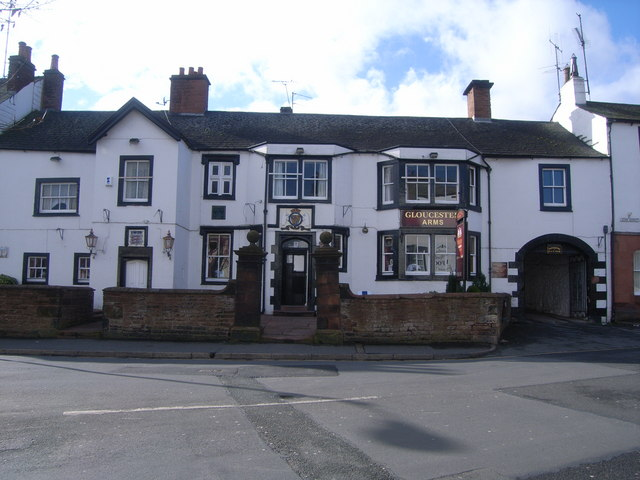
Dockray Hall. Built c. 1470, modified c. 1580 by the de Whelpdale family when it became a coaching inn. Was the Gloucester Arms for many years. Now an independent pub using the original name

Penrith has several "yards" and narrow alleyways. These may have had defensive benefits in times when raids by the Scots were made. Many towns have these yards – Kendal has around 150 – and Brunskill suggests their origin lay in town development in later centuries, rather than in the 14th century.

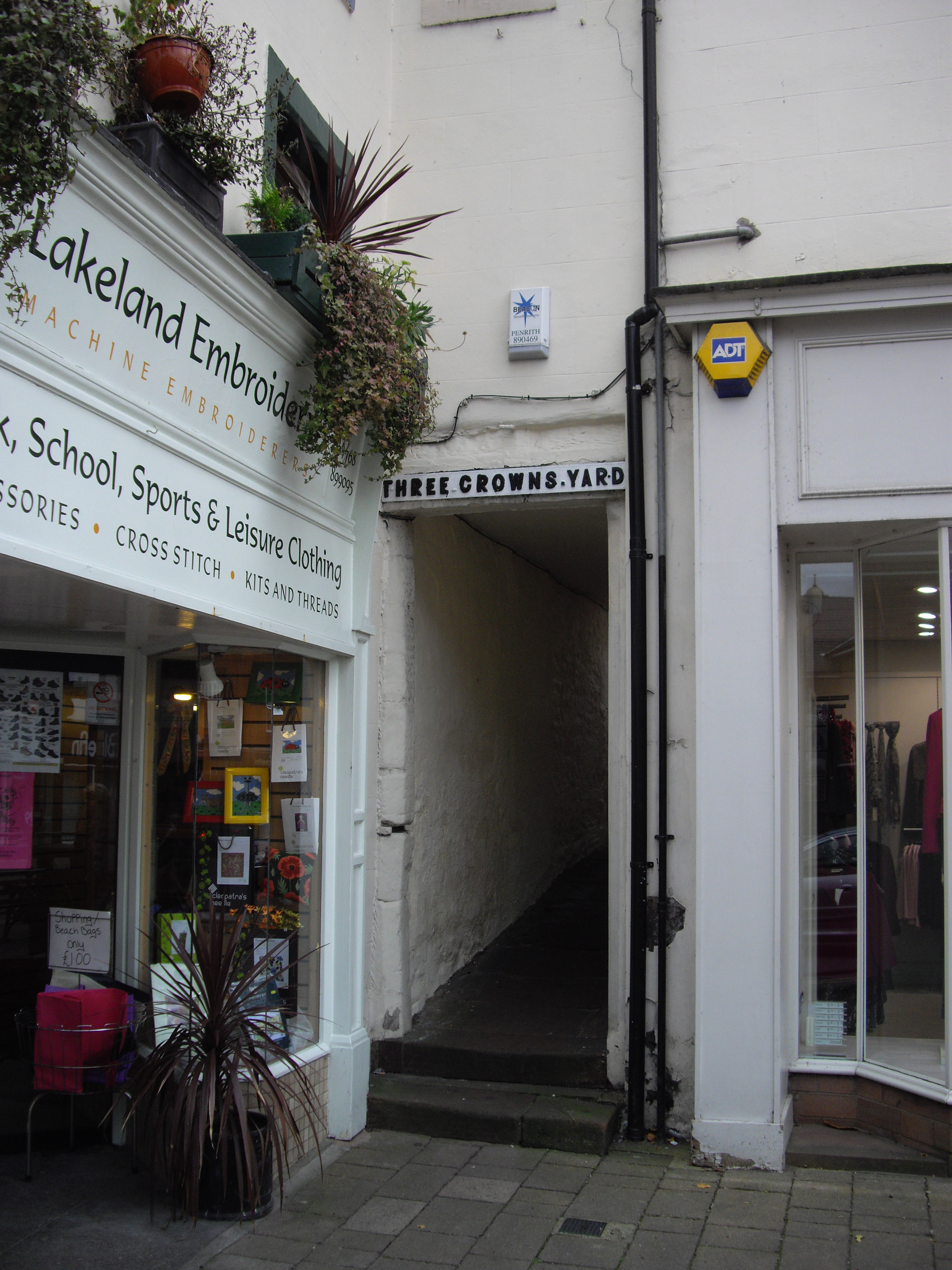
Entrance to Three Crowns Yard

Just north of the town is a wooded signal-beacon hill named Beacon Hill, originally Penrith Fell. Its last use was probably in 1804 in the war against Napoleon. Traditionally, Beacon Pike warned of danger from Scotland. Though ringed by commercial woodland appropriated by Lowther Estates, it still has natural woodlands that used to be visited by locals and tourists. Vandalism led Lowther Estates to deny further access to the woods via informal entry points as of 2025. On a clear day most of Eden Valley, local fells, Pennines and parts of the North Lakes can be seen. Beacon Hill possibly gave Penrith its Celtic name of "red hill".

A fibreglass 5.50 m (18 ft)-tall statue of King Kong once stood in the Skirsgill Auction Mart.

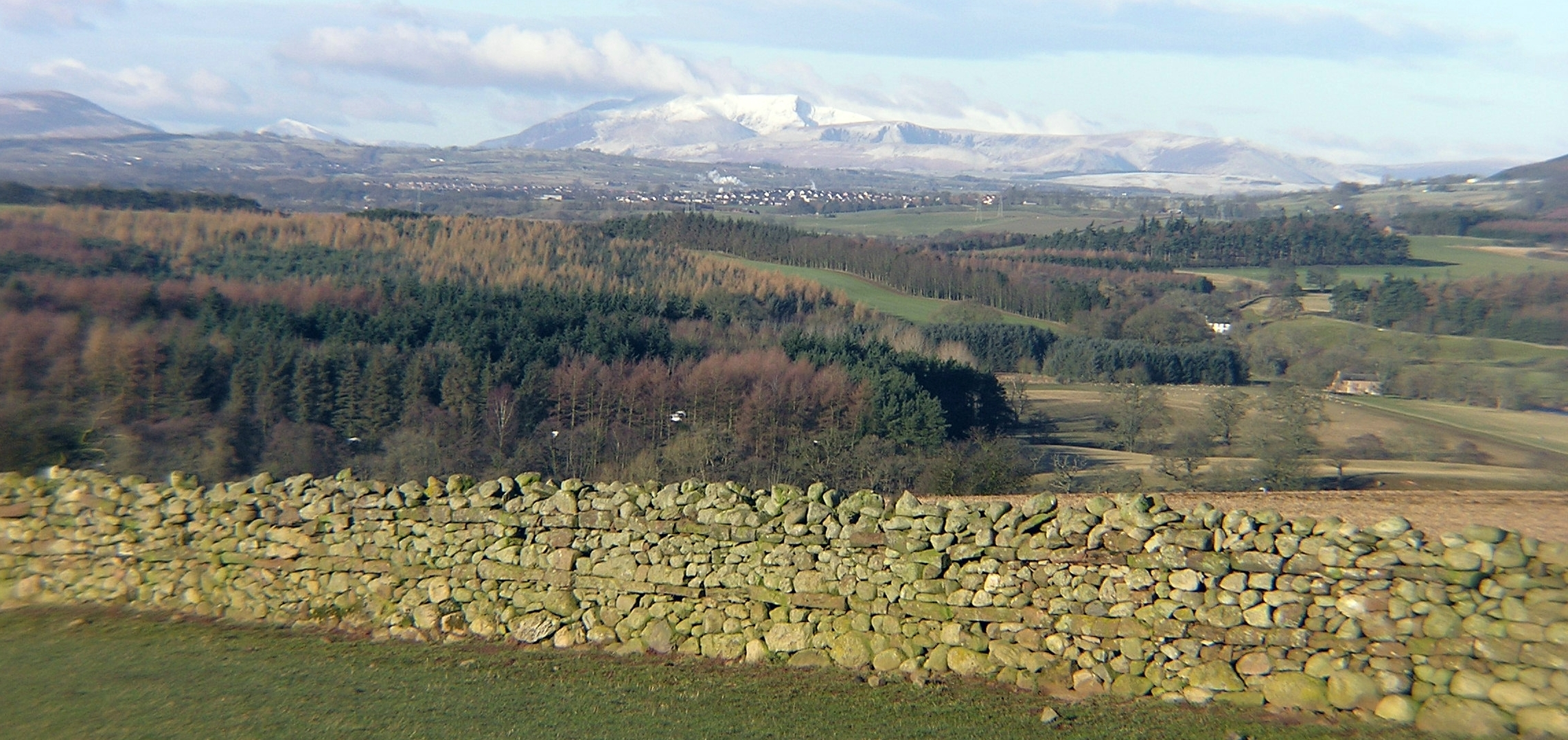
Blencathra and Caldbeck Fells, west of Penrith, viewed from the B6412 road at Culgaith

=== Wells and well-dressing ===
Penrith has many wells. Traditional well-dressing ceremonies took place on days in May. Three miles south-east, on the River Eamont opposite Ninekirks, are the "Giants' Caves", with a well dedicated to St Ninian. These are enlarged out of Lower Permian sandstone and their associated breccias and purple shales.

== Economy ==
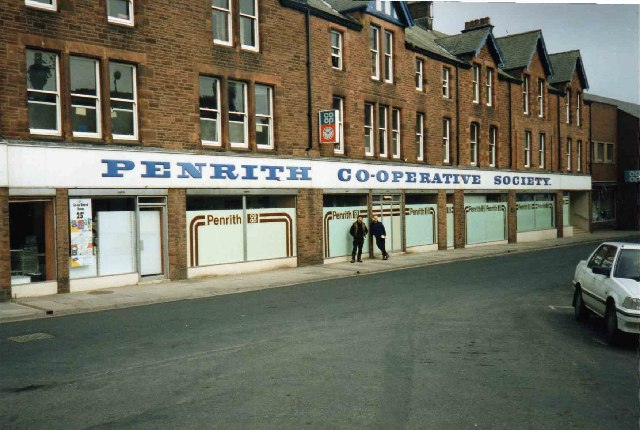
The former Penrith Co-operative Society (1890-2016) had a large department store and supermarket in Burrowgate near the town centre- now closed.

As a market town relying heavily on the tourist trade, Penrith benefits from some high-street chain stores and local specialist shops alongside other businesses such as banks, building societies and travel agents.

Market days are traditionally Tuesday and Saturday. On Tuesdays there was a small outdoor market in Great Dockray and Cornmarket. This ceased in the early 21st century, since when a small farmers' market has been held in the Market Square once a month. On Saturdays, Cumbria's largest outdoor market takes place at the Auction Mart alongside the M6 motorway junction 40.

The main central shopping areas are Middlegate, Little Dockray, Devonshire Street/Market Square, Cornmarket, King Street, Angel Lane and the Devonshire Arcade and Angel Square precincts, with some shops in Burrowgate, Brunswick Road and Great Dockray.

Although the main industries are based around tourism and agriculture, some others are represented. For example, in 2011 Greggs opened a new bakery at Gilwilly, replacing two bakeries in the Friargate area that used to belong to the Penrith-based Birketts firm. Domino's Pizza had a dough manufacturing site at Gilwilly until 2019. The model firm Lilliput Lane (now part of Enesco) was founded in Penrith and until March 2009 had its main factory at Skirsgill Park. Also at Penrith Industrial Estate is the Penrith Door Company factory, formerly part of Magnet Joinery, now of the American-based JELD-WEN group.

Agriculture-based industries include For Farmers, which has a large animal feed mill on the Penrith Industrial Estate. Until 2005 there was another feed mill at Gilwilly, originally belonging to Cumberland and Westmorland Farmers Ltd, but eventually becoming part of the Carrs Milling Industries group. Local butchers Cranstons have an expanding meat packing, pie and sandwich-manufacturing site alongside their shop and head office on Ullswater Road.

Penrith was known for its tanning industry and breweries. The tanneries were mainly in the Friargate/Old London Road area of the town. There were at one time five working breweries. Penrith in recent years has attracted many larger international haulage firms to open depots beside the M6.

Fylde Guitars is a manufacturer of hand-made fretted musical instruments, founded in Penrith in 1973 by luthier Roger Bucknall. Its instruments command high prices. All are hand-made using traditional techniques and have been developed in collaboration with professional players. Fylde Guitars is the only UK guitar maker to have been awarded the Acoustic Guitar Magazine "Gold Award", in 2000.

== Culture and community ==
The Penrith dialect known as Penrithian, spoken around the Penrith and Eden district area, is a variant of the Cumbrian dialect.

=== Nightlife ===
Like other rural towns of its size, Penrith relies on public houses to form the basis of social entertainment. It was once famous for the sheer number of its pubs, served by five working breweries. The trend of pub closures continues, but many remain. They range from small traditional pubs with a loyal clientele to bigger bars that form part of the "circuit". Penrith also has numerous dining places and restaurants.

The Lonsdale (formerly the Alhambra) in Middlegate is a cinema with three screens built in 1910 by William Forrester. There was until the 1980s another cinema called the Regent on Old London Road.

Amateur dramatics and musicals are staged at the Penrith Players Theatre, Ullswater Community College and Queen Elizabeth Grammar School.

=== Regular events ===
- Mayday Carnival: On the first Monday in May, Penrith holds a Mayday Carnival run by Penrith Lions Club. It includes a parade, street dancers and fairground rides in the Great Dockray and Market Square car parks of the commercial area. The procession includes floats, vintage cars and tractors, a marching band, various local celebrities and members of the Penrith Lions Club. It starts in the yard of Ullswater Community College and ends in the bus station car park. Many roads in the centre are closed for the event.
- Penrith Agricultural Show: The first Penrith Show was held in 1834. From 2019 the event takes place on the 3rd Saturday in July.
- The Winter Droving: Held in late October/early November 'The Winter Droving Festival' celebrates all things rural, traditional and fun. The highlight is a torch-lit procession through the town, featuring fire, lanterns, masquerade and music and mayhem. The event is a celebration of Penrith and its age-old role as the market place for the local area, where for centuries livestock and produce has been brought for sale.
- Kendal Calling: Music Festival held in late July each year at Lowther Deer Park has had headline acts that included the Stereophonics, Tinie Tempah, Editors and the Manic Street Preachers.
- Potfest: Ceramics festivals take place as Potfest in the Pens at Skirsgill Auction Mart, and Potfest in the Park at Hutton in the Forest.
- Lowther Show: Held until recently at nearby Lowther Castle each August, this included the Lowther Horse Driving Trials as attended in the past by Prince Philip.

== Media ==
The local newspaper, the Cumberland and Westmorland Herald appears on Saturdays. Sections are updated every following Tuesday on their website. It is independently owned, with offices on King Street, but printed at the Newsquest's printing works in Glasgow, along with the weekly Cumberland News and daily News and Star which also cover some news items from Penrith. A separate edition of the Herald is published for the Keswick area, known as the Lake District Herald.

The free, monthly circulated Eden Local community magazine Cumbrian Local has been posted through doors since 2010 in Penrith and in areas surrounding it in the Eden Valley. It was set up to Eden FM It reached its 200th publication in 2023.

Penrith lies with the ITV Border region and the BBC North East and Cumbria. There were three local radio stations serving the Penrith area. Eden FM which is based in Penrith launched in 2011. There were two others based in Carlisle. These being BBC Radio Cumbria and what was independent station CFM, that from 3 April 2023, rebranded to Greatest Hits Radio.

Penrith was used as a setting in the 1940 book Cue for Treason by Geoffrey Trease. It was also a setting for Bruce Robinson's 1987 film Withnail and I, although the Penrith scenes were actually filmed in Stony Stratford, Buckinghamshire.

== Education ==
=== Uniformed youth organisations ===
Penrith hosts two Community Cadet Forces units: 1247 Squadron of the Air Training Corps and Penrith Detachment of Cumbria Army Cadet Force.

=== Primary schools ===
- Brunswick School (formerly County Infants), Brunswick Road
- Beaconside Primary, Eden Mount/Brent Road. Until 2008 there were separate Beaconside Infant and Junior schools.
- North Lakes School (formerly Wetheriggs Junior; was at first a girls-only school), Huntley Avenue – North Lakes was one of the first schools in England to be awarded a Sing Up Gold Award (in December 2008) and soon after that their highest accolade, a Sing Up Platinum Award.
- St Catherines Roman Catholic Primary, Drovers Lane
- Hunter Hall (private preparatory school), Frenchfield

=== Secondary schools ===
- Ullswater Community College (formerly Ullswater High School, and before that, two single sex secondary modern schools on the same site called Tynefield (girls) and Ullswater (boys)), Wetheriggs Lane
- Queen Elizabeth Grammar School (QEGS) (selective), Ullswater Road

=== Further education ===
- The former Newton Rigg College had its campus just outside the town. Its most recent owner was Askham Bryan College but in the past it has been part of UCLAN and subsequently the University of Cumbria. Since the closure some facilities remain available for public and educational use, for example the Equestrian Centre re-opened in February 2022
- Ullswater Community College had a large further or adult education centre.

Former schools in the town include:

- Girls National School (building now housing school replaced by Beaconside Juniors), Drovers Lane
- Boys National School or St Andrews School for Boys (building now demolished school replaced by Beaconside Juniors), Benson Row
- National Infants School (now Penrith Playgroup Nursery School), Meeting House Lane
- Robinsons School – this was a girls-only school founded with 29 pupils, which later became a mixed (infant) school founded in 1670 by William Robinson, a local merchant who made good in London. It now houses the town's museum and tourist information centre, Middlegate, and has the following inscription above the door: "Ex sumptibus DN Wil Robinson civis Lond anno 1670 DN"
- County Girls School (building now part of Brunswick Infants, the school was replaced by Wetheriggs), Brunswick Road
- County Boys School (the building now QEGS Sixth Form Centre, also for a while an annexe to Wetheriggs). The school merged with Wetheriggs Girls to form Wetheriggs Junior, Ullswater Road
- Tynefield Secondary Modern (originally co-educational but later girls only), Wetheriggs Lane
- Ullswater Secondary Modern (boys only), Wetheriggs Lane. Ullswater and Tynefield schools and buildings merged to create Ullswater High in 1980.

== Religious sites ==
=== Church of England ===
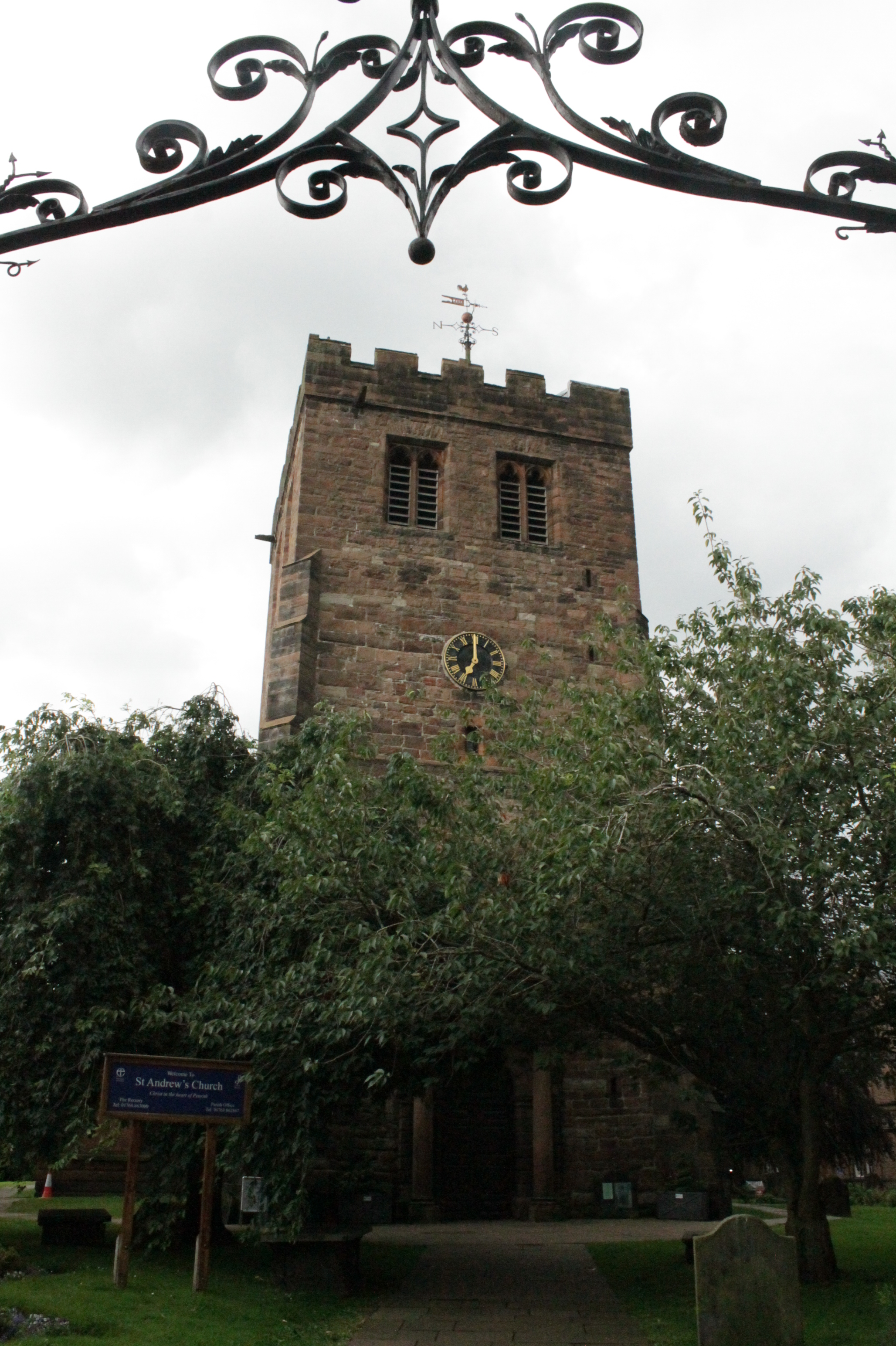
St Andrew's Church, Penrith

- St Andrew's Church is the ancient parish church of Penrith Parish, sited in the centre of Penrith. It is the largest of four parishes making up the Penrith Team Ministry.
- Christ Church, Drovers Lane/Stricklandgate, opened in 1850 as a separate parish, but from 1968 to 2008 was part of the United Parish of Penrith. It is now again a separate parish church for the northern part of the town, remaining within the Penrith Team Ministry.

=== Roman Catholic Church ===
- St Catherine's, Drovers Lane

=== Methodist Church of Great Britain ===
- Penrith Methodist Church, Wordsworth Street

=== Other churches ===
- Society of Friends, Quaker Meeting House, Meeting House Lane
- Gospel Hall Evangelical Church, Albert Street/Queen Street
- King's Church Eden – part of the Newfrontiers family of churches
- Oasis Evangelical Church, Brackenber Court, Musgrave Street
- Salvation Army, Hunter Lane
- Church in the Barn, Newton Road, Penrith (07701011004)https://churchinthebarn.org.uk/ https://www.youtube.com/@ChurchInTheBarnPenrith
- Influence Church Assemblies of God, Burrowgate
- Jehovah's Witnesses, Skirsgill Lane, Eamont Bridge

=== Mosques ===
The town also has two places of worship for Islam. It has an Islamic centre called the "Quba Islamic Centre" and a mosque called the "Al-Amin Mosque". Both are close to each other and on both Middlegate and Bluebell Lane.

== Sport ==
Penrith is home to Penrith Rugby Union Football Club, which currently plays in the RFU National League 3 North. Home games are played at Winters Park in Penrith.

Penrith Netball Club has been active in the town since 2002. They cater for junior players from the age of 11, as well as adults, playing at both secondary schools (QEGS and Ullswater Community College) in the town. Penrith Netball are currently playing in the Carlisle Netball League.

Penrith A.F.C. play in the Northern League Division One.

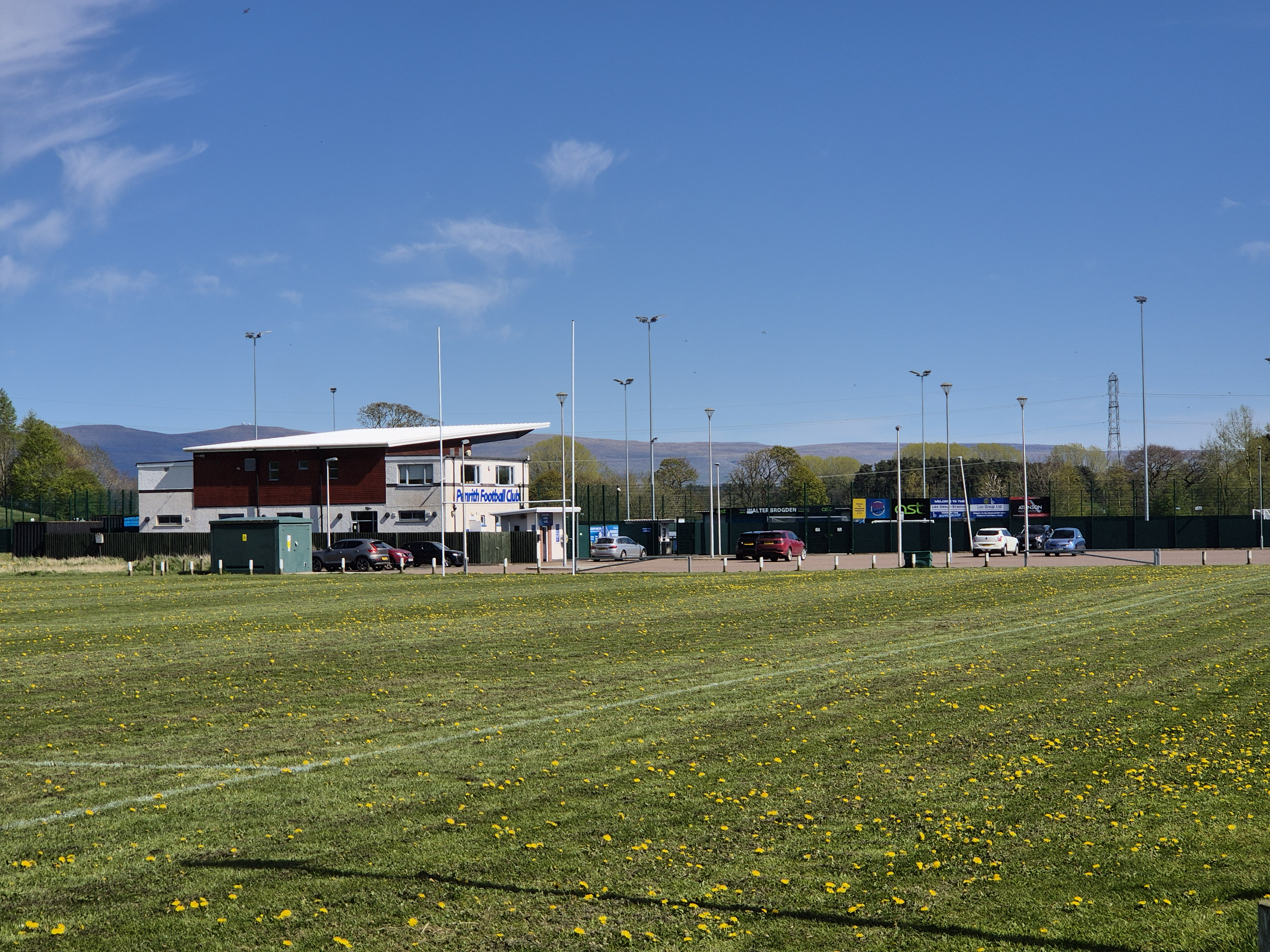
Penrith A.F.C., Frenchfield Park Stadium. Sports Centre playing fields in the foreground, North Pennines in the background

There is a skate park area by the Penrith Leisure Centre. The skate park opened in 2007.

Penrith has a golf club and driving range. Penrith Castle Park houses the town's Bowling Club.

Penrith Swimming Club was founded in 1881 and was then based at Frenchfield in the River Eamont. Training sessions originally involved great variations of conditions that challenged the skills of any swimmer. Icy water, strong currents and obstacles like weed and the odd eel or two provided the ultimate test of stamina. It was all a far cry from conditions for today's training sessions, held at Penrith Leisure Centre.

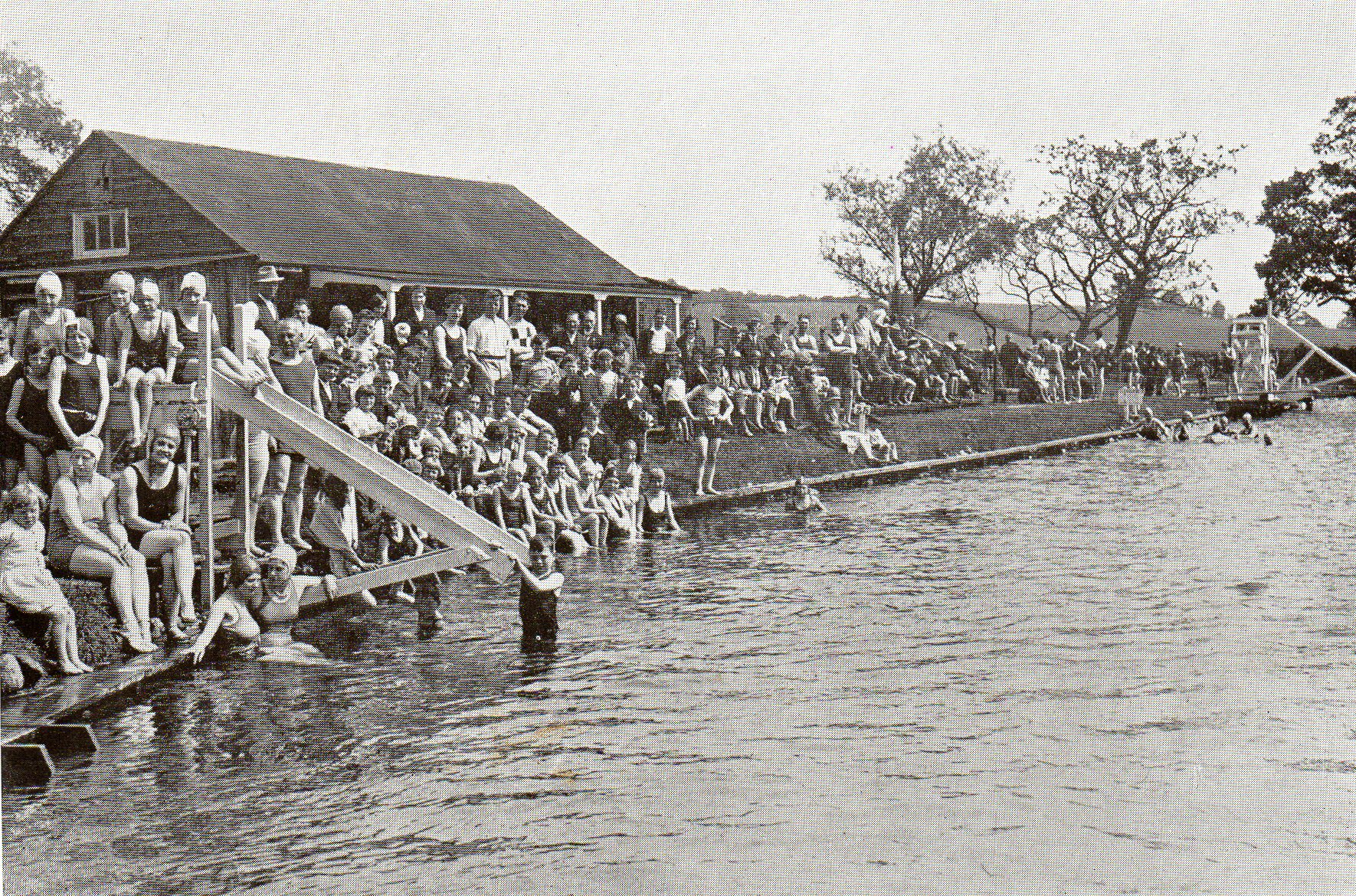
The River Eamont at Frenchfield, the original home of the swimming club

Penrith Canoe Club, founded in 2012, trains at the local leisure centre. Its main activity is canoe polo, in which the club was represented at the World Championships in Syracuse, Italy 2016 by its under-21 women's squad, which finished a respectable fourth.

Penrith Tennis Club is located in the grounds of Penrith Rugby Club at Carleton Village.

British Superbike Championship team Paul Bird Motorsport are based in Penrith. They have won nine riders' championships.

== Transport ==
=== Railway ===
Penrith North Lakes railway station is a stop on the West Coast Main Line. It is served by two train operating companies:

- Avanti West Coast operates inter-city services between London Euston, Glasgow Central and Edinburgh Waverley, with trains calling at Birmingham, Carlisle, Crewe, Lancaster and Preston.
- TransPennine Express operate services between Manchester Airport and Glasgow Central.

=== Buses and coaches ===
Local bus services are operated mostly by Stagecoach Cumbria & North Lancashire, with links to Carlisle, Keswick and Ullswater, with less frequent ones to Windermere, Appleby-in-Westmorland and Kendal. Other buses service the local villages and within the town itself.

The bus station is in the town centre, off Sandgate; many services also stop at the railway station.

National Express operate two long-distance coach routes with stops in Penrith.

=== Roads ===
Penrith is close to junction 40 of the M6 motorway. The A66, A6 and A686 intersect in the town.

The town has several taxi firms licensed by Westmorland and Furness Council. The main rank is in Sandgate in the middle of town, near the bus station, with another outside the railway station.

=== Cycling ===
The National Cycle Network's major National Route 7 runs through the town and National Route 71 stops just short of its southern edge.

== Public services ==
=== Health ===
Penrith Hospital and Health Centre lies along Bridge Lane at the southern entrance to the town, close to the Kemplay Bank roundabout, where the A6, A66 and A686 meet. These are administered by the Cumbria Partnership NHS Trust. It opened in 1970 to replace Jubilee Cottage Hospital on Beacon Edge, Fairhill Fever Hospital and the maternity home at the old workhouse in Castletown. It has wards for the elderly, mental health care and minor injuries, and a Primary Care Assessment unit, a maternity wing and the Lady Anne Clifford Day Hospital. Various weekly clinics are held at the hospital and the adjacent health centre, which opened in 1983 and brought all three NHS medical practices into one building – two have since merged. There is also a pharmacy in the centre.

There are several private and National Health Service dental practices in the town.

=== Police and fire ===
Penrith falls under Cumbria Constabulary, with headquarters at Carleton Hall on the outskirts of the town. The town's own police station was in Hunter Lane, but has since been replaced by a smaller one close to Carleton Hall. Carleton Hall also houses Penrith's fire station and the headquarters of Cumbria Fire and Rescue Service.

=== Ambulance ===
The North West Ambulance Service has a base in Tynefield Drive, close to the hospital. The Great North Air Ambulance Service has its Cumbrian base close to Penrith at Langwathby and was at one time-based at Carleton Hall. The Penrith Mountain Rescue team, whose operating area covers the Eden Valley, North Pennines and the area towards the Scottish border, also has a base in Tynefield Drive.

== Notable people ==
In order of birth:

- Richard, Duke of Gloucester, subsequently Richard III (1452–1485), lived at Penrith Castle for a time. The links to him in the town include two fragments of medieval glass. One in St Andrew's Church is taken to show the heads of Richard Plantagenet and Cecily Neville – Richard III's parents. The other, on display in the town, shows the Musgrave coat of arms. Richard is traditionally thought (with no firm evidence) to have stayed at Dockray Hall (formerly the Gloucester Arms), then a large private house. The bar has panelling of various periods, behind which is an early screen carved with a design taken to be broom (Planta genista), an emblem of the Plantagenet kings.
- Thomas "Scotch Tom" Nelson (1677–1747). Grandfather of Thomas Nelson Jr, a Founding Father of the United States. Emigrated to America c. 1690. Involved in the layout and building of Yorktown, Virginia.
- The Scottish road-builder and engineer John Loudon Macadam (1756–1836), inventor of macadamized roads, lived for a while at Cockell House in Townhead. Close by are streets named Macadam Way and Macadam Gardens.
- John Littlejohn (1756–1836), an American Methodist preacher and circuit-rider, was born in Penrith.
- Penrith was the home town of Annie Cookson, mother of the poet William Wordsworth (1770–1850). The Cooksons lived in a house on the site of what is now Arnison's in Devonshire Street. Wordsworth spent some of his childhood in Penrith, attending school with Mary Hutchinson, his later wife.
- George Leo Haydock (1774–1849), noted for an annotated edition of the Catholic Douay Bible, served as Catholic priest here from 1839 until his death in 1849.
- The Victorian writer Frances Trollope (1779–1863), Anthony Trollope's mother, lived for a while at a house called Carleton Hill (not Carleton Hall) outside the town on the Alston road.
- Jacob Thompson (painter) (1806–1879). Born in Penrith, worked in London and, in later life, in Hackthorpe. (Note: Mullett (2020), pp.278-297)
- Samuel Plimsoll (1824–1898), MP and social reformer, spent some of his childhood at Page Hall in Foster Street. The houses at Townhead called Plimsoll Close are named after him.
- Trooper William Pearson (1826–1909), 4th Light Dragoons. Born and lived in King Street. Took part in the Charge of the Light Brigade,1854. (Note: Mullett (2020), pp.196-200)
- Henry Alleyne Nicholson (1844–1899), palaeontologist and zoologist, was born in Penrith.
- Percy Toplis (1896–1920), the "monocled mutineer", was shot and killed on the run by police at Plumpton, near Penrith. He is buried in Penrith's Beacon Edge Cemetery in an unmarked grave. His monocle is on display in Penrith and Eden Museum.
- Mary (1916–2018), wife of Prime Minister Harold Wilson, lived in Penrith whilst her father was minister at the Congregational Church in Duke Street.
- Stuart Lancaster (born 1969) became head coach of the England national rugby union.
- Paul Nixon (born 1970), Leicestershire wicket-keeper and England cricket international, was born in Carlisle, but grew up in the Penrith area. Nixon retired from professional sport in 2011.
- Angela Lonsdale (born 1970 in Penrith), actress, is perhaps best known as policewoman Emma Taylor in Coronation Street and currently stars as DI Eva Moore in the BBC soap Doctors.
- Charlie Hunnam (born 1980), the actor, attended Queen Elizabeth Grammar School, Penrith (QEGS) and lived locally in his teenage years. He claimed it is "just about the worst place you could hope to live".
- Lewis Brett Guy (born 1985), former professional footballer.
- Danny Grainger (born 1986), footballer, scored Heart of Midlothian's third goal in the 2012 Scottish Cup final against Hibernian.
- Oliver Turvey (born 1987), racing driver, attended Queen Elizabeth Grammar School and lives locally.
- Stephen Hindmarch (born 1989), a professional footballer, was born here.

== Twin town ==
Since 1989, Penrith has had a twinning arrangement with the Australian city named after it in New South Wales.

== See also ==
- Listed buildings in Penrith, Cumbria
- Cockermouth, Keswick and Penrith Railway
