= Prehistoric Cumbria =

History of Cumbria before 100 AD

Prehistoric Cumbria describes the English county of Cumbria prior to the Romans Period. This includes the Mesolithic, Neolithic, Bronze Age, and Iron Age. As of 2010, 443 stone tools, 187 metal objects and 134 ceramic pots, have been unearthed in Cumbria. Likewise, various monuments, such as henges and stone circles, are widespread in the region. The survival of these monuments and objects has been influenced by processes such as the rise in sea levels on the west coast, erosion, deposition practices, industrial and agricultural development, and the changing interests and capabilities of antiquarians and archaeologists.

Cumbria within England

The first permanent inhabitants of the Cumbria region were based in caves during the Mesolithic era. The Neolithic saw the construction of monuments and the running of the axe 'factory' from which stone axes were carried around the country. The Bronze Age saw continuity with the Neolithic way of living and Iron Age Cumbria saw the establishment of Celtic tribes in the region - possibly those called the Carvetii and Setantii by the Romans.

== Earliest human inhabitants: the Late Upper Palaeolithic, c.12670–9600 BC ==
Evidence for human (homo heidelbergensis and Neanderthal) occupation of Britain goes back to c.700,000 years ago. The presence in Britain of homo sapiens can be detected at around 27,000-26,000BC (at Paviland Cave, South Wales).

During the Last Glacial Maximum, between about 26,000 and 19,000 years ago (24,000-17,000BC), Cumbria would have been uninhabitable because it was completely covered by ice sheets. However, the climate warmed during the Late Glacial Interstadial period (Bølling Oscillation-Allerød oscillation periods, c.12670 -10890 BC), giving the opportunity for humans to recolonise Britain. In Britain this period is called the "Windermere interstadial" because continuous deposits around the (Lake) Windermere region show the changing environment at this time from an alpine, herbaceous, covering to one which included woody plants such as tree birch and juniper.

Human reoccupation of Britain (in the south) started around 12700 BC (14700 cal BP), (Note: "cal" refers to calibrated years, a method by which radiocarbon dating is cross-checked with other types of dating evidence, such as tree-rings, to produce what is hoped to be a more accurate estimate of calendar years; "BP" means Before Present, whereby the "present" is taken to mean 1950AD) at the start of the Late Upper Palaeolithic Period. Although there is evidence of human occupation in England (during the so-called Creswellian culture, c.12670 - 12090 BC), there is no evidence that this reached Cumbria. Finds are mostly from caves in the southwest and midland regions of England, and indicate humans feeding on wild horse, reindeer, Arctic hare and red deer, as well as on wild fruits, berries, etc., evidence for which has not survived. Hunter-gathering was the mode of survival.

The first evidence found for human occupation in Cumbria is that at Kirkhead Cave, in Lower Allithwaite, during the Federmesser culture period (c.11400 - 10800 BC). Discussing the Kirkhead Cave finds, Barrowclough quotes an earlier source who says: "Although limited, the Late Upper Paleolithic material from Cumbria is the earliest evidence of settlement in Britain this far north-west and as such is of national importance (Wymer 1981, 77)" (Perhaps this should now read "settlement in England", rather than Britain, as a cave site in Scotland has since been found). Talking of the archaeological finds, he also says: "Lithic material from Kirkhead Cave near Grange...has been dated to... c.11000-9500 BC" (See: Lithic flake). Other lithic blades were found at Lindale Low Cave at the mouth of the River Kent, in caves at Blenkett Wood, Allithwaite, and at Bart's Shelter, Furness (including reindeer and elk bones).

The landscape during the Federmesser site occupations had developed into " a woodland landscape of birch and willow and a mosaic of herbaceous shrub and open grassland species." Red deer, elk, reindeer and large wild bovids were hunted, with fewer wild horse and the disappearance of mammoth marking some change in diet. It is possible that seal and dolphin as well as fish were eaten in coastal sites.

During the following Younger Dryas stadial (colder period), c.10890 - 9650 BC, Federmesser sites were abandoned, and Cumbria (along with the rest of Britain) was not permanently occupied until the end of the Younger Dryas period, 11,600 years ago (that is, during the Mesolithic era).

== Mesolithic, c. 9600–4000 BC ==
The Mesolithic era in Cumbria saw a warming of the climate: it appears to have been below 0 °C on average in c. 8000 BC, but had risen to modern temperatures by 6000 BC. This warming was accompanied by increased rainfall and rising sea-levels: the land bridge to continental Europe had disappeared by around 5300 BC. Despite what must have been substantial loss of coastal land, the overall climatic conditions favoured the movement of humans into the region. The landscape of Cumbria became covered by deciduous woodland, and hazel, birch and pine were predominant. From around 5000 BC, alder became widespread, due to the increased rainfall, with oak and elm decreasing. Red deer, roe deer, elk, auroch, as well as the smaller mammals, cattle, and fish were available as food for humans.

It is thought that settlers made their way across Morecambe Bay and along the fertile coast. At that time the upland central region of the county was heavily forested, so humans probably kept to the coastal areas, and around estuaries in particular: "sheltered locations around estuaries, lagoons or marine inlets" "The reason is probably due to the variety and abundance of food resources combined with fresh water and shelter that make estuaries more favoured locations than purely coastal sites".

Evidence for the Early Mesolithic period in Cumbria is largely confined to finds in caves. In the 1990s, human bones were found in Kents Bank Cavern (in the north Morecambe Bay area) which were in 2013 dated to the early Mesolithic, making the find "the most northerly early Mesolithic human remains in the British Isles". Horse and elk remains, from an earlier date, were also found. For the Late Mesolithic, evidence comes from pits at Monk Moors and burning of heathland in the Eden Valley floodplain.

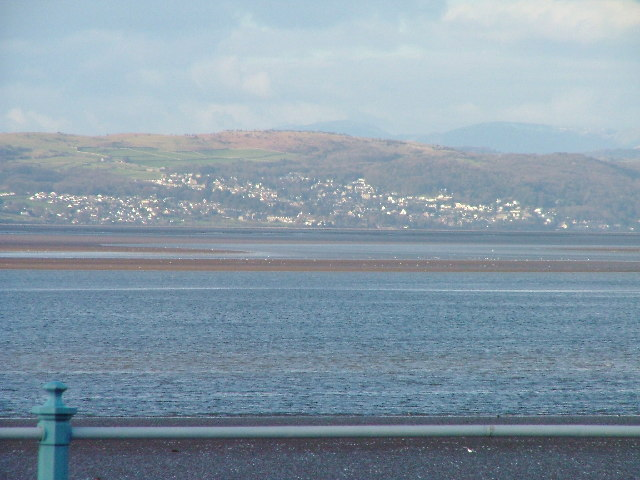
Kents Bank, Cumbria

In the north Cumbrian plain, around the Carlisle area and into southern Scotland, evidence has been found for woodland clearance and deliberate fire-setting as a method of managing the landscape during the Mesolithic period.

Large Mesolithic flint-chipping sites, where flints washed up from the Irish Sea were worked into tools, have been found at Eskmeals, near Ravenglass on the west coast, and at Walney in the south. At Williamson's Moss in the Eskmeals area, Bonsall discovered 34,000 pieces of worked flint (pebble flint), chert and tuff, plus wooden raft-like structures that suggest permanent or semi-permanent settlement by the wandering hunter-gatherer population. Over 30,000 artefacts were discovered at Monk Moors, also part of the Eskmeals raised shoreline area. These sites were probably used across several thousands of years, not just during the Mesolithic.

In the west Cumbrian plain, the evidence comes mainly from raised beaches of former coastlines (formed in the 6th millennium), and in south Cumbria evidence of charcoal burning and small-scale clearing has been found. There is some evidence also of continuing occupation of the caves around Morecambe Bay and in the Levens Park area.

With the disappearance of the elk as the climate changed, Mesolithic Cumbrians would rely on eating wild fowl, small mammals and fish (salmon and trout), with upland areas providing red deer, aurochs and wild pig. There is evidence of widespread trade in items such as flint. An increase in evidence of disturbed ground, wood-clearing and cereal pollen in Cumbria during the 5th millennium BC indicates the transition from the Mesolithic to the Neolithic period. "The evidence suggests that small-scale agriculture may have gradually become part of the Mesolithic repertoire, in addition to the established lifestyle of gathering, hunting and fishing".

The earliest evidence of such cultivation comes from the coasts and the Eden Valley and dates to c. 4000 BC, but the population seems to have been moving around the landscape, particularly up and down the valleys, with fresh water and also the meeting points of valleys (as at Gleaston and Breastmill Beck in Furness) being the main factors for occupation.

== Neolithic, c. 4500–2500 BC ==
There is much more visible evidence of Neolithic activity than of any earlier period. This consists mostly of finds of axes and the presence of monuments (stone circles, cairns, standing stones, and rock art). However, “there are few settlement traces represented either by physical structures or surface flintwork"..."pottery finds are...very poorly represented in Cumbria". This was a time of technological advances and population expansion. The change from Mesolithic to Neolithic in Cumbria was gradual and continual. The change "is marked by the appearance of ...leaf-shaped arrowheads, scrapers and polished stone axes together with pottery and ceremonial and funerary monuments".

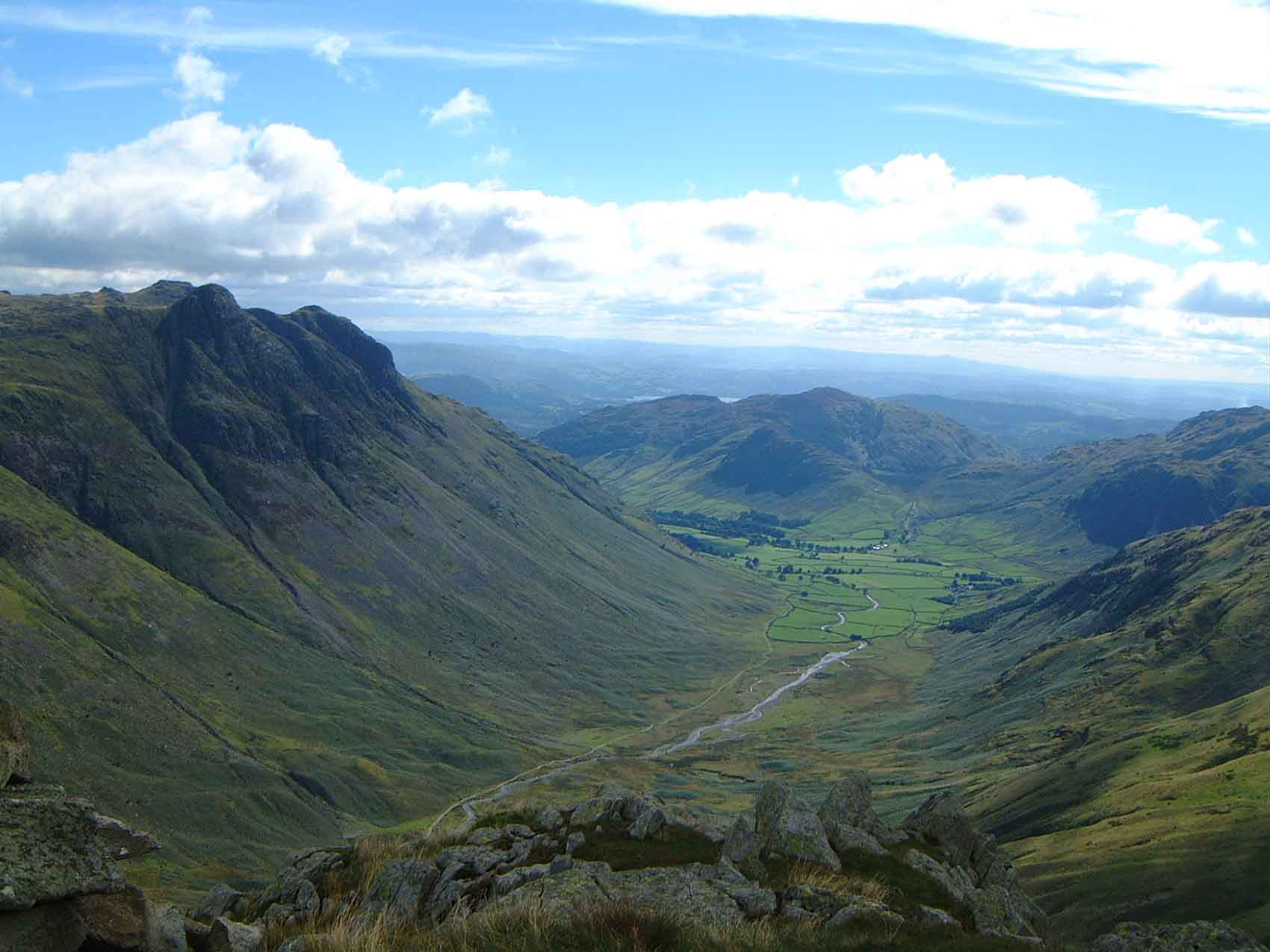
Great Langdale, site of the Langdale Axe Factory

At some time, the Mesolithic coastal communities must have moved further inland, probably following rivers along valley corridors into the heart of Lakeland. But we do not know how many moved. "The small amount of early Neolithic flintwork from the coastal plain has been taken to suggest a move away from the coast inland where the monuments of the Neolithic tend to be located. An alternative view suggests that the same level of coastal settlement and exploitation that had been common in the Mesolithic continued into the Neolithic, but that in the later period there was also an expansion of activity into other parts of the landscape"

Barrowclough, referring to the excavation by Bewley in 1993, says: "Our best evidence for permanent settlement, however, comes from the site of Plasketlands, near Mawbray on the Solway Plain...". Here, a ditched enclosure with large post-holes in an 'annexe' was excavated and has an Early Neolithic dating of c. 4000 - 3300 BC. These enclosures are associated with the building of long cairns, as at Skelmore Heads and Howe Robin, and with stone axes, as at Carrock Fell. Barrowclough goes on to say, however, that Plasketlands is exceptional, and that evidence for Neolithic settlement more often relies on the distribution of found polished stone axes.

Later on, monuments would become more 'institutionalised' and develop into stone circles and henges, reflecting a more localised and settled focus to occupation, as opposed to marking meeting points for trade and exchange as had been the case earlier.

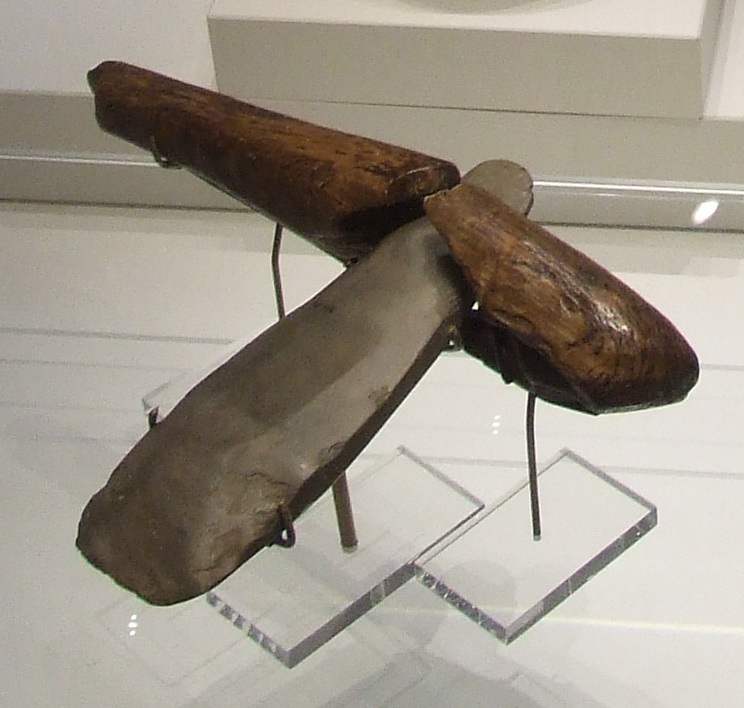
Neolithic stone axe with handle from Ehenside Tarn (now in the British Museum)

The best-known Neolithic site in the West Cumbrian Plain is Ehenside Tarn near Beckermet, with roughout (unfinished) and polished axes, plain bowl pottery, cattle and deer bones. The evidence of deer bones here and at Bardsea in South Cumbria suggests a continuation of hunter-gathering alongside more settled, agricultural, means of living. Ehenside points up the use of wetland areas by Neolithic Cumbrians: the finds there were discovered when the Tarn was drained. "Wetland areas, whether open water or bog, were foci for beliefs and ritual practices alongside contemporary monuments, and it is, therefore, interesting to note there was a standing stone near Ehenside Tarn".

South Cumbria, and especially Furness and Walney, is the area where most of the axe finds have been made (67 examples - accounting for half of the total of axe finds in Cumbria). This is probably due to the area's proximity to the so-called 'Langdale Axe Factory'. Many of the axes seem to have been intentionally deposited in waterlogged areas, or in fissures in rocks. In Cumbria the majority of axe heads originating from Langdale have been found on the Furness Peninsula.

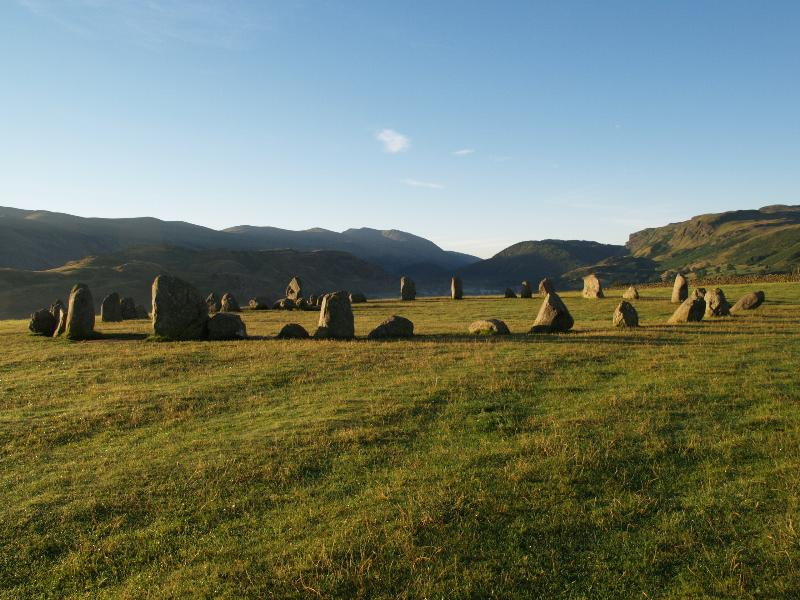
Castlerigg Stone Circle

Indeed, that axe factory is perhaps the most famous and important example of Neolithic activity in Cumbria. Thousands of axe heads were made from green volcanic tuff found on the Lake District Fells between 3800 BC and 3200 BC. The axe heads were evidently not only for local use, as they have been found all over the United Kingdom from Norfolk to Northern Ireland, and seem to have often been used for ceremonial or ritual purposes. The colouring of the stones may have had ritualistic meaning.

Roughout axes have also been found at sites throughout Cumbria, suggesting that axes were originally roughed out at Great Langdale and then sent to various sites where they were finished into a polished state (Ehenside Tarn, near Sellafield and Mossgarth near Portinscale seem to be examples of this 'secondary working'). A later phase indicates more finished and less wasteful working in the Langdale area itself, with fewer 'roughouts' being sent out. Many of these were deposited in wetland areas, perhaps for ritualistic reasons, rather than just having been lost.

Also at this time, possibly reflecting economic power created by the Axe Factory and repeated contact with Ireland, many stone circles and henges were built across the county. Indeed, "Cumbria has one of the largest number of preserved field monuments in England". The Neolithic examples include the impressive enclosure at Mayburgh, near Penrith, and a partly destroyed henge at nearby King Arthur's Round Table (KART); as well as the Castlerigg Stone Circle above Keswick.

The megalith Long Meg, along with Little Meg and a circle at Glassonby were also erected at this time, and feature carvings reminiscent of those found in Ireland. The stone circles, henges, cairns, and standing stones are often grouped at nodes of communication routes. The Shap Stone Avenue to the south of Penrith, (including the Goggleby Stone, the Thunder Stone, the South Shap circle, Skellaw Hill), forms an 'avenue' running to the east of the River Lowther along a main route to the north. The Long Meg complex similarly runs alongside the River Eden, Mayburgh and the other henges run alongside the River Eamont near its confluence with the River Lowther, and Castlerigg was probably on a ridge overlooking wetlands and was a focal point in the landscape.

Many of the stone circles in the county sit on high ground, such as Elva Plain near Cockermouth, and the Burnmoor Stone Circles near Hardknott. As the region was forested during the period, deforested high ground would have been a necessary place to congregate if one wanted to witness the horizon, or the solstice sun.

Some of the county’s standing stones feature carved motifs (spirals, circles, grooves and cup-marks), which may have indicated the presence of other monuments or gathering-places and/or signaled the trackways and other routes through the landscape. In particular, routes through the river valleys to sources of food, to ritual gathering places, or to sources of stone axe quarries.

As well as providing focal points for the gathering of people for the purposes of trade, of ritual, and, in the Late Neolithic, for more 'tenurial' settlement and ownership of land, the stone circles probably had cosmological uses as well. For example, the Long Meg stone itself, which stands outside its accompanying circle, is aligned with the circle's centre on the point of the midwinter sunset. The use of different coloured stones here is possibly linked to observations made at the times of equinoxes and solstices.

== Bronze Age, c. 2500–700 BC ==
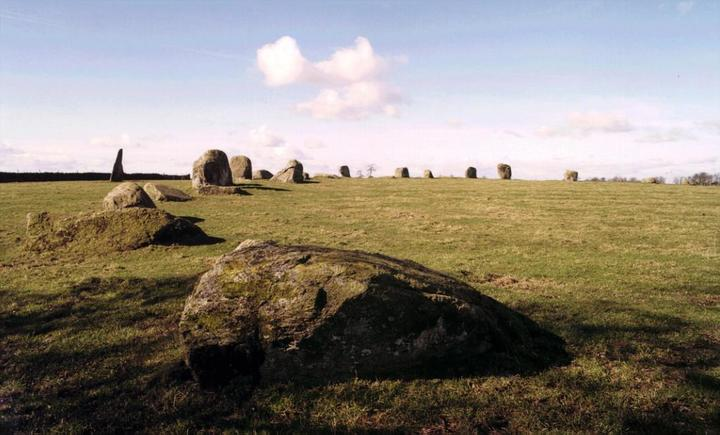
Long Meg and Her Daughters

By the Bronze Age, settlements in Cumbria are likely to have taken a much more permanent form. Like the transition from Mesolithic to Neolithic, the transition from Neolithic to Early Bronze Age was gradual and continuity of sites is likely. Unlike in southern England, where the transition is marked by the 'Beaker Period', in Cumbria and the north-west burials with beaker pottery are rare, with only a handful of such burials recorded. (Instead, circular wooden and then stone structures subsequently sealed by cairns and used over centuries was the preferred method).

In the Early Bronze Age, evidence of greatly increased woodland clearing combined with cereal growing has been found in the pollen record for the North Cumbrian Plain, Solway Firth and the coastal areas. Very little evidence of occupation exists, although a number of potential sites have been identified by aerial photographic work. The site at Plasketlands seems typical of "a combination of arable, grazing, peat, alluvium and marine resources".

Collared urns have been found at sites such as the former Garlands Hospital (now the Carleton Clinic near Carlisle), Aughertree Fell, Aglionby, and at Eskmeals (with a cist burial, cremation pits, and a flint-knapping site). Activity round the Morecambe Bay region seems to have been less than in the West Cumbrian Coastal Plain, although there is evidence for significant settlement on Walney Island, and at Sizergh, Levens Park and Allithwaite where Beaker burials took place.

This southern area of the county also has approximately 85 examples of perforated axe-hammers, rarely found in the rest of the county. These, like the Neolithic stone axes, seem to have been deposited deliberately (with axe finds being more coastal in distribution). The increase in the use of these perforated axes probably accounted for the decline in the Langdale axe factory which occurred c. 1500 BC. "New designs of perforated stone axes were developed, and Langdale tuffs were discovered by experiment to be too fragile to allow perforation." Non-perforated axes were abandoned and other sources of lithic material were sought from other parts of the England. Copper and bronze tools only seem to have arrived in Cumbria very gradually through the 2nd millennium. Indeed, by c. 1200 BC there is evidence of a breakdown in technology usage and trade between the northern, highland areas, including Cumbria, and the southern areas of the country. This was not compensated for by home-grown metallurgical working.

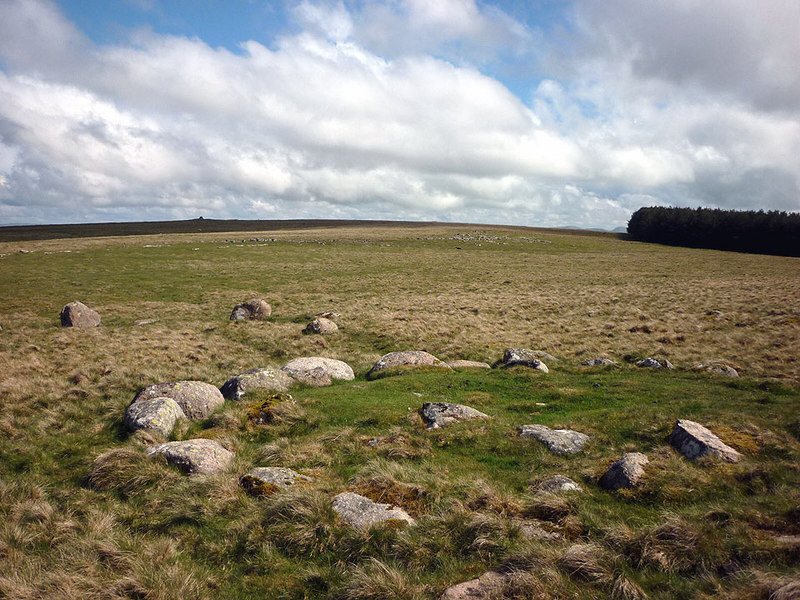
Cairn circle, Oddendale

In terms of burial practices, both inhumations (burials of non-cremated bodies) and cremations took place in Cumbria, with cremations (268) being more favoured than inhumations (51). Most burials were associated with cairns (26) but other monuments were also used: round barrows (14); 'flat' cemeteries (12); stone circles (9); plus use of ring cairns, standing stones and other monuments. Burials for inhumations (in barrows and cairns) are found on the surface, as at Oddendale, or in pits, usually with a cist formed in it, as at Moor Divock, Askham. Cremation burials may also be found "in a pit, cist, below a pavement, or roughly enclosed by a stone cist". Often, there are multiple burials not associated with any monument - another indication of continuity with Neolithic practice. Cremated bones placed in food vessels was followed by a later practice of placement in collared or uncollared urns, although many burials had no urns involved at all. A capping stone was often placed on the urn, which could be either upright or inverted. Ritualistic deposition into Cumbrian grave-sites include: broken artefacts, such as single beads from a necklace (as at Ewanrigg); sherds of Beaker or Collared Urn pottery; bone pins, buttons, jet, slate, clay ornaments; ochre, or red porphyry and quartz crystals (as at Birkrigg, Urswick); knives, daggers and hunting equipment.

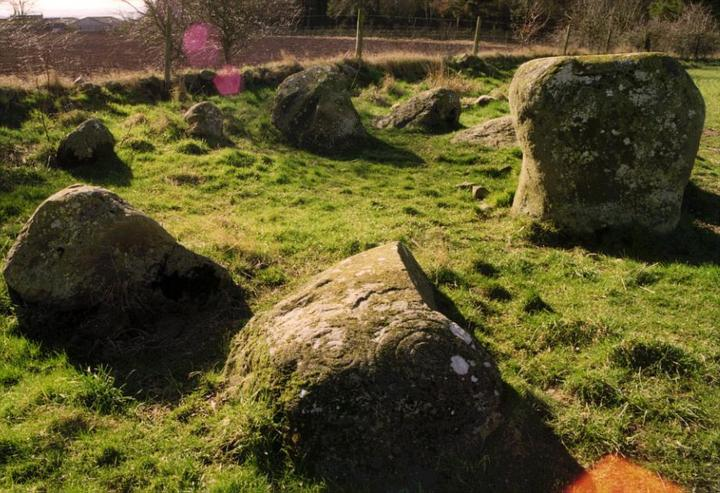
Little Meg - a Bronze Age ring cairn with spiral rock art

Bronze Age artefacts have been uncovered throughout the county, including several bronze axe heads around Kendal and Levens, an axe and a sword at Gleaston, a rapier near the hamlet of Salta, an intriguing carved granite ball near Carlisle and part of a gold necklace believed to be from France or Ireland found at Greysouthen. Most notably and recently a current total of six bronze socketed axe heads of varying size and pre-burial condition, along with sword fragments inside one of the axe sockets, were found at Millom by metal detectorist Josh Carr. Geophysics surveys starting in 2023 hope to discover evidence of a hill fort or settlement. A timber palisade has also been discovered at High Crosby near Carlisle. Again, there is continuity between Bronze-age and Neolithic practice of deposition. There seems to be an association between the distribution of stone perforated axe-hammers and bronze metalwork deposition in the area of Furness. Of the approximately 200 bronze implements found in Cumbria, about half have been found in the Furness and Cartmel region. Most are flanged axes (21), and flanged spearheads (21), palstaves (20), and flat and socketed axes (16 each). Early Bronze Age metalwork distribution is largely along communication valleys (such as the Eden valley), and on the Furness and West Cumbrian plains, with evidence on the west coast (for example, a find at Maryport) of connections with Ireland. In the Middle Bronze Age, deposition seems to have switched from burials to wet places, presumably for ritualistic reasons. In the Late Bronze Age, socketed axe finds are the most common (62), but are rare in West Cumbria, which also lacks finds of the angle-flanged type. Hoards (two or more items) of deposited Bronze Age metalwork are rare in Cumbria, (notably at Ambleside, Hayton, Fell Lane, Kirkhead Cave, Skelmore Heads), for reasons that are still being discussed. Most are from the Middle Bronze Age period.

As mentioned above, evidence of actual metalworking in Cumbria during this period is scarce. There is some sign of copper ore extraction around the Coniston area, but the most notable find is of a tuyère, (a clay pipe connecting the bellows to a furnace), found at Ewanrigg and which is a rare example from the Early Bronze Age. Two-part stone moulds have also been found at Croglin.

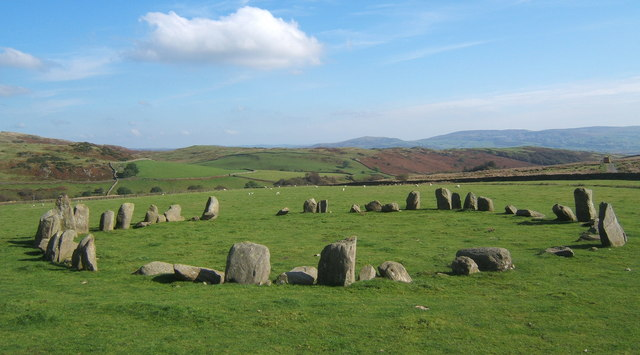
Swinside stone circle

Ritual or 'religious' sites can be seen across the county and are often clearly visible. Cairns and round barrows can be found throughout the area and a cemetery has been discovered near Allithwaite. More impressive remains include stone circles, such as Birkrigg stone circle, Long Meg and Her Daughters, Swinside, and Little Meg. 32 bronze artefacts have been discovered in the Furness district covering a long period of time (c. 2300 - 500 BC), suggesting that this region was held to have special meaning to the people there. In the Late Bronze Age, defended hilltop settlements along the northern shore of Morecambe Bay, with metalworking, special functions and long-term deposition of artefacts associated with them, were probably precursors to later Iron Age hill-forts. However, many of these defended settlements appear to have been abandoned, probably due to a deterioration in the climate from c. 1250 BC to roughly the beginning of the Iron Age.

== Iron Age, c. 800 BC–100 AD ==
The Iron Age in Britain saw the arrival of Celtic culture - including certain art forms and languages - as well as the obvious increase in the production of iron. The people of Great Britain and Ireland were divided into various tribes: in Cumbria the Carvetii may have dominated most of the county for a time, perhaps being based in the Solway Plain and centred on Carlisle, although an alternative view has their pre-Roman centre at Clifton Dykes. The Setantii were possibly situated in the south of the county, until both were perhaps incorporated into the Brigantes who occupied much of northern England. (The status - especially that of the relationship with the Brigantes - and location of the Carvetii and Setantii is disputed by historians). They probably spoke Cumbric, a variety of the ancient British language of Brythonic, (or Common Brittonic), the predecessor of modern Welsh, and probably named some of the county's topographical features such as its rivers (e.g. Kent, Eden, Cocker, Levens) and mountains (e.g. Blencathra).

There appear to be many remains of Iron Age settlement in Cumbria, including hill forts such as those at Maiden Castle and Dunmallard Hill and many hundreds of smaller settlements and field systems. However, securely dateable evidence of Iron Age activity in Cumbria is thin. In North Cumbria, hillforts have been dated to c. 500 BC at Carrock Fell and Swarthy Hill, as well as a burial at Rise Hill and a bog body at Scaleby Moss.

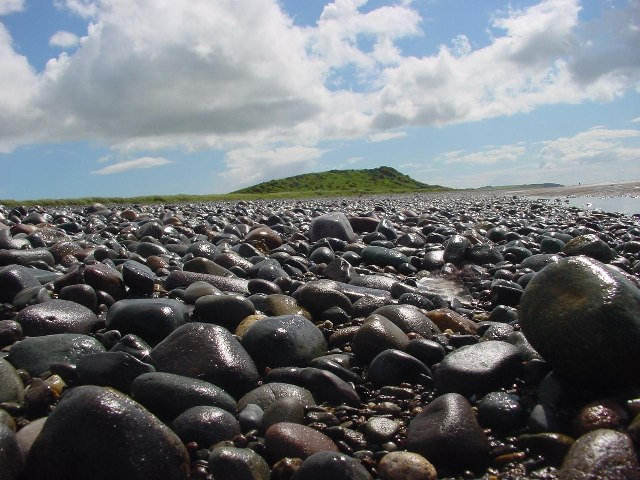
Swarthy Hill, near Crosscanonby on the Solway coast - possible site of Iron Age hillfort, later the site of milefortlet 21 in Roman times

A large number of enclosure sites have been identified from aerial photographs in the Solway Plain. There are also possible sites re-used by the Romans at Bousted Hill and Fingland, as well as at Ewanrigg and Edderside. Early Iron Age finds in West Cumbria are limited to sites at Eskmeals and Seascale Moss (with another bog body). In the south, 'hillforts' have been identified at Skelmore Heads, Castle Head, Warton Crag and an enclosure at Urswick. However, Cumbria appears not to have any of the so-called 'developed hillforts' (enlarged from earlier versions, around 3-7ha in area, with multiple ditches and complex entrances), suggesting that few, if any, were still being used in the pre-Roman Iron Age, apparently having been abandoned.

The abandonment of land and settlements noted above is probably explained by climate change. Between c. 1250 BC and c. 800 BC, the climate deteriorated to the extent that, in Cumbria, upland areas and marginal areas of cultivation were no longer sustainable. Woodland clearing happened, however, combined with signs of increased soil erosion: production capacity may have been seriously affected, with agriculture being forcibly replaced by pastoralism, and with a resultant "population crisis" at the beginning of the Iron Age.

However, an improvement in climatic conditions from c. 800 BC to c. 100 AD occurred. A major de-forestation period, linked to increased cereal production, seems to have taken place (according to pollen records) towards the end of the 1st millennium BC. This is also associated with a slight rise in sea level that may explain the lack of evidence for low-lying settlements. There is sparse evidence for the Late Iron Age and early Romano-British periods. Nevertheless, enclosures seen from aerial photography in upland areas such as Crosby Garrett and Crosby Ravensworth, together with similar evidence from the Solway Plain and Eden Valley, (see the section below on Life in Roman Cumbria for a listing of the main sites), point to the populous nature of the territory held by the Brigantes (as noted by Tacitus in the 'Agricola'). The view of historians now seems to be that the hillforts were becoming centres of economic activity and were less in the nature of dominating power-centres. "Indeed, the north-west, far from being a backward region of Britain in the late Iron Age, can be seen as progressive and entrepreneurial." This was true, however, only in certain areas of the north-west: the Solway Plain, the Eden and Lune valleys, and perhaps southern Cumbria and Cheshire, which may have been "thriving".

The traditional Iron Age roundhouse, enclosed by a ditch and revetted bank, was used by the Carvetii. Sometimes, dry-stone walls were used instead of the bank. However, a roundhouse at Wolsty Hall has two opposed entrances and a ring-grooved external wall, which may indicate a northern, regional variety of roundhouse building.

(Later, in the mid-Roman period, probably in the 3rd century, a change took place in that the round structures were replaced by rectilinear buildings on some sites).

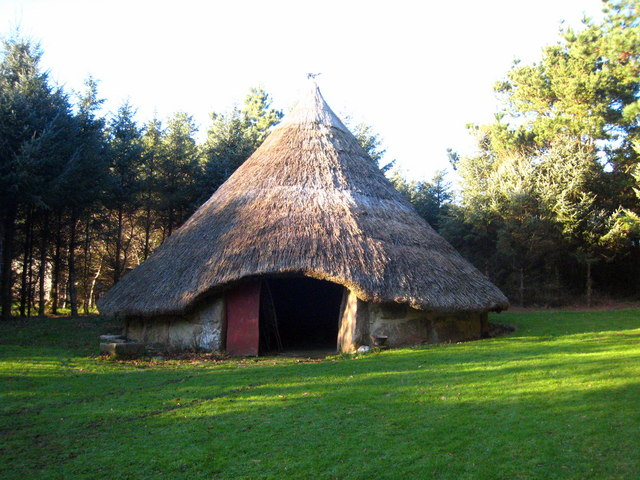
Iron Age roundhouse reconstruction

Most of the population, the total size of which at its peak has been estimated at between 20,000-30,000 people, lived in scattered communities, usually consisting of just a single family group. They practised mixed agriculture, with enclosures for arable use, but also with enclosed and unenclosed pasture fields.

Evidence of burial practices is extremely rare. Inhumations have been found at Risehow, and possibly at Butts Beck (crouched individuals in pits and ditches) as well as two very rare cemeteries with multiple individuals (only approximately 30 Iron Age cemeteries exist in Britain in total) at Nelson Square, Levens and at Crosby Garrett. The Butts Beck burial included the body of a 'warrior' along with his weapons and a horse (although this might have been a horse and cart burial, rather than a warrior one, with the wooden cart having rotted away). The bog body at Scaleby and the one at Seascale are difficult to date, and, since the excavations were done in the 19th century and lacked today's archaeological techniques, the evidence for Druidical ritual sacrifice, as appears with some other bog bodies in Britain and Europe, is not present in the Cumbrian examples. However, both bodies were buried with a wooden stick or wand, which conforms to other bog-burial practice elsewhere. The finding of stone heads at Anthorn and at Rickerby Park, Carlisle, also conforms to the Celtic cult of the severed head and ritualistic sacrifice. This may be true also of the bronze buckets or cauldrons deposited at Bewcastle and at Ravenstonedale which indicate connections with Ireland. The early name of Carlisle, 'Luguvalium', meaning 'belonging to Luguvalos', suggests a tribal chief in charge who had a personal name that meant 'strong as Lugus'. This indicates a possible affinity of the tribe there (perhaps the Carvetii) to the Celtic god Lugus, whose festival, Lugnasad, occurred on 1 August, accompanied by various sacrifices.

Hoards of deposited Cumbrian Iron Age metalwork show evidence of a regional variation, with Cumbrian hoards being mostly of weapons buried off-site and consisting of small numbers of items. This fits the picture of Iron Age Cumbria, as with the rest of the north-west, consisting mostly of small, scattered, farmsteads. In the 18th century a beautiful iron sword with a bronze scabbard, dating from around 50 BC, was found at Embleton near Cockermouth; it is now in the British Museum.

== Sources ==
- Barrowclough, David (2010). Prehistoric Cumbria. Stroud: The History Press. pp. [1]–251. ISBN 9780752450872.
- Barton, Nicholas (2009). "The lateglacial or latest Palaeolithic occupation of Britain". In John Hunter; Ian Ralston (eds.). The archaeology of Britain : an introduction from earliest times to the twenty-first century (2nd ed.). London: Routledge. pp. xvii, 454. ISBN 9780415477178.
- Beckensall, Stan (2002). Prehistoric rock art in Cumbria: landscapes and monuments. Stroud: Tempus. pp. [1]–160. ISBN 9780752425269.
- Bewley, R. H. (1992). "Excavation of two cropmark sites in the Solway Plain, Cumbria: Ewanrigg settlement and Swarthy Hill, 1986-1988". Transactions of the Cumberland and Westmorland Antiquarian and Archaeological Society. 2. 92: 23–47, quoted by Barrowclough, p.183. doi:10.5284/1061553.
- Bewley, R. H. (1993). "Survey and excavation at a crop-mark enclosure, Plasketlands, Cumbria". Transactions of the Cumberland and Westmorland Antiquarian and Archaeological Society. 2. 93: 1–18. doi:10.5284/1061526.
- Bewley, Robert (1994). Prehistoric and Romano-British settlement in the Solway Plain, Cumbria. Oxbow monograph, 36. Oxford: Oxbow Books. pp. 1–100. ISBN 9780946897667.
- Bonsall, C. (1981). "The coastal factor in the Mesolithic settlement of North West England". In B. Gramsch (ed.). Mesolithikum in Europa. Potsdam: Veröffentichungen des museums fur Ur-und Frühgeschichte. pp. 451–72.
- Clare, Tom (2007). Prehistoric monuments of the Lake District. Stroud: Tempus. pp. [1]–159. ISBN 9780752441054.
- Collingwood, R. G. (1933). "An introduction to the prehistory of Cumberland, Westmorland and Lancashire-north-of-the-Sands". Transactions of the Cumberland and Westmorland Antiquarian and Archaeological Society. 2. 33: 184, p. 163–200. doi:10.5284/1063168.
- Cunliffe, B. (1984). "Iron Age Wessex : continuity and change". In Cunliffe, B; Miles D. (eds.). Aspects of the Iron Age in central Southern Britain. Oxford: Oxford University Committee for Archaeology. pp. vi, 209, p. 12–45. ISBN 9780947816025.
- Evans, H. (2008). Neolithic and Bronze Age landscapes of Cumbria. British Archaeological Reports, British series, no.463. Oxford: Archaeopress. pp. viii, 242. ISBN 9781407302973.
- Fell, C. (1940). "Bronze Age connections between the Lake District and Ireland". Transactions of the Cumberland and Westmorland Antiquarian and Archaeological Society. 2. 40: 118–130. doi:10.5284/1062982.
- Higham, N. J. (1986). The Northern counties to AD 1000. A regional history of England. London: Longman. pp. xx, 1–392. ISBN 978-0582492769.
- Higham, N. J.; Jones, G. D. B. (1985). The Carvetii. Peoples of Roman Britain. Stroud: Alan Sutton. pp. xiii, 1–158. ISBN 978-0862990886.
- Hunter, F. (1997). "Iron Age hoarding in Scotland and northern England". In Gwilt, A.; Haselgrove C. (eds.). Reconstructing Iron Age societies. Oxbow monograph, 71. Oxford: Oxbow. pp. 108–33.
- Ibbotson, A. M. (2021). Cumbria’s Prehistoric Monuments, History Press ISBN 0750996684
- Pennington, W. (1970). "Vegetational history of north-west England : a regional study". In Walker, D.; West R. (eds.). Studies in the vegetational history of the British Isles. Cambridge: Cambridge University Press. pp. 41–79.
- Pettit, Paul; White, Mark (2012). The British Palaeolithic: Human Societies at the Edge of the Pleistocene World. Abingdon, UK: Routledge. pp. xix, 592. ISBN 978-0-415-67455-3.
- Ross, Catherine (2012). "The Carvetii - a pro-Roman community?". Transactions of the Cumberland and Westmorland Antiquarian and Archaeological Society. 3. 12: 55–68. doi:10.5284/1063921.
- Shotter, David (2004). Romans and Britons in North-West England (3rd ed.). Lancaster: Centre for North-West Regional Studies, University of Lancaster. pp. xii, 204. ISBN 978-1862201521.
- Smith, I. R.; Wilkinson, D. M.; O'Regan, H. J. (September 2013). "New Lateglacial fauna and early Mesolithic human remains from northern England". Journal of Quaternary Science. 28 (6): 542–544. doi:10.1002/jqs.2655.
- Turner, R. C. (1988). "A Cumbrian bog body from Scaleby". Transactions of the Cumberland and Westmorland Antiquarian and Archaeological Society. 2. 88: 1–7. doi:10.5284/1061666.
- Turner, R. C. (1989). "Another Cumbrian bog body, found in Seascale Moss in 1834". Transactions of the Cumberland and Westmorland Antiquarian and Archaeological Society. 2. 89: 21–23. doi:10.5284/1061636.
- Wymer, J. J. (1981). "The Paleolithic". In I. Simmons; M. J.Tooley (eds.). The environment in British prehistory. London: Duckworth. pp. 49–81.
