= Long Meg and Her Daughters =

Neolithic stone circle near Penrith, England

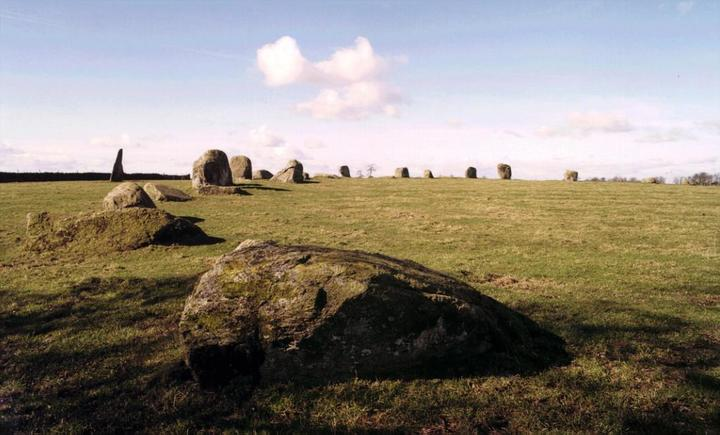
- The monolith Long Meg (on the horizon at top left) and the southern arc of the circle

- Location in Cumbria, England
- 54.72794°N 2.66765°W
- Type: Stone circle
- Periods: Neolithic
- Location: Hunsonby, Cumbria, England

History
- Built: c. 3500 BC

Site notes
- Public access: Yes

Long Meg and Her Daughters is a Neolithic stone circle situated north-east of Penrith near Little Salkeld in Cumbria, North West England. One of around 1,300 stone circles in the British Isles and Brittany, it was constructed as a part of a megalithic tradition that emerged during Neolithic, and continued into the Early Bronze Age (c. 3200 - 2500 BC).

The stone circle is the third widest in England, behind Avebury in Wiltshire and Stanton Drew in Somerset. It consists of 66 stones (of which 27 remain upright) set in an east / west oval configuration measuring 380 ft (120 m) on its long axis. There may originally have been as many as 77 stones, as this was mentioned by William Camden in the 16th century. Long Meg herself is a 12 ft (3.7 m) high monolith of red sandstone 80 ft (24 m), standing to the southwest of the circle. The stone is marked with examples of megalithic art including a cup and ring mark, a spiral, and rings of concentric circles. This art mirrors examples from Neolithic Ireland, including the contemporary Newgrange. The composition and position of the stone is similar to that of the Altar Stone, at Stonehenge, and may be part of a similar tradition of using red sandstone to mark the solstice.

Infra-red aerial photography has identified several Early Neolithic enclosures. These include a so-called 'super henge', a possible cursus monument, and a henge similar to examples found near Millom to the far west of Cumbria. These appear to pre-date the stone circle, and its northern edge dips to avoid the lost ditch. There is also the smaller kerbed burial mound of Little Meg to the north.

== Location ==
The Long Meg monolith and accompanying circle forms one part of a complex of monuments in the Penrith area that includes, as well as the nearby Little Meg circle, a smaller circle seen by William Stukeley in 1725 to the south-west, no longer extant, plus the impressive Mayburgh Henge at Eamont Bridge, a partly destroyed henge at nearby King Arthur's Round Table, and a third, completely destroyed, henge just a few yards to the south of King Arthur's Round Table. The terrace upon which Long Meg and the circle sit extends along the River Eden, alongside several other monuments. These include: Little Meg, Glassonby Stone Circle, and the lost Old Parks Cairn, all of which are decorated with rock art.

The stone circles, henges, cairns and other standing stones in the area are often grouped near water (rivers, springs), possibly for religious or cosmological reasons. The Shap Stone Avenue to the south of Penrith, (including the Goggleby Stone, the Thunder Stone, Skellaw Hill, as well as Oddendale to the east), forms an 'avenue' running to the east of the River Lowther along a main route to the north; the Long Meg complex runs alongside the River Eden; Mayburgh and the other henges run alongside the River Eamont near its confluence with the River Lowther.

Long Meg and her Daughters lie on a terrace above water, immediately to the south of a ditched enclosure that runs round the present farm. This ditch seems to pre-date the circle of stones, as the latter is deliberately flattened to take the enclosure into account. A spring lies just above the northern perimeter of the enclosure, and another spring may have existed within the enclosure itself. Another, smaller, enclosure lies to the south-east. Although the circle appears to have been built on a slope, Clare suggests that the large enclosure was made across a valley up to 16 ft (4.9 m) deep. This valley leads to the River Eden where deposits of gypsum are found. It is possible, therefore, like the henges at Thornborough in North Yorkshire, that the banks of the ditched enclosure and the stone circle "may have been white."

== Construction ==
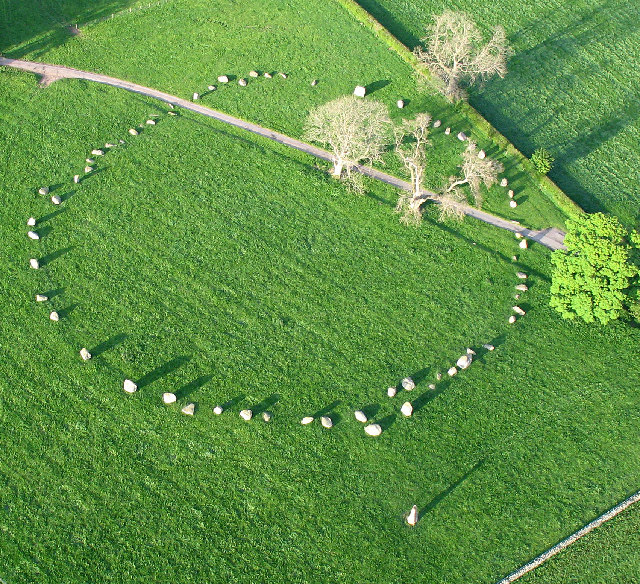
Long Meg and Her Daughters, photographed at 19:37 on 14 May 2005. Long Meg is near the bottom of the picture.

The monument is 120 m (390 ft) × 100 m (330 ft) in diameter. Long Meg herself stands 80 ft (24 m) outside the circle, 20 ft (6.1 m) above the farthest stone in the circle, "and is the tallest of the 69 stones at 12 ft (3.7 m) high and weighing c. 9 tons (tonnes)." The Long Meg monolith is of local red sandstone, probably from the River Eden or the nearby Lazonby hills, whereas the circle stones are of rhyolite and are glacial erratics. Two large blocks are placed to the east and west and there are two extra 'portal' stones placed to the south-west. The placement of Long Meg is in the alignment between the centre of the circle and the point of the midwinter sunset. The south-west face of Long Meg has crystals in it, whereas the face looking towards the circle has spirals and other rock art inscribed on it.

The circle may have had a bank running round some of the stones at least, and the centre may have been scraped out to some extent.

The English antiquary William Dugdale reported that there were "two barrows of cobble-stones, nine or ten feet high" in the centre of the circle. It is thought that these were later burials using cobbles from the surrounding area.

Four of the stones in the circle appear to be non-local and are formed of quartz crystal. They seem to have been deliberately selected and placed at specific points in the circle that mark certain calendrical events (sunsets and solstices related to the four seasons, for example). They work by standing outside the circle at the stone directly opposite to the quartz stone concerned. One alignment, at Samhain/All Souls' Day, may involve Long Meg herself, a portal stone and one of the quartz stones.

The use of different coloured stones also seems to be significant – red, white and blue/grey predominate (Long Meg herself being of red sandstone). There might also be a red 'equinox stone' on the east side of the Long Meg circle (as at Swinside and Castlerigg stone circle), involved in the autumn equinox and vernal equinox sunrises and sunsets. The Long Meg stones may be involved not just with solar timings, but also with lunar ones as well (most northerly/southerly Moon rises and sets).

== Rock art ==
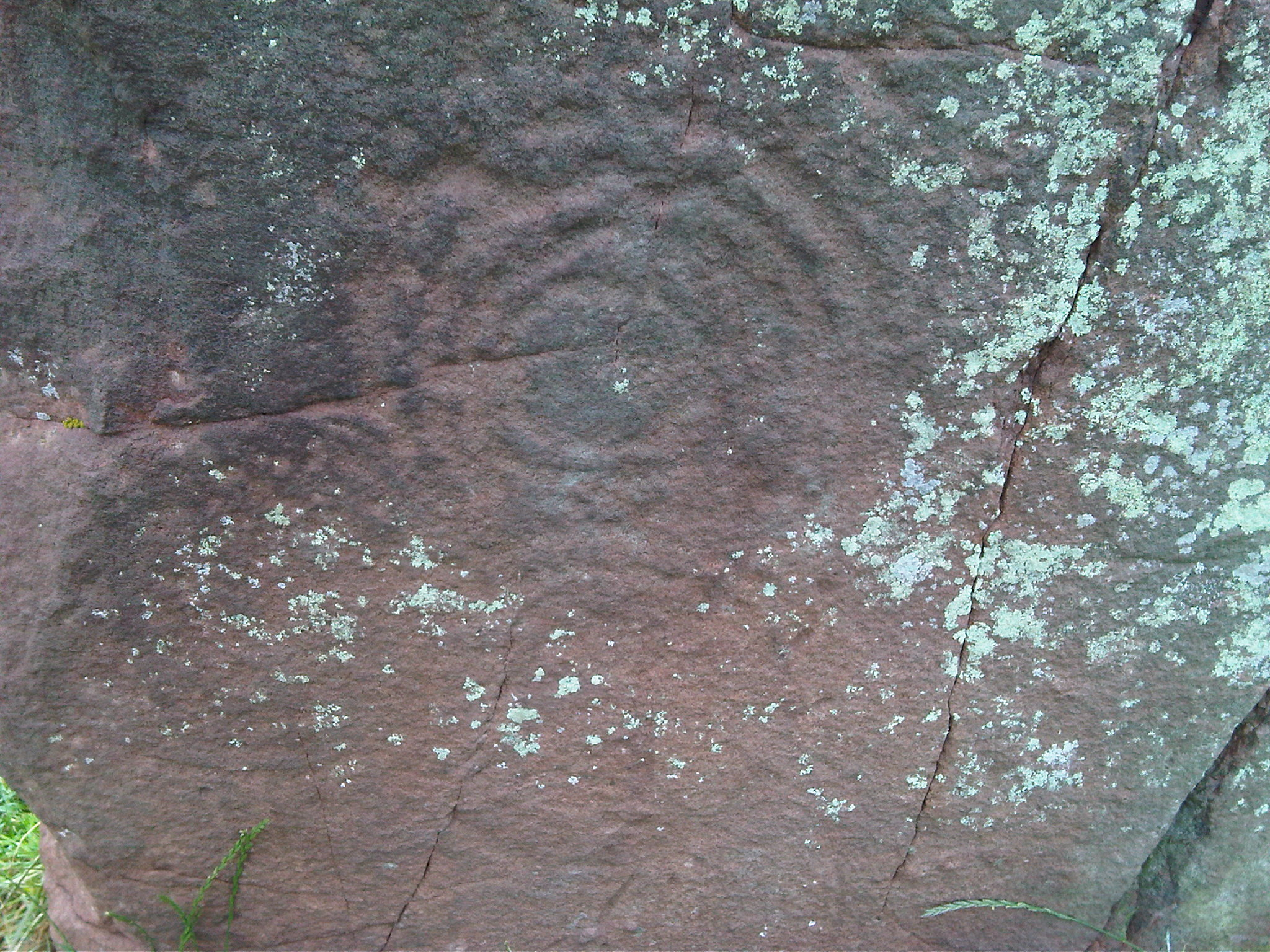
One of three cup and ring marks on the Long Meg stone

The Long Meg monolith has motifs on the face looking towards the circle arranged in three sections. The markings include: in the centre, a cup at the centre of three rings, a spiral of four turns and various concentric arcs; in the lower section, three faint figures at the left-hand corner, an anti-clockwise spiral, cup and ring and various concentric arcs; in the upper section are faint rings, ovoids, spirals and other markings. Some of the stones in the circle itself have artificial markings on them as well.

== Dating and purpose ==
The large ditched enclosure lying immediately to the north of the circle is probably Early Neolithic (c. 3800 - 3200 BC). In this respect, it may be of the same date as other enclosures found in Cumbria that include: Carrock Fell, Skelmore Heads, Howe Robin, and Green How. If the stone circle is later than the enclosure, it is likely to be either late Neolithic, or early Bronze Age. As it has a very similar form to Swinside, another stone circle in Cumbria, it likely shares the same dating. There is the possibility that the Long Meg monolith was not contemporary with the stone circle.

Long Meg appears to have been more than a burial place. However, the exact nature of the purpose of the monument is still a matter of conjecture. Clare summarises the various arguments concerning types, purpose, construction, size, layout, origins and dates, of Cumbrian stone circles and other monuments. His conclusion seems to be that the nature of the monument, and others like it (such as at Swinside), suggests that they are "places where people came together, probably at certain times of the year. Amongst activities at such times, we might envisage ritual, social exchange and trade." The "certain times of the year" mentioned here would probably have been calculated using the suggested predictive calendar as outlined by Hood. The actual building of the circle, perhaps taking place in stages over time, might in itself have been one of the purposes of the monument.

== Folklore and popular culture ==
The most famous of the many legends that surround the stones is that they were once a coven of witches who were turned to stone by a wizard from Scotland named Michael Scot. It is said the stones cannot be counted – but, if anyone is able to count them twice and come to the same total – the spell will be broken or it will bring very bad luck. Another legend states that if you walk round the circles and count the number of stones correctly, then put your ear to Long Meg, you will hear her whisper. The name itself is said to come from a local witch, Meg of Meldon, who was alive in the early 17th century. From a certain angle, the Long Meg stone resembles the profile of a witch, facing the stones. Note however that Meg of Meldon is the name given to Margaret Fenwick (née Selsby) who lived at Meldon near Morpeth, Northumberland, some 70 miles from these stones. Long animal bones found buried at the site may have been misinterpreted in the past as a 'Giant's bone and body'.

Long Meg and Her Daughters was a filming location for the 2012 film Sightseers.

Long Meg and Her Daughters featured in the Opera Kings, Witches, Lovers, and Souls, a 2024 opera about Cumbrian folktales, premiered by the Cumbria Opera Group. The stone circle also plays an important role in Sarah Hall's 2025 novel, Helm.
