= Eamont Bridge (structure) =

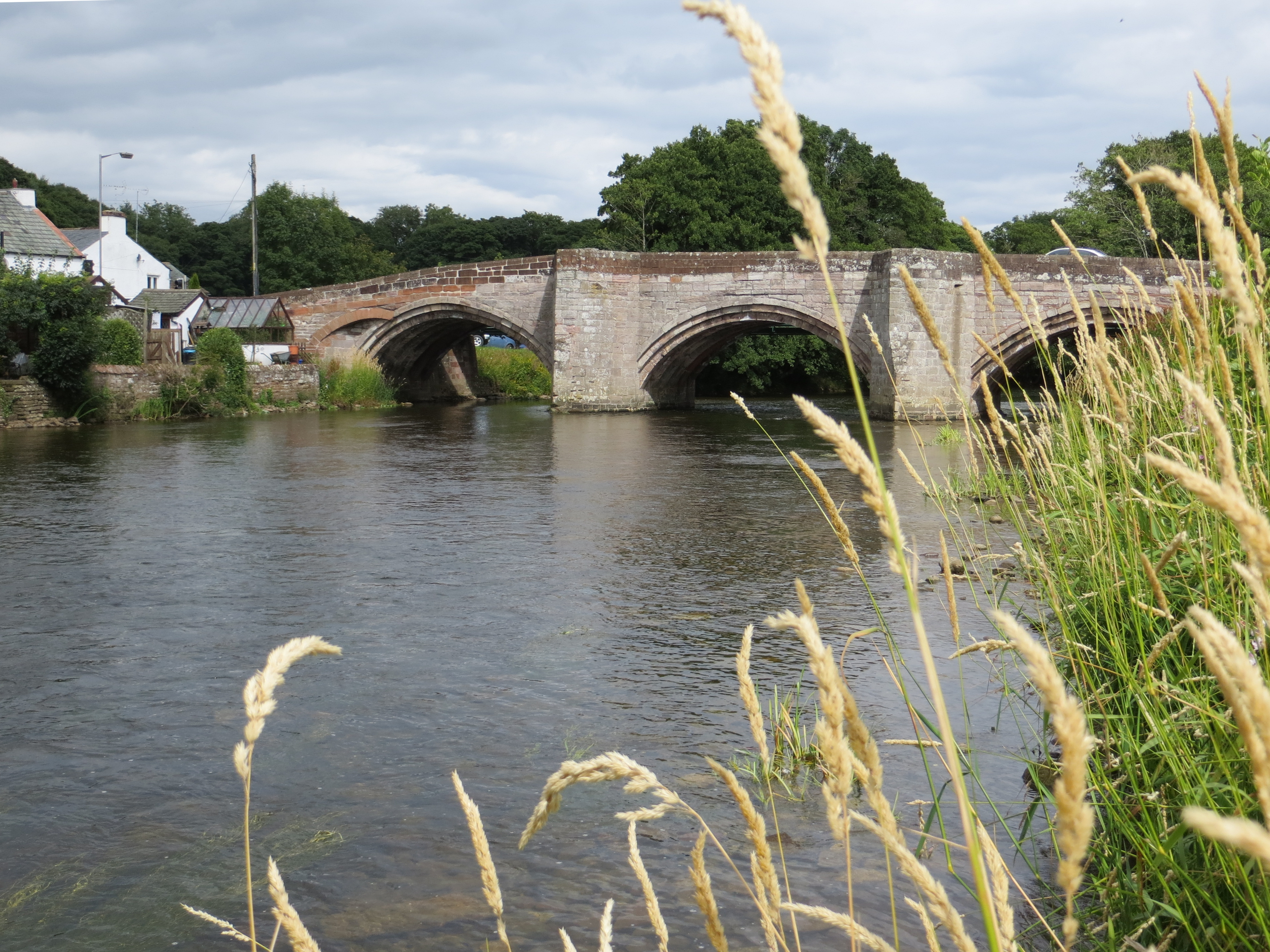
- The bridge in August 2013
- Coordinates: 54.651520°N 2.742000°W
- Carries: A6 road
- Crosses: River Eamont
- Locale: Penrith, Cumbria, England
- Heritage status

Scheduled monument
- Designated: 5 July 1926
- Reference no.: 1007193

Listed Building – Grade I
- Designated: 24 April 1951; 6 February 1968
- Reference no.: 1145133; 1145301

Characteristics
- Material: Grey sandstone; Red sandstone (alterations)
- No. of spans: 3

History
- Construction start: 15th century
- Closed: December 2015

Location
- Interactive map of Eamont Bridge

Eamont Bridge is a road bridge over the River Eamont, at the village of the same name, immediately to the south of Penrith, Cumbria, England. It is a scheduled monument and a Grade I listed building (it has two listings as it spans a parish boundary and is listed under both).

The narrow bridge lies on the A6 road, and until the opening of the M6 motorway, it was a notorious bottleneck. It is still controlled by traffic lights.

The bridge crosses the old county boundary between Cumberland and Westmorland and is one of the oldest bridges in the county still in daily use. It was built in 1425 after the Bishop of Durham, Thomas Langley, offered indulgences to anyone contributing towards its construction, and it was widened in 1875. It is a slightly humpbacked three-arched bridge made of grey sandstone with alterations in red sandstone. The solid parapets include pedestrian refuges above the pillars. Like the village, the bridge stands partly in Yanwath and Eamont Bridge parish and partly in Penrith.

In December 2015, the bridge was declared unsafe and closed to traffic, following severe flooding caused by Storm Frank. The bridge sustained significant damage, with a one-metre hole reported in a supporting pillar. It was repaired and reopened in March 2016.

== See also ==
- Grade I listed buildings in Cumbria
- Listed buildings in Penrith, Cumbria
- Listed buildings in Yanwath and Eamont Bridge
