= Little Meg =

Archaeological site in Cumbria, England

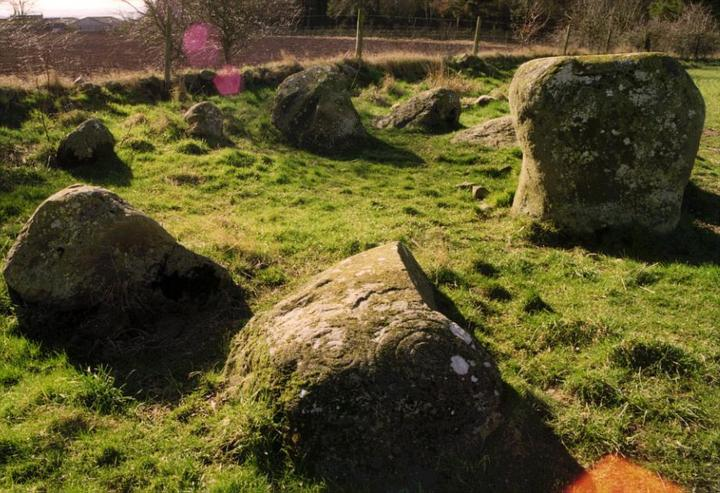
- The Little Meg circle with the decorated stone in the foreground

- Location within Cumbria
- 54°43′50″N 2°39′30″W
- Type: Kerb cairn
- Periods: Bronze Age
- Location: Little Salkeld
- OS grid reference: NY57693749

Little Meg (also known as the Maughanby circle) is a small circle of large kerb stones which probably surrounded a Bronze Age kerb cairn. It is close to the village of Langwathby to the north-east of Penrith in the English county of Cumbria and is 650 metres north-east of the more famous stone circle of Long Meg and Her Daughters. It forms part of a complex of stone circles and cairns around the Long Meg site that includes the circle at Glassonby, Old Parks, and other sites since lost.

Two of the stones (only one remaining) were decorated in antiquity with a series of concentric circles and a spiral.

== Location ==
Little Meg is situated c.650m north-east of the Long Meg stone circle (grid reference NY57693749). "It stands on a very slight ridge amongst gently undulating glacial deposits". Long Meg would have been visible at the time of its use.

The stone circles, henges, cairns and other standing stones in the area are often grouped close to water (springs, rivers). The Shap Stone Avenue to the south of Penrith, forms an 'avenue' running to the east of the River Lowther along a main route to the north; the Long Meg complex runs alongside the River Eden; Mayburgh and the other henges run alongside the River Eamont near its confluence with the River Lowther.

Among the many questions related to this site, one concerns why Little Meg was not aligned with the midwinter or midsummer line to Long Meg. Clare suggests that maybe that line was considered too 'sacred', or that the existing vegetation precluded seeing the line, or that there was already another monument there.

== Construction ==
Other questions concern the nature of the construction of Little Meg. When first discovered in the middle of the nineteenth century, there was a c.1.3m mound covering the stones. The number of stones was reported to be 8 by one person, 11 by another, perhaps because the mound was not completely cleared away and still covered three stones. Bones, charcoal and a 'coarse pot' were found buried in a cist at the centre of the circle, the pot being unadorned and standing at the east end of the cist.

Whether the stones were standing or lying down is also another question. It is possible that some stones were pushed over prior to the building of the mound.

Given an 11-stone circle, about 18 feet in diameter, it might be that the internal cairn was part of the original structure.

== Rock art ==
There is one boulder existing today that has a spiral on it linked into multiple concentric circles. The crispness of the cutting may suggest that the work was done shortly before the mound was made, thus preserving the artwork. There was another stone at the west side of the circle, no longer extant, that had an incised circle and other markings on it.

Two stones found in the cist (now in Penrith Museum), have cup and ring markings. Their use in the cist is uncertain - they may have supported a cap stone. The markings on the cist stone are cup-centred, whereas the ones on the ring-stones are on a plain background, suggesting that the cist itself was a later addition.

== Dating and purpose ==
Although Little Meg looks like a small stone circle or oval, it is more likely to be a Bronze Age (c.2,500 - c.700 B.C.) kerb cairn. Another cairn was reported 100 yards to the east of Little Meg by the original recorder of Little Meg itself, Canon Simpson.
