= Yanwath =

Village in Cumbria, England

Coordinates: 54.6425°N 2.7579°W

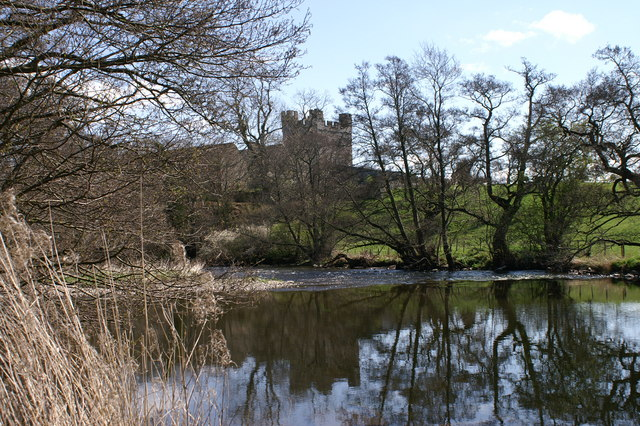
- Yanwath Hall

- Location within Cumbria
- OS grid reference: NY5127
- Civil parish: Yanwath and Eamont Bridge
- Unitary authority: Westmorland and Furness
- Ceremonial county: Cumbria
- Region: North West
- Country: England
- Sovereign state: United Kingdom
- Post town: PENRITH
- Postcode district: CA10
- Dialling code: 01768
- Police: Cumbria
- Fire: Cumbria
- Ambulance: North West
- UK Parliament: Westmorland and Lonsdale

Yanwath is a village in the Westmorland and Furness district of Cumbria, England, 1 mile south of Penrith.

There is a primary school at Yanwath, with 192 pupils.

Yanwath Gate Inn, in the centre of the village, dates from the 17th century. It is a Grade II listed building.

Half a mile north-west of the village, Yanwath Hall is a fortified tower house. Its oldest parts were built in the late 14th century. It is a Grade I listed building.

== The navvy riots ==
The West Coast Main Line runs near Yanwath. During the construction of the line, in January 1846, a riot broke out after a drunken English ganger (a railway construction foreman) offended an Irish navvy working on the line. The English and Irish navvies were segregated as was usual; the Irish were staying near Plumpton and the English were staying near the Pele tower at Yanwath. The Irish navvy's fellow countrymen sided with him and the ganger called on the rest of the English to run the Irish off the works.

After dark the next day, a battalion of aggrieved Irishmen marched on Yanwath. However the English were warned of the mob, so left the village to the Irish who, upon finding the English absent, left it unlooted and unrazed. Next morning English recruits came from Kendal and Shap and between them looted and gutted the Irish settlement at Plumpton. In the process they killed an Irishman.

The event then descended into a bitter and violent week-long riot involving the contingent of Irish navvies, the Westmorland Yeomanry and the 89th Foot (later, the Royal Irish Fusiliers).

== Railway explosion ==
A disastrous explosion occurred only 21 years after the railway line's opening, in 1867.

On the night of 26 February that year a goods train, running late from Tebay, derailed. One of its wagons, carrying two tons of gunpowder, ended up on the opposite track, and moments later, another goods train collided with the gunpowder wagon and caused an explosion.

Both the driver and fireman of the latter goods train died. The explosion blew out windows, felled telegraph wires, and caused debris to rain down on Yanwath. Miraculously, there were no further deaths or injuries.

== Toponymy ==
The name Yanwath is a contraction of the older name 'Yamonwath'. The suffix '-wath' is of Old Norse origin, meaning 'ford'; thus Yamonwath means ford in the River Eamont ('Yamon' in Cumbrian dialect).
