= Listed buildings in Yanwath and Eamont Bridge =

Yanwath and Eamont Bridge is a civil parish in Westmorland and Furness, Cumbria, England. It contains 15 listed buildings that are recorded in the National Heritage List for England. Of these, three are listed at Grade I, the highest of the three grades, one is at Grade II*, the middle grade, and the others are at Grade II, the lowest grade. The parish contains the villages of Yanwath and Eamont Bridge, and the surrounding countryside. The listed buildings consist of a tower house and associated structures, a road bridge, which is also a scheduled monument, a railway viaduct, houses and associated structures, a hotel, a public house, a farmhouse and farm buildings.

== Key ==
Grade	Criteria
I	Buildings of exceptional interest, sometimes considered to be internationally important
II*	Particularly important buildings of more than special interest
II	Buildings of national importance and special interest

== Buildings ==
Name and location	Photograph	Date	Notes	Grade
Yanwath Hall; 54.64621°N 2.76415°W		Late 14th century	A tower house, the oldest part being the tower, with later alterations and additions, including a hall. The building is in sandstone, the tower is on a chamfered plinth, and has a band, three storeys, and an embattled parapet with turrets at the corners. It contains a mullioned and transomed window with a chamfered surround in the ground floor and a smaller window above. The hall to the right has a roof of sandstone slate, two storeys and five bays. The doorway has a segmental head, and the windows vary; some are mullioned and transomed, some have ogee heads, there is a 20th-century casement window, and above some are hood moulds.	I
Courtyard range, Yanwath Hall; 54.64644°N 2.76433°W	—	15th century	The farm buildings were extended and altered in the 16th and 19th centuries, and form two sides of a courtyard. They are in sandstone with roofs partly of green slate and partly of sandstone slate; they are partly battlemented and incorporate a watch tower. The east range has three bays, and links to the hall, and the north range has two storeys and seven bays. The buildings contain archways, doorways, windows, and external steps leading to loft doorways.	I
Eamont Bridge; 54.65158°N 2.74201°W		15th century (probable)	The bridge carries the A6 road over the River Eamont, and was widened in 1875. It is in sandstone, and consists of a slightly humped bridge with three segmental arches. There are two cutwaters rising to form pedestrian refuges with solid parapets. The bridge is also a Scheduled Monument.	I
Bridge End; 54.65109°N 2.74194°W	—	1671	The house was altered in 1751, and a rear extension was added in the 19th century. It is roughcast, and has a Welsh slate roof, two storeys, and three bays. The central doorway has a dated and inscribed lintel, above it is an inscribed and dated panel, and the windows have chamfered stone surrounds.	II
The Gate Inn; 54.64277°N 2.75832°W	—	1683	Originally two houses, the later one dating probably from the early 18th century, subsequently converted into a public house. It is roughcast with Welsh slate roofs and two storeys, the right part being higher. Both parts have two bays, and at the rear are an outshut and a single-storey single-bay extension. In the ground floor of the left part are sash windows in stone surrounds, and in the upper floor the windows are casements in chamfered surrounds. Most of the windows in the right part are sashes, with one mullioned window.	II
Mansion House; 54.65019°N 2.74066°W		1686	Originally a house, later offices, it is rendered on a chamfered plinth, with quoins, an eaves cornice, sandstone dressings, and a green slate roof. There are two storeys and an attic, and a symmetrical front of five bays. In the centre is a projecting enclosed porch with quoins, a balustraded balcony, and a doorway with an architrave and an initialled and dated lintel. Above the porch is a cross-mullioned window in a bolection architrave with a frieze and a swan-neck pediment on scrolled brackets. The windows are mullioned in architraves with cornices.	II*
Yanwath Woodhouse; 54.63011°N 2.73774°W	—	1697	A farmhouse that was altered in the 19th century, it is roughcast with quoins, and a green slate roof. There are two storeys and three bays. The central doorway has an architrave, above it is a coat of arms, and the windows are sashes in stone architraves.	II
Crown Hotel; 54.64884°N 2.74010°W		1770	Originally a public house and a private house, later joined to form a hotel. The building is rendered on a chamfered plinth, with two storeys and green slate roofs. The former public house to the left has seven bays, a doorway with a rusticated surround, and three canted bay windows, one with two storeys. The former house has rusticated quoins and three bays. The two parts are joined by a single-bay recessed link. All the windows are sashes.	II
The Cottage; 54.64427°N 2.76064°W	—	Late 18th century	A rendered house with a slate roof, two storeys and three bays. In the centre is a doorway with a chamfered surround and a pointed head, and above it is a window with a pointed head. The other windows on the front are mullioned with flat heads. There are more windows with pointed heads on the left return and at the rear.	II
Barn north of The Cottage; 54.64449°N 2.76070°W	—	1804	The barn is in pink sandstone with red sandstone dressings, and has a green slate roof. There are two storeys and three bays. It contains a large segmental-arched cart entrance, doors in stone surrounds, square vents, and external steps leading to a loft door.	II
Barns, Yanwath Hall; 54.64662°N 2.76380°W	—	Early 19th century	The two barns, at right angles, are in sandstone with quoins, and green slate roofs, partly hipped. The north barn has two storeys and four bays, and contains four segmental-headed doorways, one converted into a casement window, and a central segmental-arched loft doorway flanked by ventilation slits. The east barn has seven bays, three segmental-headed doorways converted into casement windows flanked by flat-headed doorways.	II
Hugh's Crag Viaduct; 54.63630°N 2.73771°W	—	1846	The viaduct was built by the Lancaster and Carlisle Railway, and designed by Joseph Locke to carry the railway over the valley of the River Lowther. It is in red sandstone, and consists of five segmental arches.	II
Lowther Lodge; 54.64636°N 2.73862°W		1877	The lodge is at the entrance to the drive of Lowther Castle. It is in pink sandstone and calciferous sandstone, with string courses, a battlemented parapet, and a slate roof, partly hipped. There are two storeys and three bays. On the front facing the drive is a projecting open battlemented porch, and on the front facing the road is an octagonal turret. The windows have two or three lights, there are loops, and on the front is a coat of arms.	II
Walls, piers and railings, Lowther Lodge; 54.64637°N 2.73880°W	—	1877	The walls and piers are in calciferous sandstone. The walls are in an L-shape on a chamfered plinth, they have moulded copings, and carry patterned cast iron railings. The piers flanking the main gate, the pedestrian gate, and the entrance to a track are hexagonal, the gate piers have shaped caps, and the piers at the entrance to the track have pyramidal caps.	II
Boer War Memorial; 54.64854°N 2.73983°W		1901	The memorial was erected to commemorate two local men who were killed in the Boer War. It stands in the corner of a field at a road junction, and is in Westmorland green stone. The memorial consists of a Celtic Cross on a rectangular pedestal standing on a base of two square steps. The front of the cross face and the upper part of the shaft have carved decorations, and on the lower part of the shaft are portraits of the two men in bronze medallions. There are inscriptions on the front of the pedestal and the base, and on the side of the pedestal are the names of three men lost in the Second World War.	II
