= Mayburgh Henge =

Neolithic henge in Cumbria, England

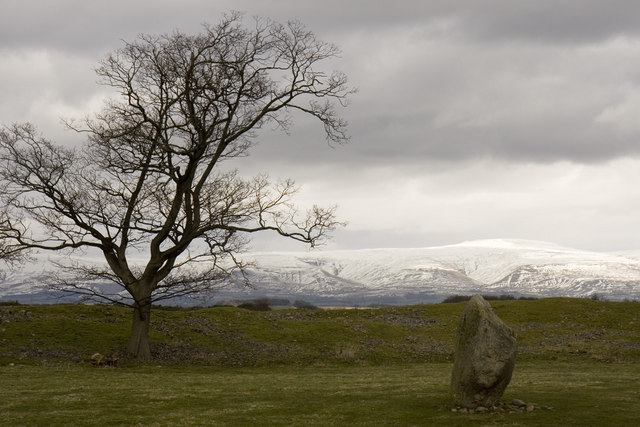
- Mayburgh Henge, interior

- Location within Cumbria
- 54°38′56″N 2°44′48″W
- Type: Henge
- Periods: Neolithic / Bronze Age
- Location: Eamont Bridge
- OS grid reference: NY51922845

Site notes
- Owner: English Heritage
- Public access: Yes

Mayburgh Henge is a large prehistoric monument in the county of Cumbria in northern England. The henge is in the care of English Heritage and is a Scheduled Ancient Monument. It is 400 metres (0.25 mi) from King Arthur's Round Table Henge.

== Location ==
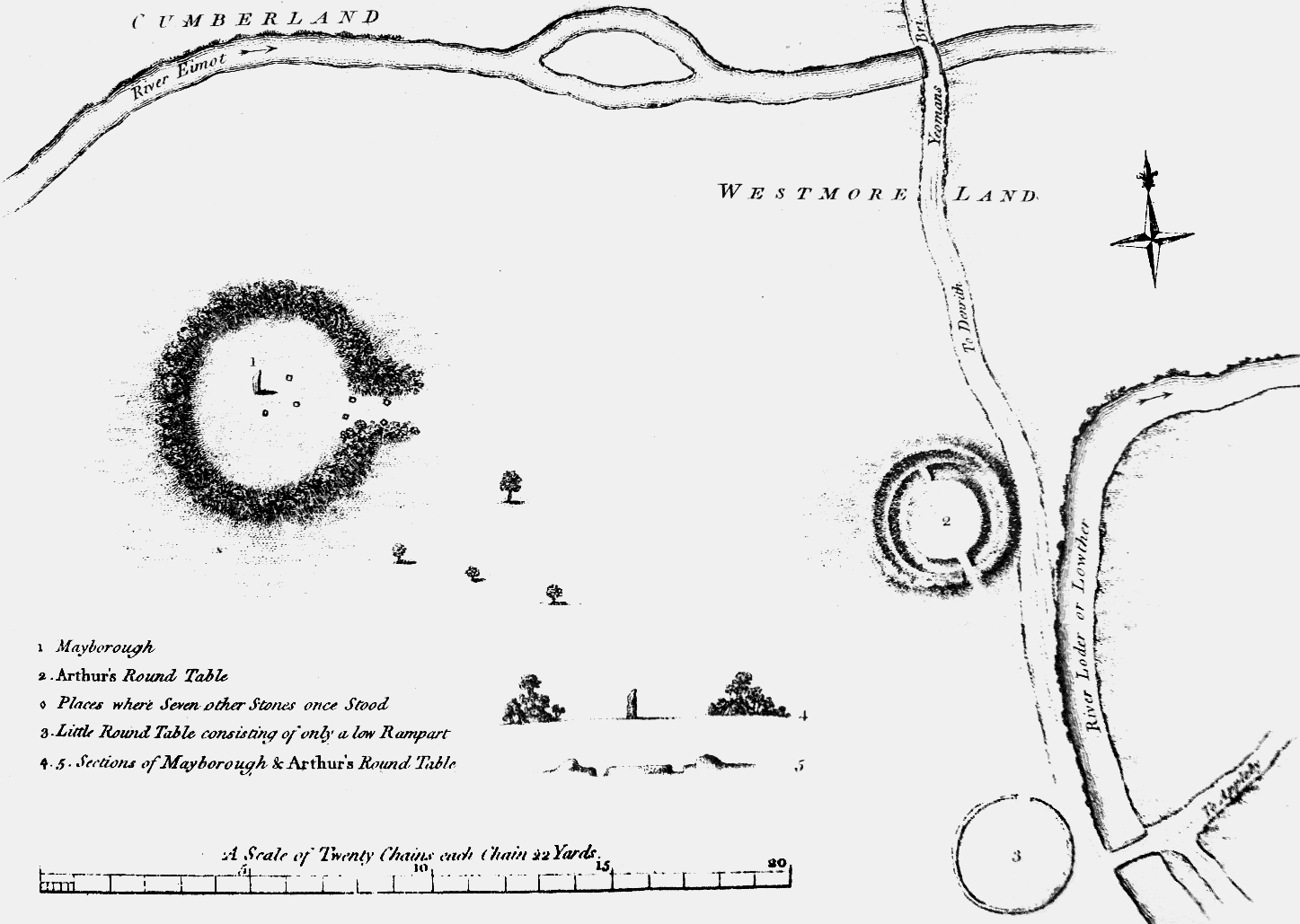
Mayburgh and King Arthur's Round Tables, 1769

The Ordnance Survey grid reference for Mayburgh Henge is NY51922845. The henge is situated on a knoll just outside the village of Eamont Bridge close to the confluence of the Rivers Eamont and Lowther around 1 mile south of Penrith, just a few hundred yards from the M6 motorway.

The henge sites are "to be seen as components in a landscape dominated by steep sided valleys and fast flowing streams...focused on a spring which lay between Mayburgh and King Arthur's Round Table, and which connected them to the River Eamont...on the other side of the Eamont are two less well known burial mounds." (The presence of the spring was noted by William Stukeley.)

The main communication routes of the time – "from Shap, from the Upper Eden, and down the Petteril valley to Carlisle and the Solway all converge at Eamont Bridge, which, as the name implies, is a natural and historic crossing point for the two rivers." The stone circles, henges, cairns and other standing stones in the area are often grouped at nodes of communication routes. The Shap Stone Avenue to the south of Penrith, (including the Goggleby Stone, the Thunder Stone, Skellaw Hill, as well as Oddendale to the east), forms an 'avenue' running to the east of the River Lowther along a main route to the north; the Long Meg complex runs alongside the River Eden; Mayburgh and the other henges run alongside the River Eamont near its confluence with the River Lowther.

== Construction ==
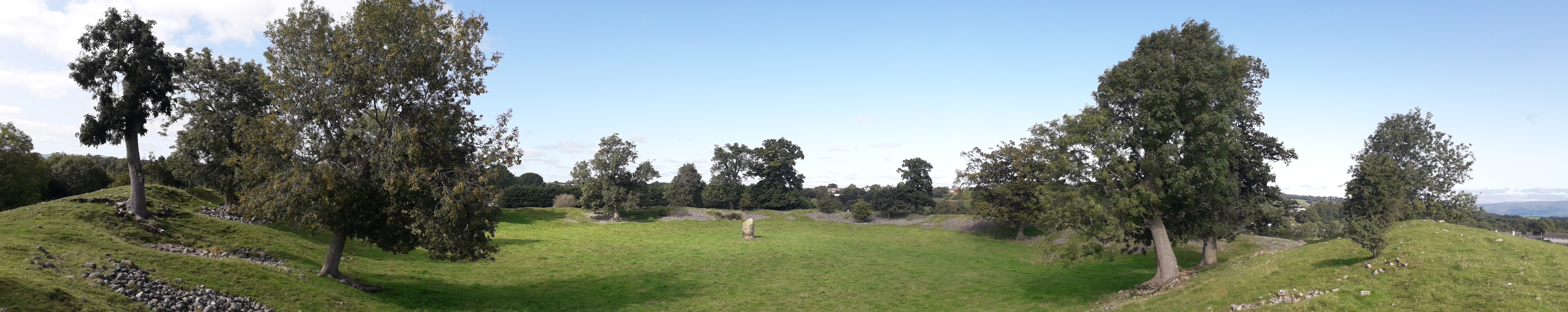
Panorama of the henge showing large circular bank and the centre stone

The site consists of a single circular bank possibly built using cobble stones from the rivers "unlike other henge monuments, where earth from the digging of a ditch is piled up to form a bank." There is no evidence of a ditch at Mayburgh. Clare estimates that the bank contains c20,000 tons of stones (despite many being taken away over the years for other uses), and also points to an alternative theory that suggests that the "bank may have been formed by excavation and re-arrangement of a glacial mound."

The bank is up to 15 feet (4.6 metres) high, and 50 metres across its base with a diameter of around 383 feet (117 metres). Contained within it is a single monolith 9 feet (2.7 metres) high. According to Thomas Pennant, in the early 18th century there had been four standing stones in the centre (marked on his 1769 plan, shown here), and a further four at the entrance, (plus a possible 'outer circle'), but his contemporary Robert Hutchinson, writing in 1773, gave a slightly different version:

"The inhabitants in the neighbourhood say, that within the memory of man, two other stones of similar nature, and placed in a kind of angular figure with the stone now remaining, were to be seen there, but as they were hurtful to the ground, were destroyed and removed."

Clare notes that the centre is slightly domed and raises the possibility that the original site may have been a stone circle (destroyed) with four portal stones, with the bank being added later.

The entrance is due east of the centre of the henge, and frames the rising of the equinoctial sun, which "suggests that the monument may reflect the cardinal points, as do the Long Meg and Castlerigg stone circles." The eastward-looking entrance also points to just north of King Arthur's Round Table and the only view obtainable from the interior of the monument is towards the ridge top of Blencathra where the equinoctial sun sets.

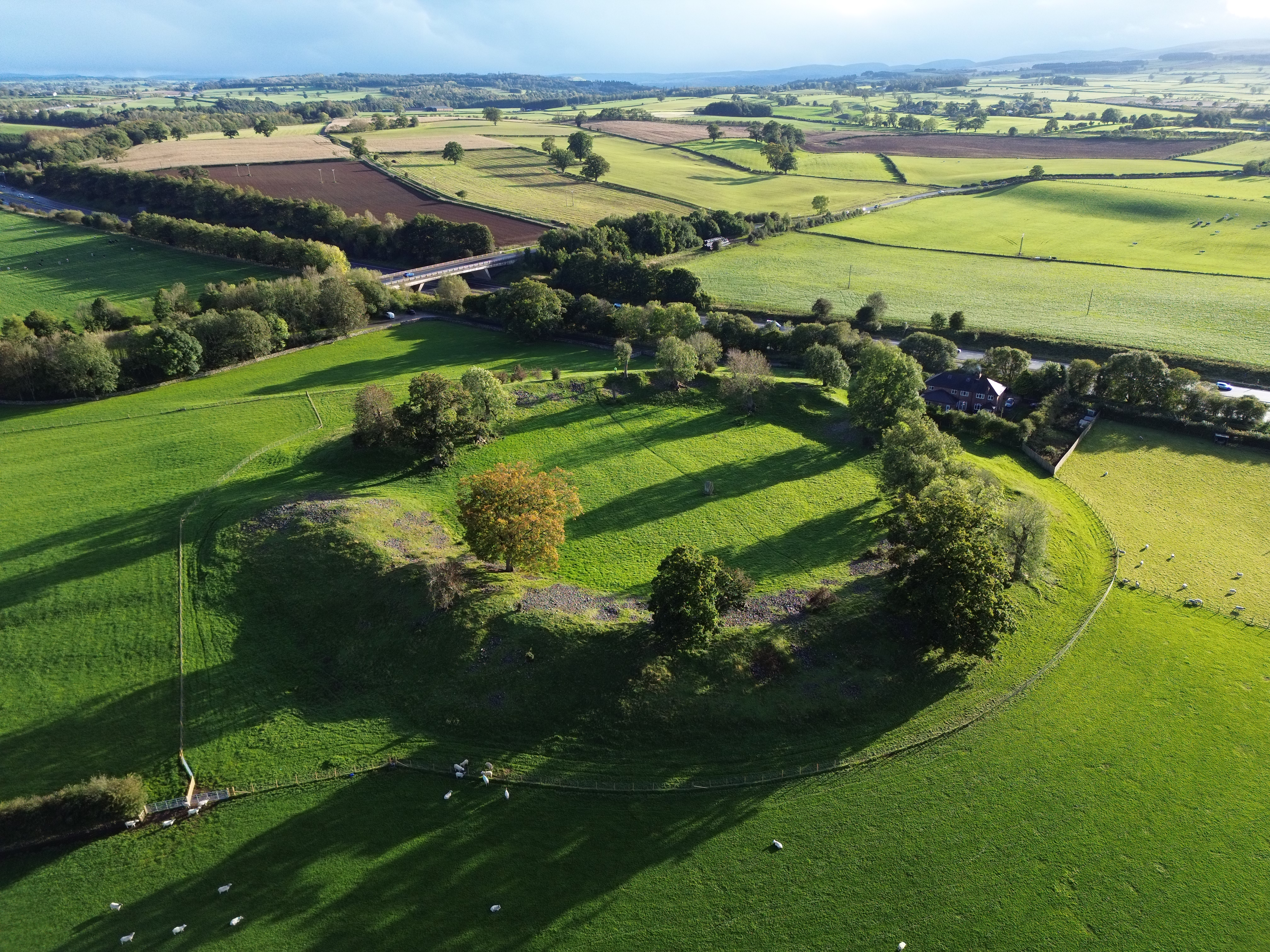
The M6 runs directly past Mayburgh Henge

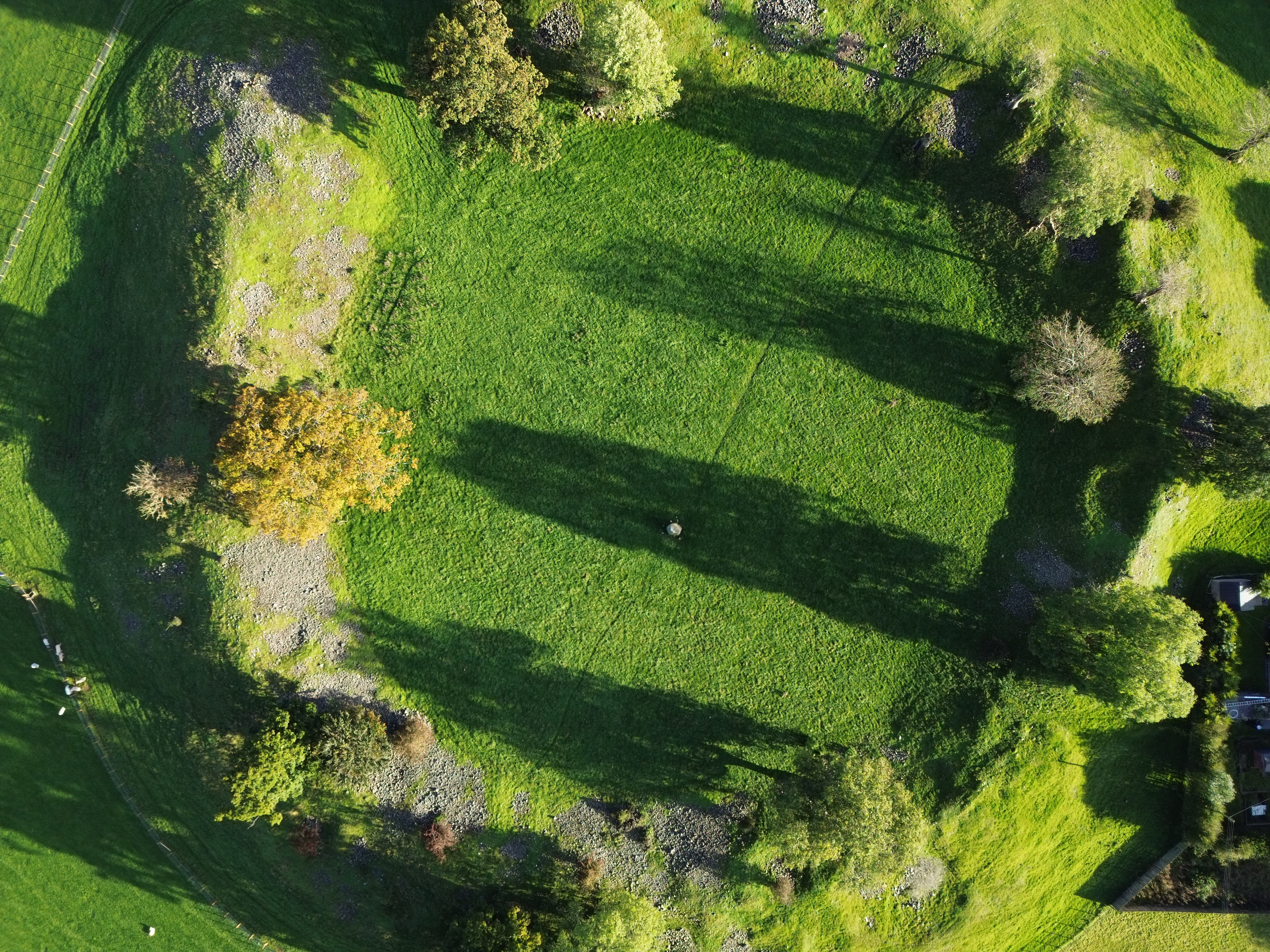
Mayburgh Henge from directly above

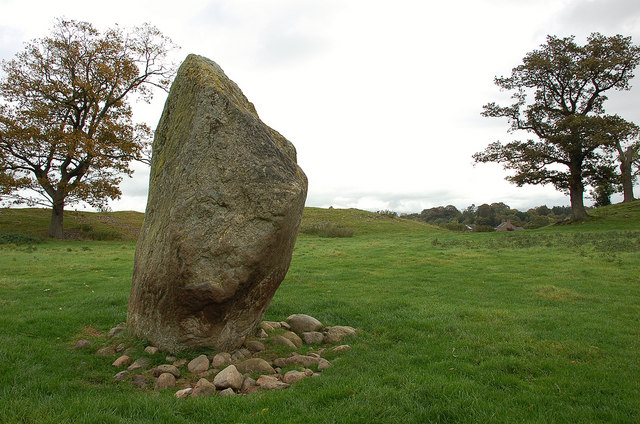
Central standing stone

== Dating and purpose ==
No proper excavation has been done at Mayburgh, so it is difficult to date the henge with any certainty, but the presence of Neolithic and Bronze axes found near the site indicate a date in the Neolithic or Bronze Age. In 1992 a magnetometer survey was carried out by Geophysical Surveys of Bradford and English Heritage to confirm any stone settings within the interior and to assess the presence of a ditch, internal or external.

There is no obvious explanation for why Mayburgh was built, but the fact that it is close to the confluence of the rivers Lowther and Eamont have given rise to the theory that it was once a trade centre on a route for stone axe trade from the Neolithic axe factory at Langdale.

The proximity to a river and spring (as with other monuments of this age) also suggests ritualistic uses - an association between water and funerary monuments as at Durrington Walls and Stonehenge is possible. Its proximity to a spring may be to do with birth of life and human life-cycle rituals. The use of significantly-coloured stones (pink, blue/gray local stones and white quartz rock) would have made "the visual impact...awe inspiring...The use of this combination of coloured stones relates to the deliberate symbolic incorporation of the Neolithic worlds of the living and the dead through solar and lunar rituals that incorporate water." (The same combination of red, black/blue and white occurs at Long Meg and Oddendale, as well as at other henges such as those at the Thornborough Henges in North Yorkshire which were covered in gypsum).

Mayburgh's alignment to the equinox sun also suggests a cosmological use similar to that of Long Meg.

== Other monuments ==
The Henge forms part of a selection of prehistoric and historic remains in the surrounding area, including:

- King Arthur's Round Table Henge (KART), 400 metres from Mayburgh Henge.
- Little Round Table (75 metres to the South of KART, but no longer visible).

(These, together with Mayburgh Henge, are known as the "Penrith Henges").

Other pre-historic complexes:

- Shap Stone Avenue, 10 miles to the south of Penrith
- Long Meg and Her Daughters, 6 miles northeast of Penrith

Later monuments:

- Brocavum Roman Camp, Brougham
- Brougham Castle
- Shap Abbey, near Shap

Eden Arts Council erected a 50 tonne granite obelisk nearby, called the "Millennium Stone", to mark the year 2000.
