= Shap Stone Avenue =

Neolithic stone complex in Cumbria, England

Shap Avenue
- Shap Stone Avenue
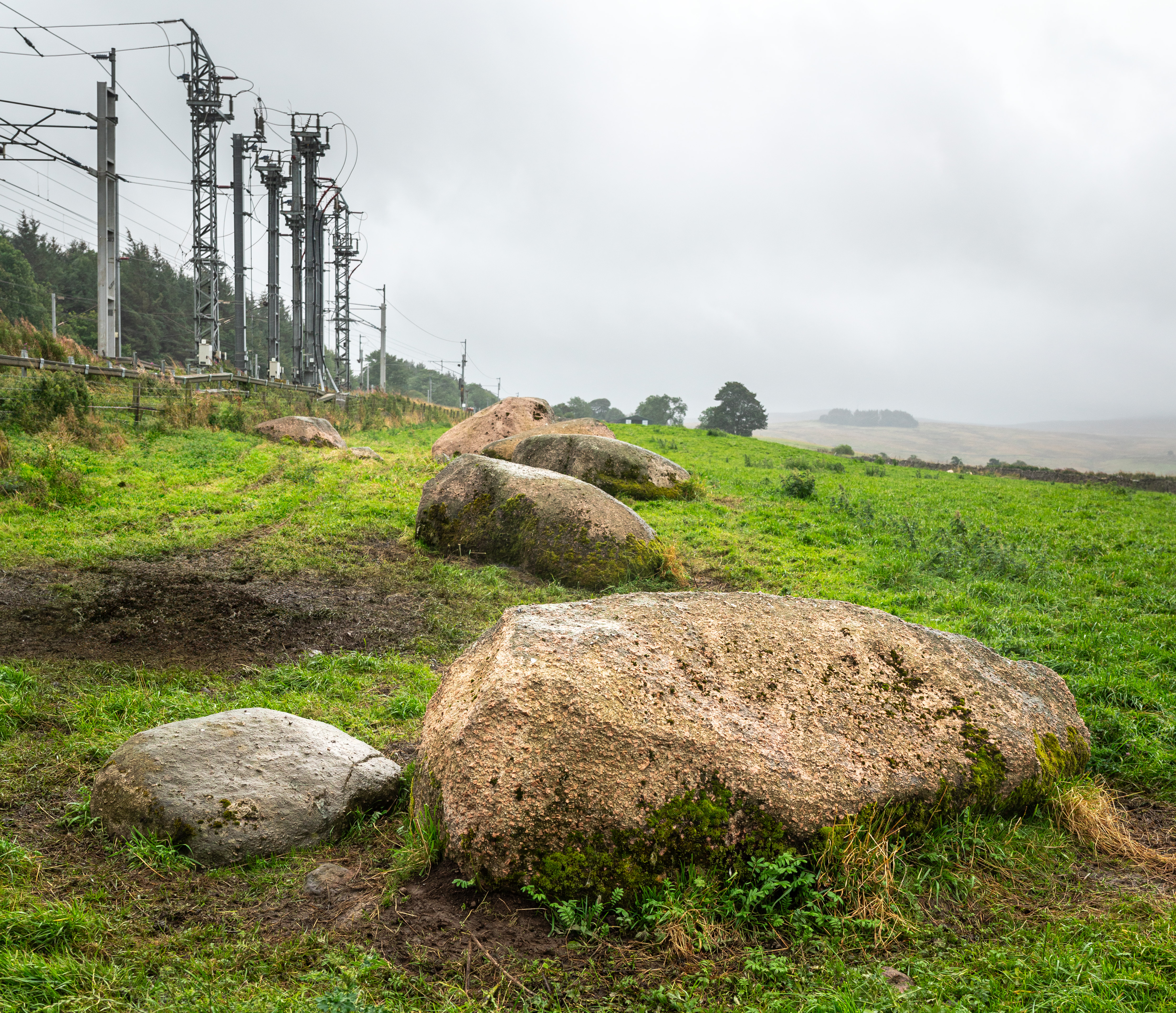
- Kemp Howe Stone Circle, the best surviving element of the avenue complex

- Location in England
- 54.5131°N 2.6688°W
- Type: Stone avenue and stone circle
- Periods: Late Neolithic to Early Bronze Age
- Location: Shap, Cumbria, England, United Kingdom
- Region: Eden Valley
- Part of: Eden Valley megalithic complex

History
- Built: c. 2850 BCE

Site notes
- Material: Pink granite boulders and glacial erratics
- Length: 3.2 km (2.0 mi) (original extent)
- Excavation dates: Limited investigation; landscape archaeology surveys
- Archaeologists: Tom Clare
- Condition: Largely destroyed; several stones and the Kemp Howe circle survive
- Owner: Mostly private farmland
- Public access: Limited

Shap Avenue is the name given to a, now mostly destroyed, megalithic complex near the village of Shap in Cumbria, England, comprising at least two stone circles, a two-mile avenue of megalithic standing stones, and several adjacent burial mounds. Before its destruction, it was one of the largest megalithic monuments in Europe. As it survives today, the site comprises a rough and highly damaged avenue of stones arranged over a mile, aligned northwest. At its southern end is the avenue's terminal, a stone circle named 'Kemp Howe', which has been mostly buried by a rail embankment.

Up until the 18th century, Shap Avenue was comparable to Avebury in Wiltshire, making it a popular tourist destination for antiquarians. William Stukeley, famous for his work at Avebury, visited the site before its destruction, sometime before 1725. He said of Shap Avenue:

“Though it's ourney be northward ... it makes a very large curve, or an arc of a circle, as those at Avebury, and passes over a brook too. A spring likewise arises in it, near the Greyhound inn.”

Stukeley had earlier received a plan of the monument from a local antiquarian (now missing). Of this, he notes:

"I have gott a vast drawing and measurement from Mr. Routh, of Carlisle, of the stones at Shap, in Westmoreland, which I desired from him. They give me so much satisfaction that verily I shall call on you next year to take another religions pilgrimage' with me thither. I find it to be, what I always supposed, another huge serpentine temple, like that of ABVRY. The measure of what are left extends a mile and a half, but without doubt a great deal of it has been demolished by the town, and by everything else thereabouts..."

== Name and etymology ==
The modern place-name Shap derives from earlier recorded forms including Hepe and Hep, which appear in medieval documents referring to the settlement and surrounding landscape. These forms are generally understood to originate from an Old English word meaning "heap" or "pile", often used in place-names to describe cairns or conspicuous accumulations of stone.

Such terminology is consistent with the prehistoric character of the area. The Eden Valley contains a dense concentration of Neolithic and Bronze Age stone monuments, including stone circles, burial cairns, and standing stones, many constructed from locally sourced glacial erratics and distinctive pink granite boulders. Archaeologists have suggested that place-names referring to stone heaps or cairns may preserve later linguistic memories of these prominent prehistoric features in the landscape.

Early antiquarian writers were already aware of the unusual concentration of megalithic stones around Shap. In the sixteenth century, the antiquarian William Camden described large pyramidal stones arranged in rows extending for nearly a mile near the settlement, though he was unable to determine their purpose. By the eighteenth century, antiquarians such as William Stukeley were comparing the monument complex with the great megalithic landscapes of southern Britain, including Avebury.

Today the term Shap Avenue is used by archaeologists to describe the surviving elements of this prehistoric complex, including the long alignment of stones extending northwest from the stone circle at Kemp Howe, together with associated burial cairns and other megalithic features across the surrounding landscape.

== Location ==
Shap Stone Avenue sits near the centre of the Eden Valley, Cumbria. It is broadly grouped into a category of monuments dubbed by Aubrey Burl, as 'Cumbrian Circles': large, uncluttered enclosures of stone, large enough to congregate inside. Such enclosures are in areas surrounding the English Lake District, and have been dated amongst the oldest in the British Isles (as dated by the Lochmaben Stone).

It is one of three major complexes of megalithic monuments to be found in the Eden Valley. The stone circles, henges, cairns and other standing stones were likely grouped at key nodes along a possible major route north up to Scotland (today marked by the M6 motorway). The monuments around Shap form a northwest alignment with several monuments in the Eden Valley, all to the east of the River Lowther along this main route to the north. Firstly, Mayburgh Henge and the other henges within the Penrith henge complex, sit alongside the River Eamont, near its confluence with the River Lowther, 11 km north of Shap. Secondly, the Long Meg and Her Daughters complex runs alongside the River Eden, approximately 20 km north of Shap.

Archaeologist Tom Clare noted that the view to the east is restricted, that there may have been a tarn close to the site, and that the southern terminus of the lines of stones may have ended at a stream. There may also have been a spring within the complex (alluded to in the repeated place name 'Keld' in the area, Norse for 'spring'). All of these features are similar to ones found at the Long Meg and Penrith as well. Additionally, the landscape surrounding Shap is rich in Neolithic and Early Bronze Age archaeology. Of note, are the many burial cairns and ring cairns in the area. Notably, Moor Divock sits to the northwest, Gunnerkeld Stone Circle to the north, and Great Asby Scar to the south. There is also a multitude of stone circles and burial cairns to the east, such as the Hardendale Stone Cairn, Castle Howe, Seal Howe, and Oddendale.

== The avenue ==
The original avenue was said to comprise a large avenue of stones incorporating a massive stone circle at its centre known as 'Carl Lofts'. This was reported to be centred around the Greyhound Inn, near the southern end of Shap. At its ends were megalithic terminals (not unlike the Sanctuary at Avebury, which terminated West Kennet Avenue). A significant burial cairn, known as 'Skellaw Hill', is found at the avenue's northern end, though most stones have now been lost. Landscape archaeology can confirm the avenue, Skellaw Hill, and the terminals, but not Carl Lofts, which may have been misreported.

The OS grid reference of the Shap Avenue site can be given as NY5614, but the actual boundaries of the complex remain in doubt. Most stones have been lost, some natural erratics may have been added to the monument in historical times, and the various early accounts of the setting by William Stukeley, Thomas Pennant, Lady Lonsdale, and George Hall are not easy to reconcile. In many cases, it is not clear whether antiquarians visited the site prior to describing it. Instead, many appear to have parrotted the very earliest account of the avenue, in William Camden's Britannia, where the site took on the name 'Loder Stones', after the Lowther Family:

"Here the river Eimet, flowing out of a great Lake and for a good space dividing this shire from Cumberland, receiveth the river Loder into it, nere unto the spring head whereof, hard by Shape, in times past Hepe, a little monastery built by Thomas the sonne of Gospatrick, sonne of Orms, there is a well or fountaine which after the manner of Euripus ebbeth and floweth many times in a day; also there be huge stones in forme of Pyramides, some 9 foote high and foureteene foot thicke, ranged directly as it were in a rowe for a mile in length, with equall distance almost betweene, which may seeme to have bin pitched and erected for to continue the memoriall of some act there atchieved, but what the same was, by injurie of time it is quite forgotten."

However, a 1775 painting by Lady Mary Lowther is the best pictorial evidence archaeologists have of the site. The painting, currently in possession of Askham Hall (as of 2024), shows Kemp Howe, with a tightly arranged avenue of stones trailing off it towards the northwest. It appears to show the avenue crossing a stream, before disappearing into the distance towards the Greyhound Inn (still surviving today as a Grade II listed building).

Without Stukeley's plan of the site reemerging, the arrangement of the original stones north of the Greyhound Inn can no longer be determined (at least without excavation). Archaeologist Tom Clare suggested that there were two avenues. One consisting of a single, more widely spaced, row to the west and north west of Skellaw Hill, and an avenue leading from Kemp Howe to a now lost stone circle at Carl Lofts (reportedly situated near the Greyhound Hotel). Clare pointed out that the geological composition (pink granite) of the major, pyramidal-shaped stones (Goggleby Stone, Thunderstone) differs from that of the other boulders in the complex.

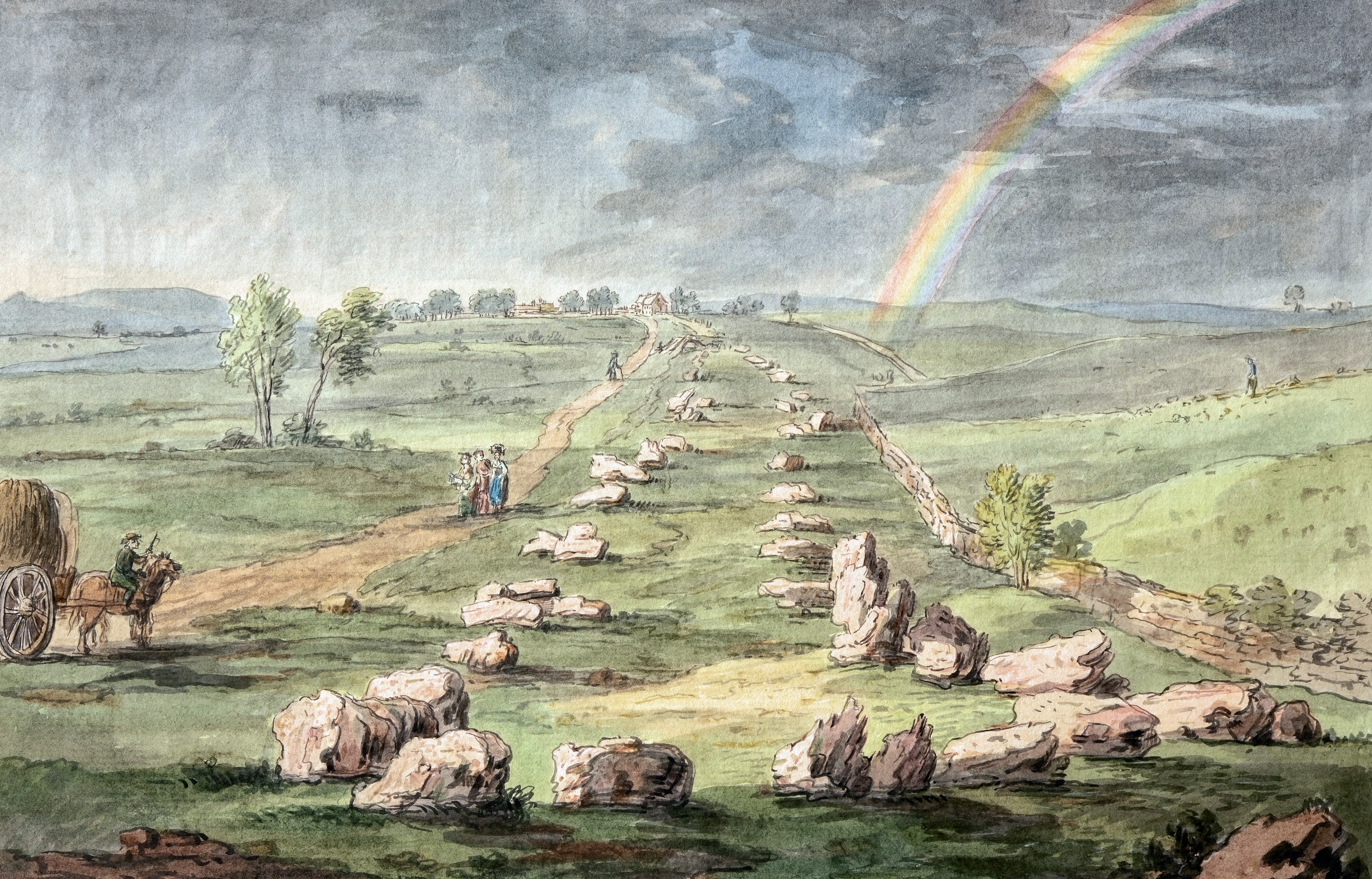
Shap Avenue, 1777, as painted by Lady Mary Lowther. The view is from the southern terminal to the avenue, known as Kemp Howe.

In addition, the northern focus of some of the stones of Shap Avenue 'north' appears to be the burial mound at Skellaw Hill; the southern focus of some of the stones of Shap Avenue 'south' also seems to be a burial mound or mounds.

Traces of eight stones mark the avenue which led in a northwest direction from the Kemp Howe stone circle. Four of the avenue stones can still be seen in fields to the west of Shap: NY562147, NY555153, NY559150 (the Goggleby Stone), and NY558152 (Asper's Field).

Heading north to south, the following major features may be seen:

=== The Thunder Stone ===
The avenue's first major stone is the massive Thunder Stone (grid reference NY551158) which is located 3 km northwest of the Kemp Howe stone circle, and is just to the north-west of Skellaw Hill. This stone was not set into the ground, but lies on the surface left by the retreating ice, so "may not thus be a part of the constructed avenue".

=== Skellaw Hill barrow ===
The avenue passes by the Skellaw Hill barrow, an Early Bronze Age burial cairn (estimated to date to approximately 2500 - 1800 BC) also known as the Hill of Skulls or Skellow Hill, (grid reference NY556155), a round burial mound. It is located 2.4 km northwest of the Kemp Howe stone circle.

=== Asper's Field Stone ===
The Asper's Field Stone is a massive boulder on private land, about nine feet high by five feet wide, that has fallen on its side. It has two cup markings on the top, one with a single ring around it. It, like the Goggleby Stone, is set in concrete at its base.

=== Goggleby Stone ===
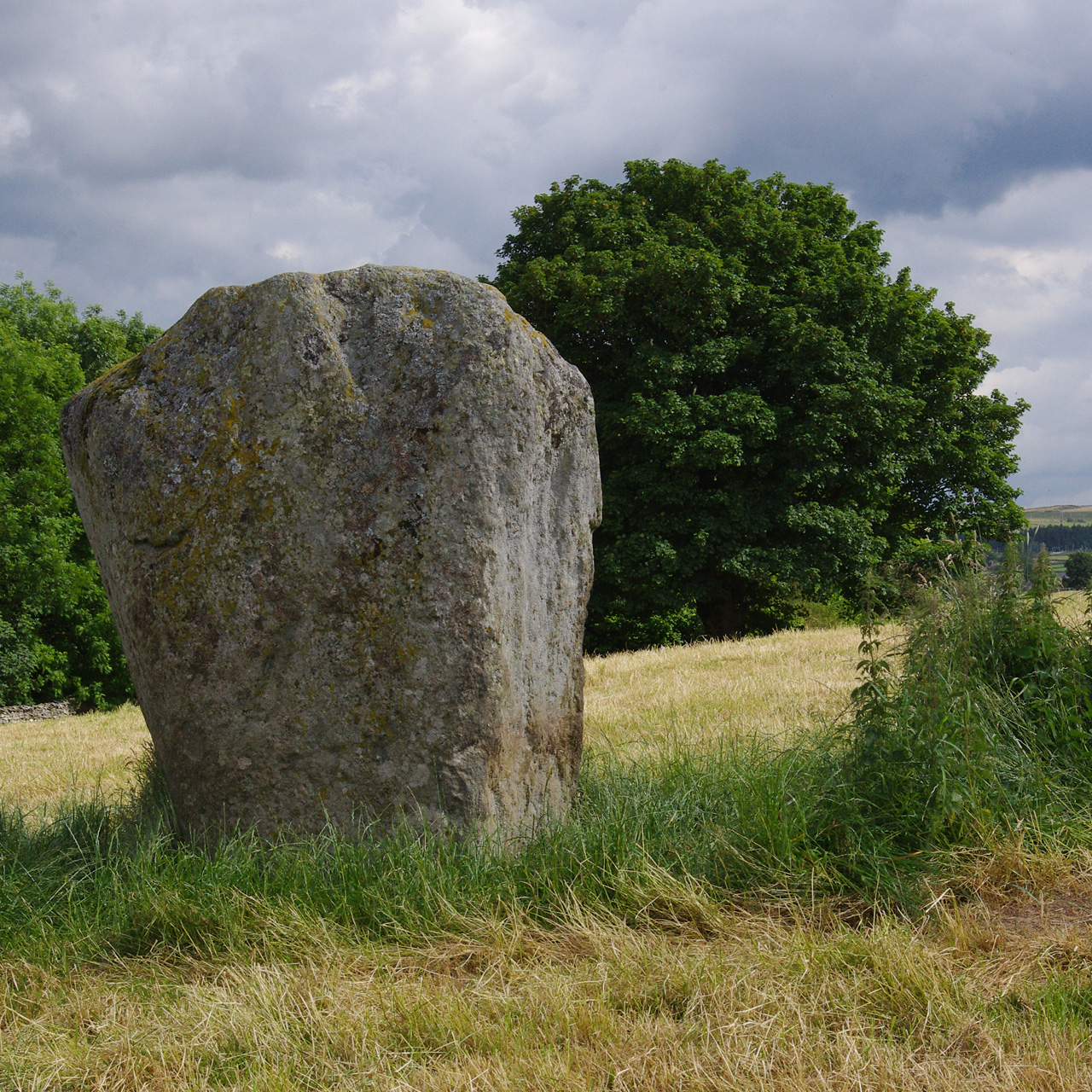
The Goggleby Stone, the tallest surviving stone of the lost avenue. It was reerected by Tom Clare and his team in the 1970s, and its base encased in cement.

The Goggleby Stone (grid reference NY559150) is the next one to be seen, just south of Asper's Field. It is located in a field down a back road between Keld and Shap. The Goggleby Stone is about ten feet high and has a cup mark on its north face, and an artificial shallow depression above it. The Goggleby stone had fallen, but was re-erected by Tom Clare, the County Archaeologist, after having excavated it.

==== Carl Lofts Stone Circle ====
This supposed stone circle, never described by any first-hand sources, was mentioned by several antiquarians as having the form of Avebury, and likely features on the Routh map mentioned by William Stukeley: "huge serpentine temple, like that of ABVRY."

Local tradition, as reported by the incumbent antiquarian vicar (c1859), described a stone circle, 122 metres in diameter, with a stone in the centre that was large enough to be cut up and made into seven gateposts (which was possibly its fate). The circle was somewhere near to and north of the Greyhound Inn.

=== Kemp Howe Stone Circle ===
The remains of a quasi stone circle (grid reference NY567132) lie on the A6 road opposite the former petrol station close to a railway embankment. The circle, really the bulbous terminal to the avenue, is badly damaged, the Victorian railway-builders having driven their line right through the circle itself, and only six large pink granite stones remain in place. All of the stones are fallen. They once formed a circle with a diameter of about 14 metres.

== Dating and purpose ==
Tom Clare suggests that the avenues date to the Late Neolithic period (approximately 3,200 - 2,500 BC), based upon evidence supplied by the Goggleby Stone, and comparisons to West Kennet Avenue. Clare also points out that the Shap complex is important because of the lack of a henge (as at Mayburgh or Long Meg - though archaeology has yet to confirm this). The layout, with its similarities to the other two complexes, plus the choice of pink granite for the large stones, suggests a similar ritualistic rationale behind the monument, perhaps extending over several generations.

Adam Morgan Ibbotson believed the site to have been similar to the megalithic stone circles of the region, notably Castlerigg, Swinside, and Long Meg. However, while he believed these stone circles mimicked, and served as stone built varieties of henge monuments, Shap Avenue may have been a stone built cursus. Cumbrian Neolithic archaeology is unique in this regard, as many monuments found elsewhere are stone-built in Cumbria. In the region, long cairns take the place of long barrows, causewayed enclosures are stone built, and stone circles largely replace earthen built henges.
