= Yanwath and Eamont Bridge =

Civil parish in Cumbria, England

Coordinates: 54.642°N 2.741°W

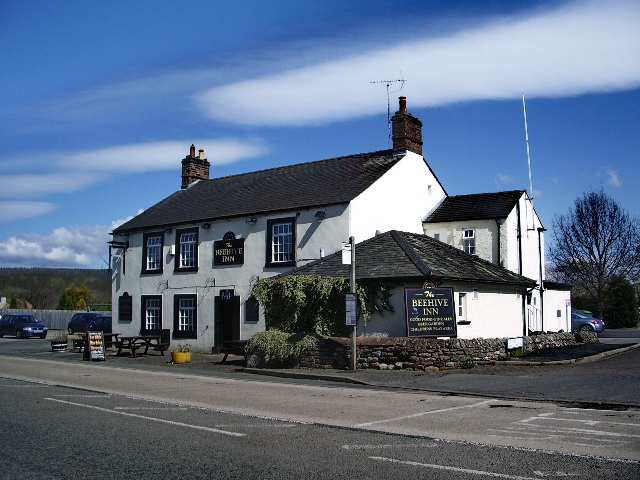
- Beehive Inn, Eamont Bridge

- Location within Cumbria
- Population: 535 (2011)
- OS grid reference: NY5228
- Civil parish: Yanwath and Eamont Bridge
- Unitary authority: Westmorland and Furness
- Ceremonial county: Cumbria
- Region: North West
- Country: England
- Sovereign state: United Kingdom
- Post town: PENRITH
- Postcode district: CA10
- Dialling code: 01768
- Police: Cumbria
- Fire: Cumbria
- Ambulance: North West
- UK Parliament: Westmorland and Lonsdale

Yanwath and Eamont Bridge is a civil parish in Westmorland and Furness, Cumbria, England, consisting of the small village of Yanwath and most of the neighbouring village of Eamont Bridge. In the 2001 census it had a population of 457, increasing to 535 at the 2011 Census.

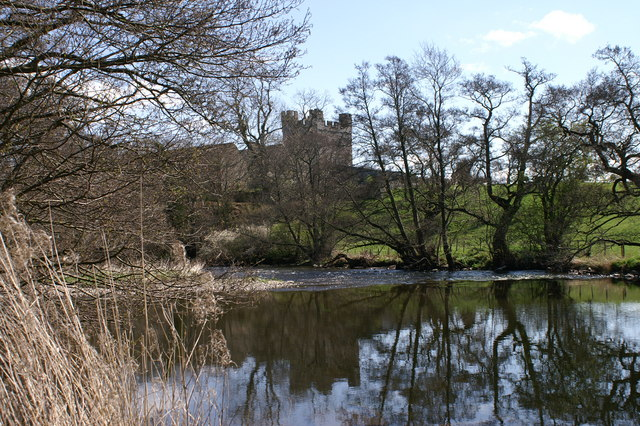
Yanwath Hall

The parish was created in 1866 and was formerly a township of Barton. The boundaries are now partially marked by the Rivers Eamont and Lowther. The parish council meets at the village hall in Eamont Bridge.

Half a mile north-west of Yanwath, Yanwath Hall is a fortified tower and hall house built in the early to mid 15th century, with 16th and 17th century alterations.

== Governance ==
The civil parish falls in the electoral ward of Eamont. This ward stretches west to Sockbridge and Tirril with a total population of 1,447.

== See also ==
- Listed buildings in Yanwath and Eamont Bridge
