= Yanwath Hall =

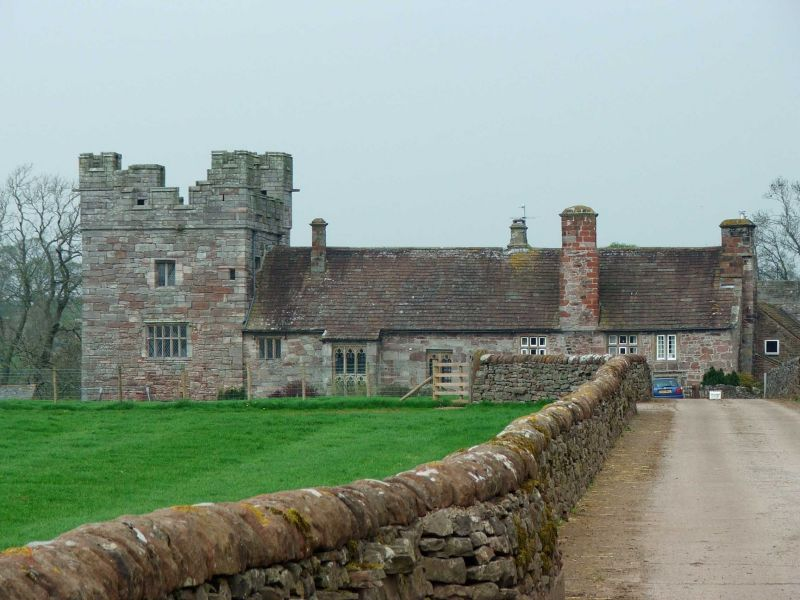
- Yanwath Hall

- Location within Cumbria
- 54°38′46″N 2°45′51″W
- Type: Tower House
- Location: Yanwath

Site notes
- Area: Cumbria
- Architectural styles: Medieval and Tudor

Listed Building – Grade I
- Official name: Yanwath Hall
- Designated: 06 February 1984
- Reference no.: 1049080

Listed Building – Grade I
- Official name: Courtyard Range Adjoining Yanwath Hall
- Designated: 06 February 1968
- Reference no.: 1145305

Listed Building – Grade II
- Official name: Barns East of Yanwath Hall
- Designated: 03 September 1987
- Reference no.: 1373883

Yanwath Hall is a 14th-century and later tower house in Yanwath, Cumbria, England. It is a grade I listed building.

Early owners included the Salkeld or Threlkeld family and Richard Dudley. A plaster ceiling and a window bay (now destroyed) included the Threlkeld and Dudley heraldry and the date "1586". Sir John Lowther bought the house in 1654.

== See also ==
- Grade I listed buildings in Cumbria
- Listed buildings in Yanwath and Eamont Bridge
