= Eamont Bridge =

Coordinates: 54.646°N 2.738°W

- Village
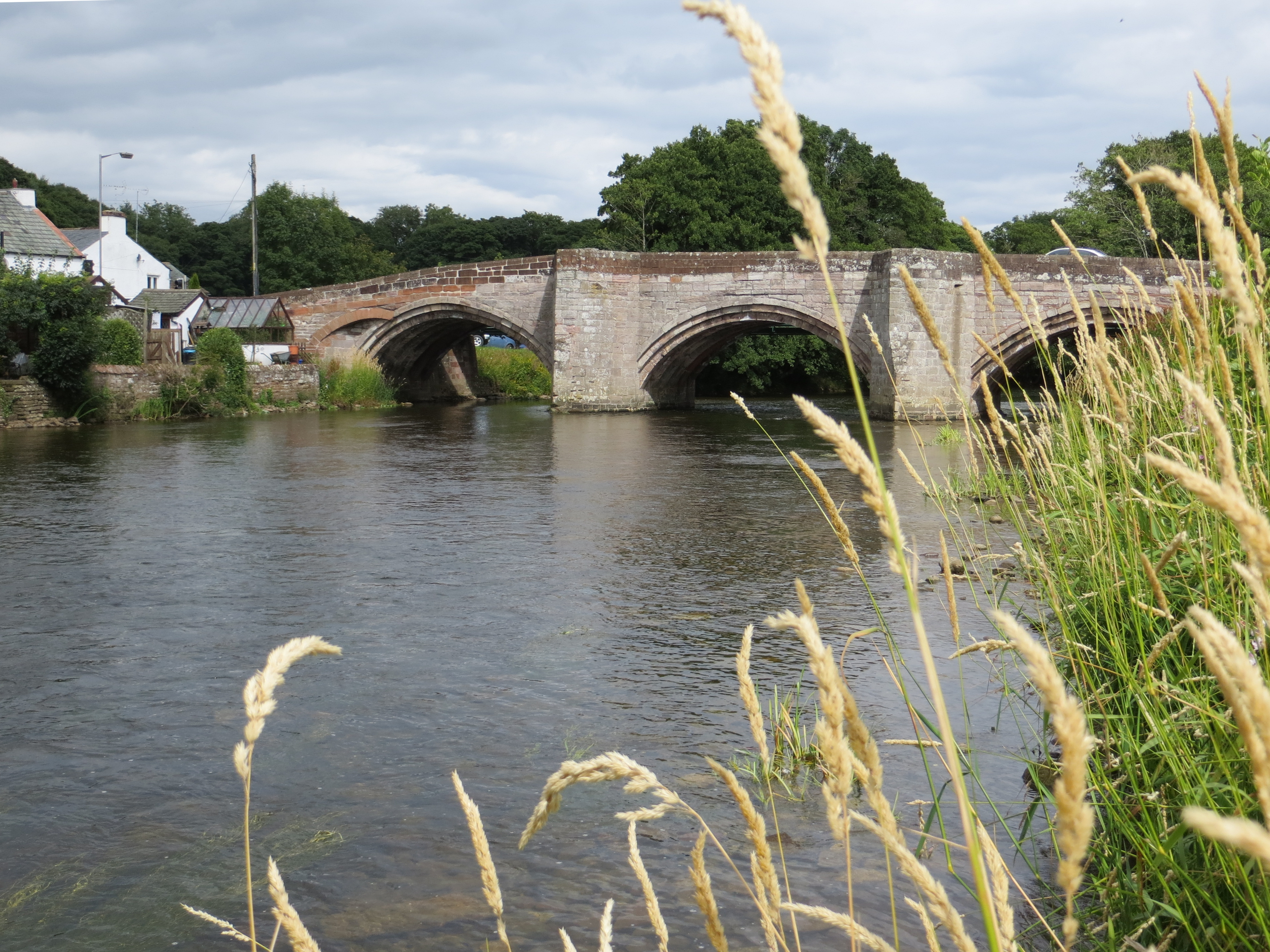
- Eamont Bridge

- Location in the former Eden District Location within Cumbria
- OS grid reference: NY523281
- Civil parish: Yanwath and Eamont Bridge; Penrith
- Unitary authority: Westmorland and Furness
- Ceremonial county: Cumbria
- Region: North West
- Country: England
- Sovereign state: United Kingdom
- Post town: PENRITH
- Postcode district: CA10
- Dialling code: 01768
- Police: Cumbria
- Fire: Cumbria
- Ambulance: North West
- UK Parliament: Westmorland and Lonsdale; Penrith and Solway

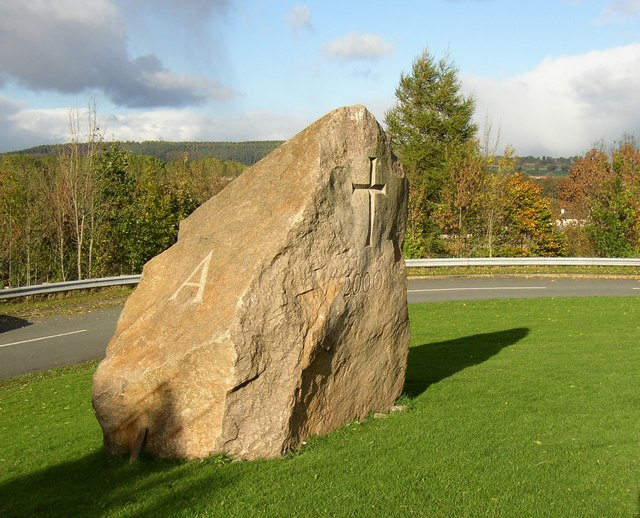
The Eden Millennium Monument, a 50 tonne inscribed stone, was placed overlooking Eamont Bridge in 2000

Eamont Bridge is a small village immediately to the south of Penrith, Cumbria, England.

The village is named after the bridge over the River Eamont and straddles the boundary between the historic counties of Cumberland and Westmorland. One of the houses in the village is called the "Welcome Inn" and was at one time the "Welcome into Cumberland Inn".

== Features ==
There are two ancient sites in the village, namely the earthwork known as King Arthur's Round Table and the much better preserved Mayburgh Henge which is situated between the rivers Lowther and Eamont. Mayburgh Henge was built using stones from one or both rivers. The location between the rivers was probably important when it was built 3000 or 4000 years ago, which protected it from invasion. Both sites are under the protection of Historic England. There was another henge close to King Arthur's Round Table, which is now obliterated. A cup was reputed to have been found at the centre of the King Arthur's Round Table Henge. The gateway from Mayburgh Henge points in the direction of King Arthur's Round Table, which was probably a convenient meeting place for millennia. There are several more henges in the area, with at least two towards the north-east, towards Brougham, visible. There is a splendid example of vernacular architecture in the centre of the village.

The southern or Westmorland half of the village lies within the civil parish of Yanwath and Eamont Bridge, and the northern part (Skirsgill Lane and Kemplay Bank) is within the civil parish of Penrith. For other local government matters, Eamont Bridge lies within the Westmorland and Furness wards of Penrith South and Eamont & Shap.

There are two pubs opposite each other at the southern end of the village.

A nearby cave called Giant's Cave is associated with several legends. It is variously said to have been the home of a giant named Isir, or an evil knight named Tarquin who imprisoned 64 men in the cave, or Uther Pendragon.

== Bridge ==
The village lies on the A6 road. Until the opening of the M6 motorway, it was a notorious bottleneck because of the narrow bridge over the River Eamont which is still today controlled by traffic lights.

The Grade I listed bridge crosses the old county boundary between Cumberland and Westmorland and is one of the oldest bridges in the country still in daily use. It probably dates from the 15th century but was widened in the 19th and the 20th centuries.

== History ==
On 12 July 927, Eamont Bridge was the scene of a gathering of kings from throughout Britain as recorded in the Anglo-Saxon Chronicle and the histories of William of Malmesbury and John of Worcester. Present were Æthelstan, Constantín mac Áeda ("Cosstantin Scotta cyning"), Owain of Gwent ("Uwen Wenta cyning"), Hywel Dda ("Huwal Westwala cyning"), and Ealdred I of Bamburgh ("Ealdred Ealdulfing from Bebbanbyrig"). This is generally seen as the date of the foundation of the Kingdom of England.

Britain in 927

== See also ==
- Listed buildings in Yanwath and Eamont Bridge
- Yanwath and Eamont Bridge
