= King Arthur's Round Table =

Neolithic henge monument

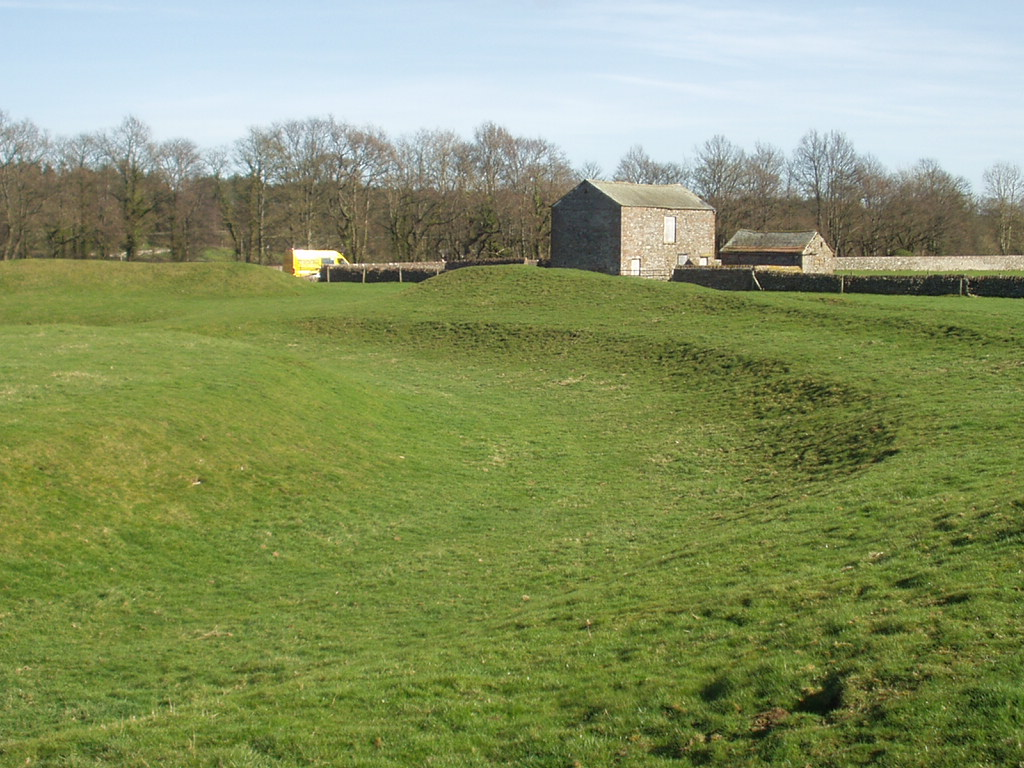
- King Arthur's Round Table

- Location in Eden, Cumbria Location in Cumbria, England
- 54.6483°N 2.7403°W
- Type: Henge
- Periods: Neolithic / Bronze Age
- Location: Eamont Bridge
- OS grid reference: NY523284

Site notes
- Owner: English Heritage
- Public access: Yes

King Arthur's Round Table is a Neolithic henge in the village of Eamont Bridge in the English county of Cumbria, around one mile (2 km) south east of Penrith. It is 400 metres from Mayburgh Henge. The site is free to visitors and is under the control of English Heritage.

== Description ==
King Arthur's Round Table is a henge situated in a field next to the A6 road in the village of Eamont Bridge, south of Penrith, Cumbria. The northern part of the henge is now covered by the B5320 road and the Crown Hotel, while the A6 road has encroached on the eastern part. The larger Mayburgh Henge is just 400 metres to the west, and the fragments of the Little Round Table henge are 200 metres to the south. This indicates the presence of a henge complex and possible ritual landscape similar to those at Thornborough or Salisbury Plain.

The henge is around 90 metres in diameter. The enclosed area is about 50 metres across; the ditch has a maximum width of 16 metres; the berm 7 metres; and the bank 13 metres. There appears to have been two original entrances, but only the south-east entrance survives as the northwest entrance has been mostly destroyed by the modern road. Parts of the henge were landscaped in the late 18th to early 19th century, apparently with an intent to use the site as a tea garden. The site is in the care of English Heritage and open to the public.

== Archaeology ==
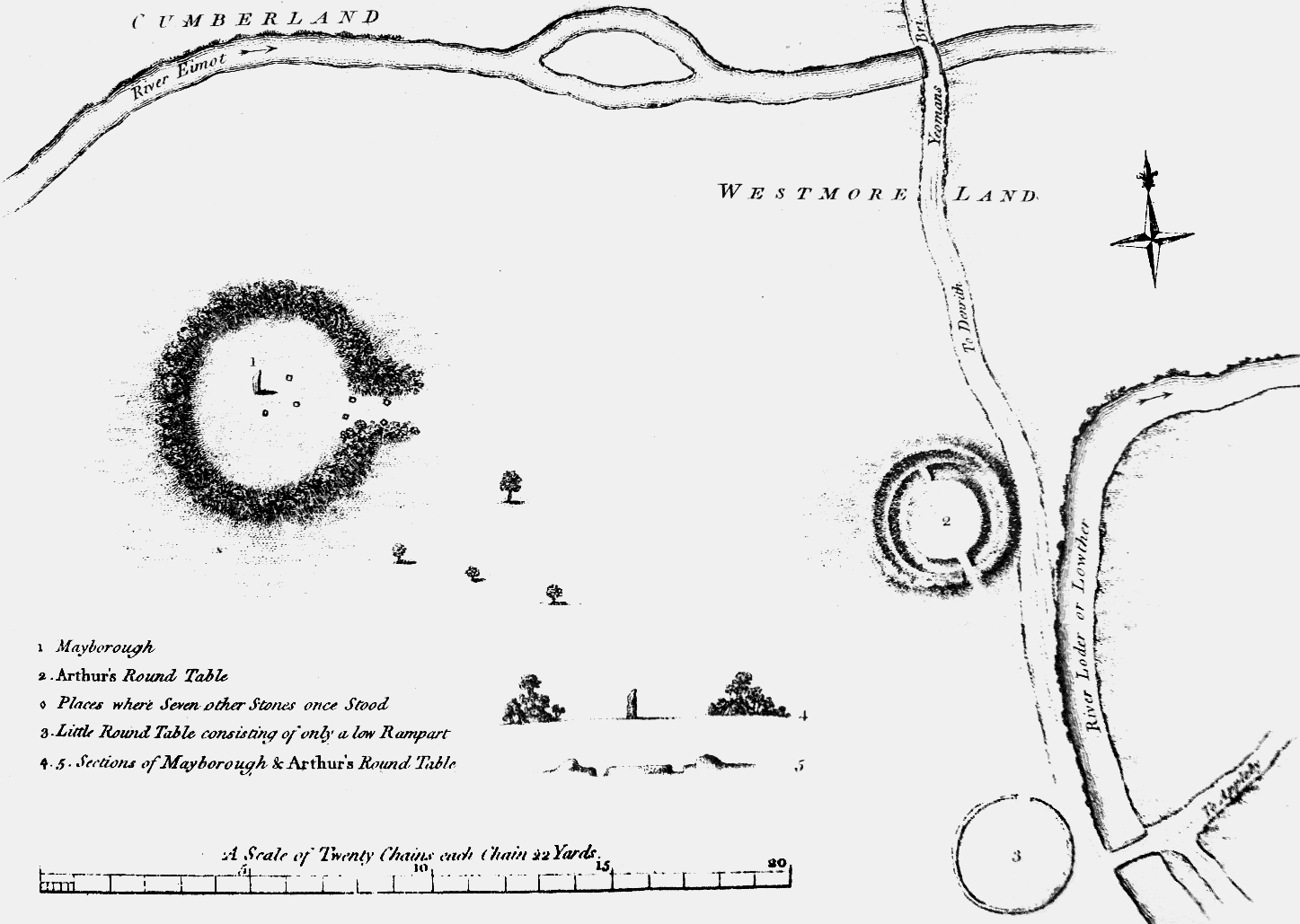
Mayburgh and King Arthur's Round Tables, 1769

Around 1664 William Dugdale sketched the remains, showing the two opposing entrances, and also showing that there were two standing stones, one each side of the northwest entrance. These stones had disappeared when William Stukeley saw the monument in 1725. In 1891, C. W. Dymond produced a comprehensive record of the remains.

Excavations were undertaken in 1937 by R. G. Collingwood and continued in 1939 by Gerhard Bersu. The excavations showed that the ditch had been cleared out and reshaped and the entrance through it made narrower in modern times. Collingwood claimed to have identified a number of structures, represented by postholes, and identified a "cremation trench" near the centre of the site. Bersu, however, contradicted most of Collingwood's findings, arguing that the posthole features were not of archaeological significance, and he found no evidence of cremation burning, although he accepted that there might be a disturbed grave. However Grace Simpson (1998), the daughter of the excavator F.G. Simpson, and Stephen Leach (2019) have queried Bersu's work and largely rehabilitated Collingwood as an excavator.

In 1988 a geophysical survey was conducted to examine the north segment and the southeast entrance, but the results were directly affected by the 18th–19th century landscaping.

== Little Round Table ==
Little Round Table henge is 200 metres to the south of King Arthur's Round Table. It is mostly destroyed by buildings, tracks and roads. There is a barely discernible bank on the northern side 30 metres in length, up to 5 metres wide, but only 15 centimetres high. There are some fragmentary traces of a low earthen bank with some stone visible along the south side. These remains suggest that the site was originally about 90 metres in diameter. This corresponds to the sketch William Stukeley made in 1725 showing a roughly circular enclosure circa 90 metres in diameter with a bank with outer ditch.

== See also ==
- Arthur's Stone, Herefordshire
