= Oddendale =

Hamlet in Cumbria, England

Coordinates: 54.514°N 2.628°W

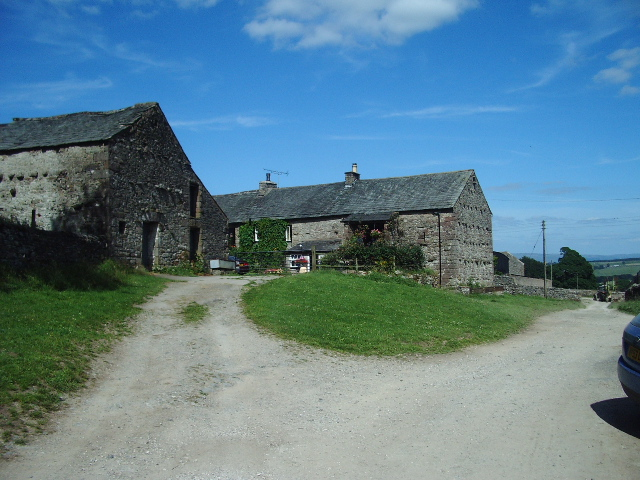
- Oddendale hamlet

- Location in Eden, Cumbria Location within Cumbria
- OS grid reference: NY593133
- Civil parish: Crosby Ravensworth
- Unitary authority: Westmorland and Furness
- Ceremonial county: Cumbria
- Region: North West
- Country: England
- Sovereign state: United Kingdom
- Post town: PENRITH
- Postcode district: CA10
- Dialling code: 01931
- Police: Cumbria
- Fire: Cumbria
- Ambulance: North West
- UK Parliament: Westmorland and Lonsdale

Oddendale is a hamlet in Cumbria, England, near the large village of Shap. For transport there is the M6 motorway and the A6 road.

== History ==
=== Oddendale stone circle ===
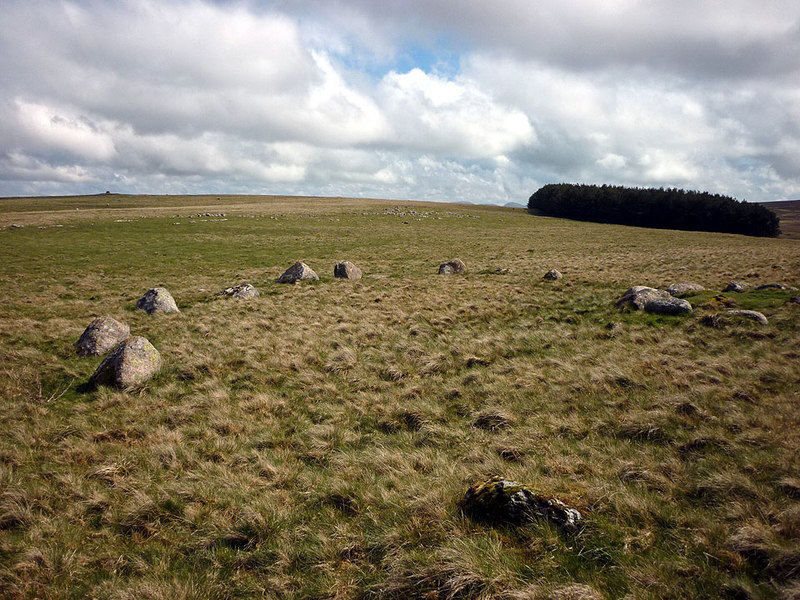
Outer cairn circle

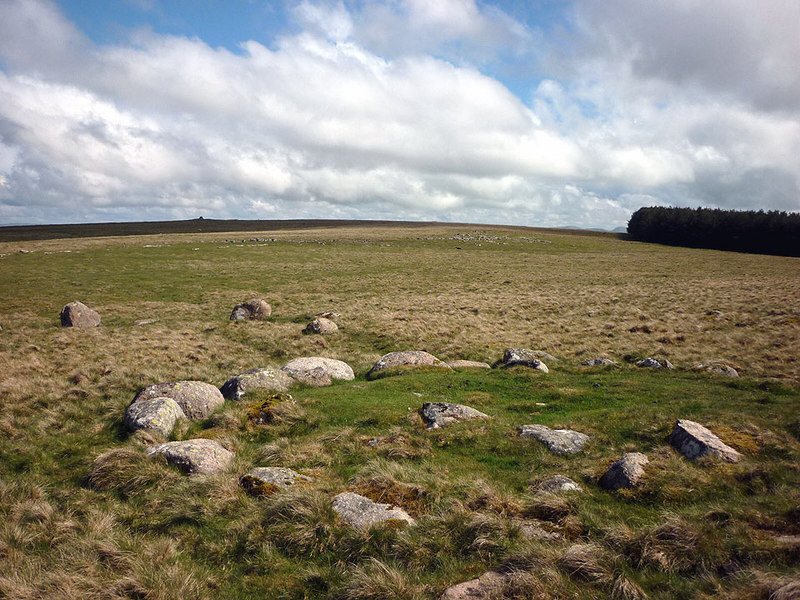
Inner cairn circle

Oddendale has a stone circle nearby, (grid reference NY59201290), part of the complex of cairns, stone circles and standing stones that includes the 'Shap Stone Avenue' of monuments. The site has benefitted from an extensive and relatively recent (1997) excavation that revealed various stages in the monument's history: firstly, two concentric circles of oak wooden posts (dating to the Neolithic, c. 2,872–2,350 BC); followed by their removal and replacement with stone cappings of pink granite; followed by an Early Bronze Age ring cairn built over the inner circle surfaced with blue/gray stones and yellow/white pieces of flat limestone, with cremated bone, pottery and other 'token' grave goods; and then a fourth stage which saw the addition of a pink granite platform on to the side of the cairn, which itself had a kerb of red stones around it.

The colouring of the stones may have had ritualistic significance. The replacement of the wooden circles by stone ones is a feature shared with some other monuments and may represent the replacement of concern for the living (and the Sun) by devotion to the dead (and the Moon or Sunset).

A second circle and ring cairn was excavated not far away at grid reference NY59031352.

== See also ==
- Listed buildings in Crosby Ravensworth
