= River Eamont =

River in Cumbria, England

Coordinates: 54°40′N 2°37′W

Eamont
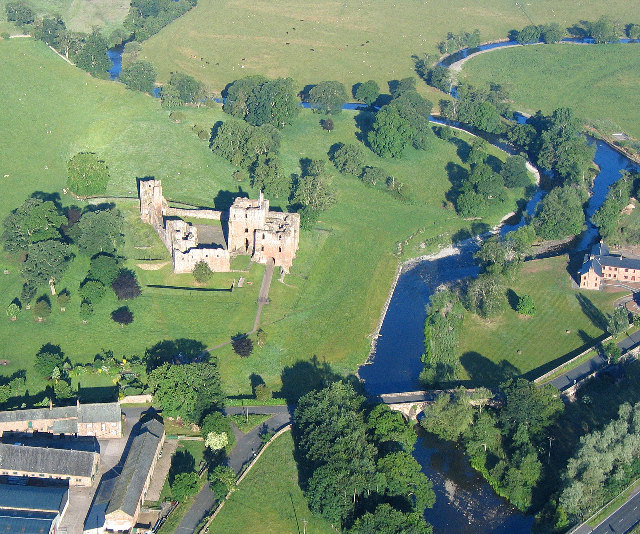
- The River Eamont where it is joined by the River Lowther close to Brougham Castle

Location
- Country: United Kingdom
- Part: England

Physical characteristics
- Source
  - location: Ullswater
- Mouth
  - location: confluence with River Eden
- Length: 8 km (5.0 mi)

Basin features
- Tributaries
  - left: Dacre Beck, Thacka Beck
  - right: River Lowther

The River Eamont is a river in Cumbria, England and one of the major tributaries of the River Eden. The name of the river is from Old English (ēa-gemōt) and is a back formation from Eamont Bridge which means the 'junction of streams'.

For its whole length, the Eamont marks the boundary of the traditional counties of Cumberland to the north with Westmorland to the south.

The river is formed by the outflow from Ullswater in the Lake District, later augmented by Dacre Beck from the west and the River Lowther which carries the water from Haweswater north to the Eamont at Penrith. It reaches the Eden 4 miles (7 km) east of Penrith.

The river has flooded on numerous occasions; the most recent was when Storm Desmond hit in December 2015. During the flooding, 300-year old Pooley Bridge was washed away and a temporary bridge had to be installed to reconnect the two halves of the village. The same storm damaged the Grade I listed Eamont Bridge, but after masonry work, it re-opened in March 2016. In April 2019 preparatory works began to replace the temporary bridge with a new bridge. The crossing was closed from September 2019 until Easter 2020, while the new bridge was installed.

The river is also a stronghold of the endangered white clawed crayfish (Austropotamobius pallipes).
