= Castlerigg stone circle =

Stone circle in Cumbria, England

Castlerigg Stone Circle
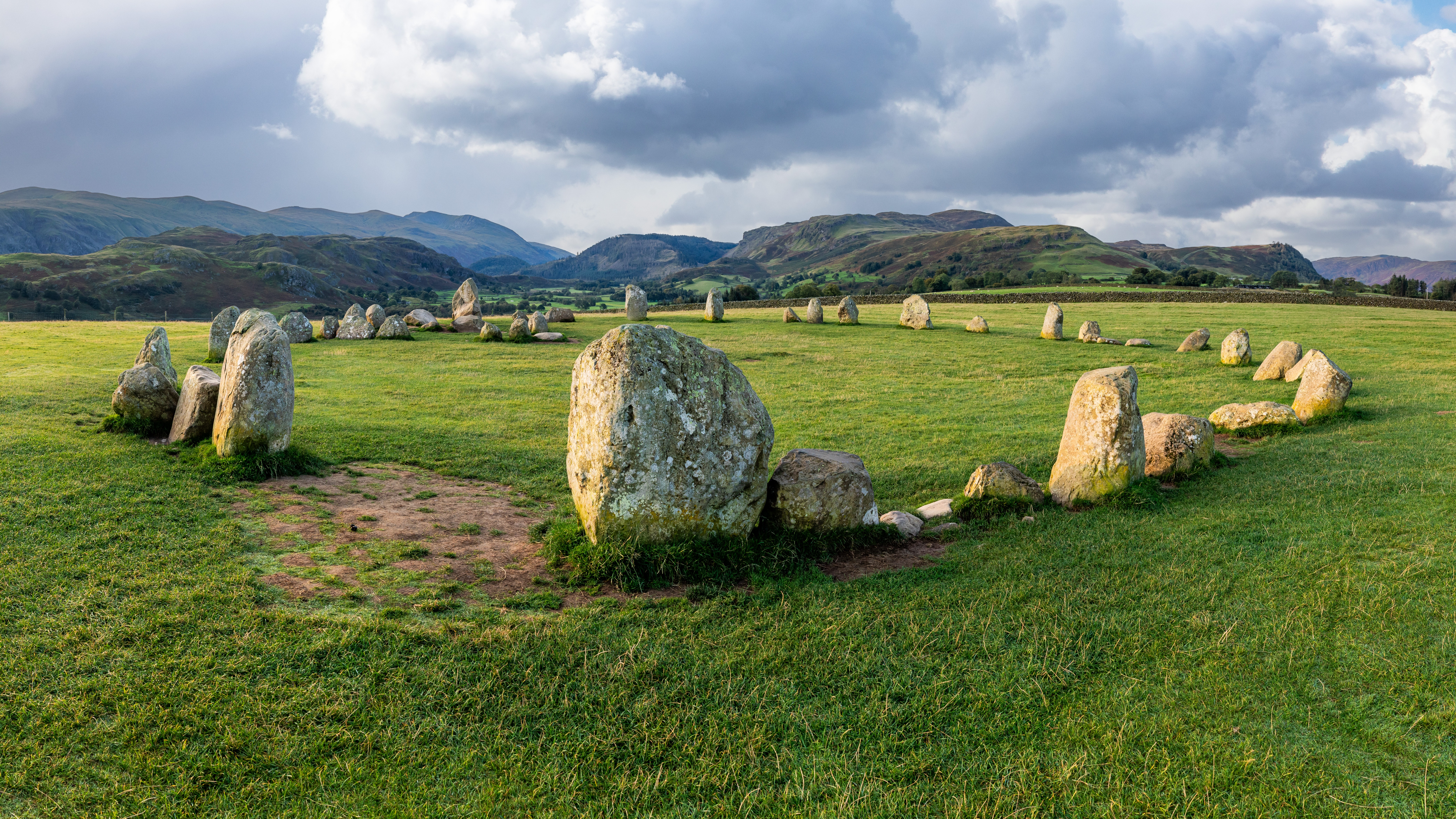
- Castlerigg Stone Circle

- Location in England, United Kingdom
- 54°36′10″N 3°05′54″W
- Type: Stone circle
- Periods: Neolithic / Bronze Age
- Location: England, United Kingdom

History
- Built: c. 3200 BC

Site notes
- Owner: English Heritage

Scheduled monument
- Designated: 18 August 1882
- Reference no.: 1011362

Castlerigg stone circle (alternatively Keswick Carles, or Carles) is situated on a prominent hill to the east of Keswick, in the Lake District National Park, North West England.

In this period, the Lake District – a mountainous area in which Castlerigg is located – saw particularly high levels of Neolithic stone circle construction, with other similar examples including Swinside, Gamelands, Elva Plain, and Long Meg and Her Daughters. The original purposes of such large stone circles is still debated, although most archaeologists concur that they were built for ritual or ceremonial reasons, with a similar function to henges.

Various archaeologists have mentioned the beauty and romance of Castlerigg and its surrounding landscape. In his study of the stone circles of Cumbria, archaeologist John Waterhouse commented that the site was "one of the most visually impressive prehistoric monuments in Britain."

Every year, thousands of tourists travel to the site, making it the most visited stone circle in Cumbria. This plateau forms the raised centre of a natural amphitheatre created by the surrounding fells and from within the circle it is possible to see some of the highest peaks in Cumbria: Helvellyn, Skiddaw, Grasmoor and Blencathra.

== Description ==
The stones are glacial erratic boulders composed of volcanic rock from the Borrowdale Volcanic Group. Both andesitic lavas and tuffs (volcanic ashes) are represented. Castlerigg sits on a deposit of glacial till, and it is likely that the boulders were originally part of this deposit. The stones are set in a flattened circle, measuring 32.6 metres (107 ft) at its widest and 29.5 metres (97 ft) at its narrowest. The heaviest stone has been estimated to weigh around 16 tons and the tallest stone measures approximately 2.3 metres high. There is a 3.3 metre wide gap in its northern edge, which may have been an entrance.

Within the circle, abutting its eastern quadrant, is a roughly rectangular setting of a further 10 stones. This internal setting is highly unusual among British stone circles, and has no agreed functional interpretation. Although once interpreted as a burial space or ritual compartment, excavation has produced no evidence sufficient to confirm either explanation.

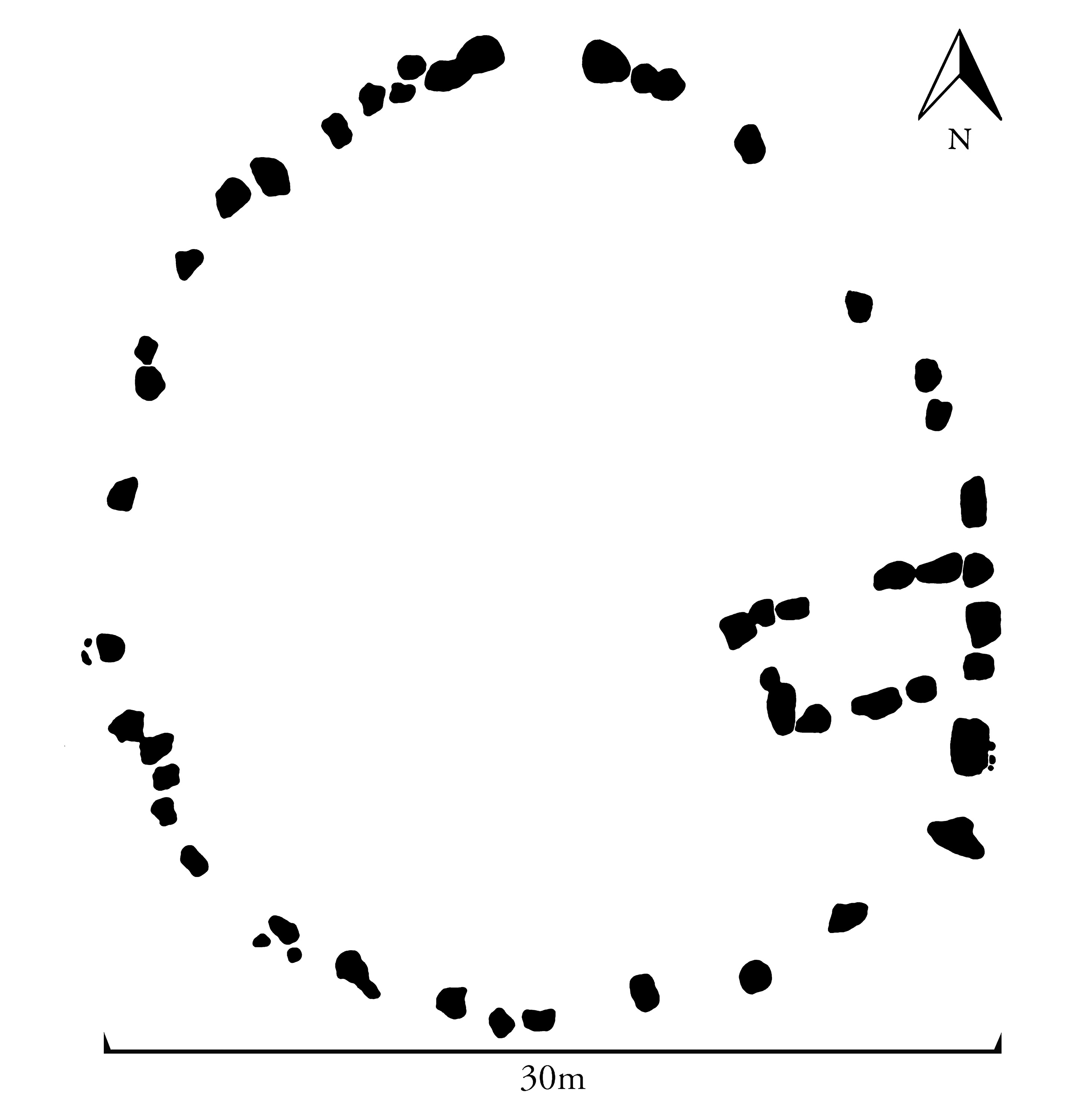
A plan of Castlerigg Stone Circle

Antiquarian observers in the nineteenth century recorded several low internal mounds within the eastern half of the circle, commonly described as cairns or small burial features. Their form was never clearly defined, and because none were excavated under modern archaeological conditions, their date and purpose remain uncertain. They are often interpreted as later Bronze Age additions inserted into an already ancient monument, although a 2021 re-examination of Benjamin Williams's 1856 description has suggested that one mound may have contained a Langdale tuff axe, raising the possibility that at least some burials within the circle could belong to the Neolithic.

Due to erosion of the soil around the stones, caused by the large number of visitors to the monument, several smaller stones have 'appeared' next to some of the larger stones. Because these stones are so small, they are likely to have been packing stones used to support the larger stones when the circle was constructed and would originally have been buried. Differences in opinion as to the exact number of stones within Castlerigg are usually down to whether the observer counts these small packing stones, or not; some count only 38 and others as high as 42. Modern counts vary, partly because several smaller stones visible at ground level are likely packing stones used to stabilise larger uprights rather than intended standing elements.

In the early 20th century, a single outlying stone was erected by a farmer approximately 90m to the south west of Castlerigg. This stone has many linear 'scars' along its side from being repeatedly struck by a plough, suggesting that it was once buried below the surface and also why the farmer dug it up. It is not possible to say whether this stone was originally part of the circle, or a naturally deposited boulder.

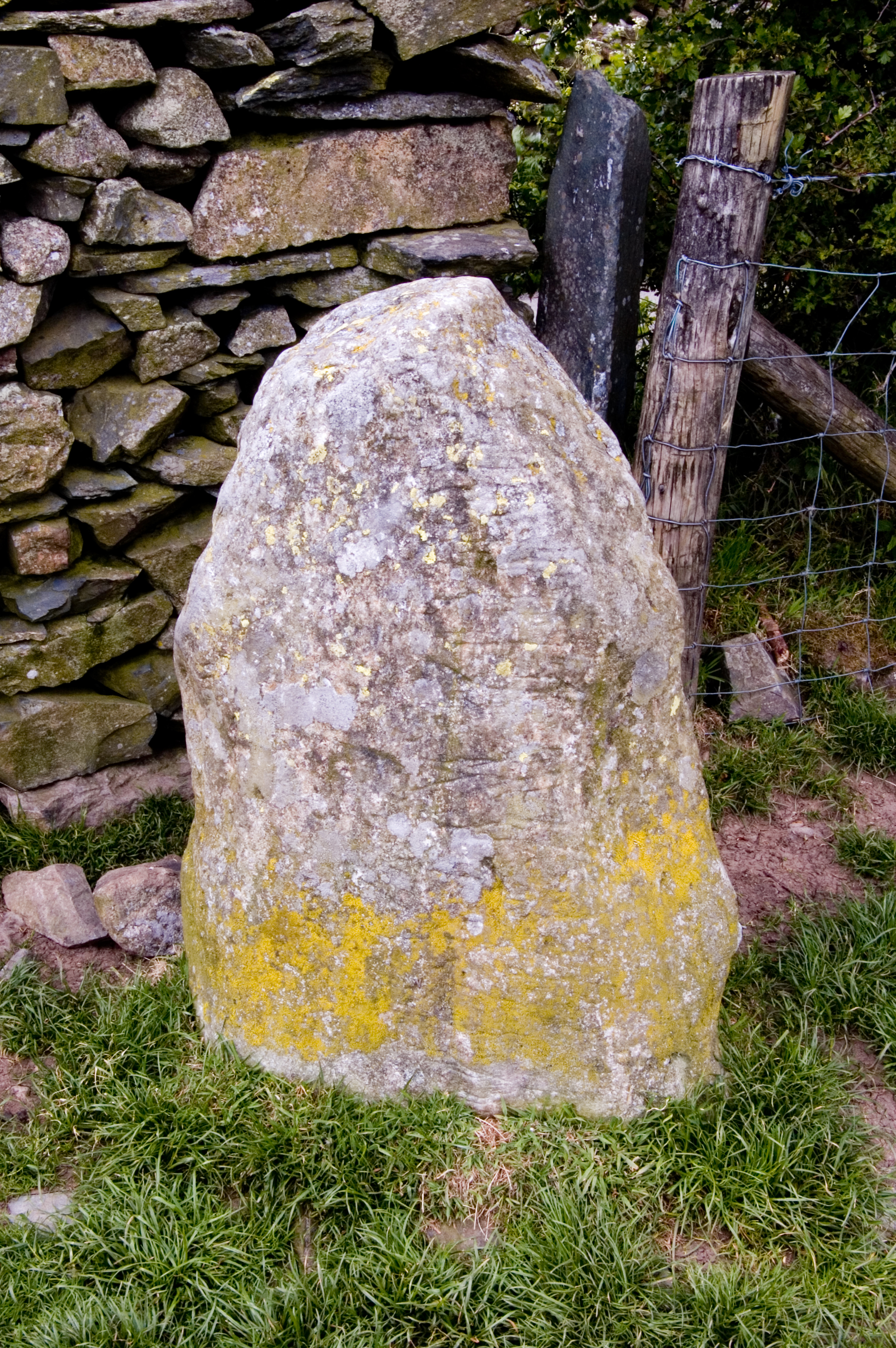
Outlying stone at Castlerigg stone circle showing possible damage caused by ploughing

One of Castlerigg's most striking characteristics is the way its position controls visibility. Although surrounded by lower ground, the monument sits at the apex of a rounded hill where nearby land falls from view, leaving distant mountain horizons dominant from within the circle. Various horizon alignments have been proposed, particularly towards eastern skyline notches, but no astronomical axis has gained universal acceptance.

== Archaeological speculation ==
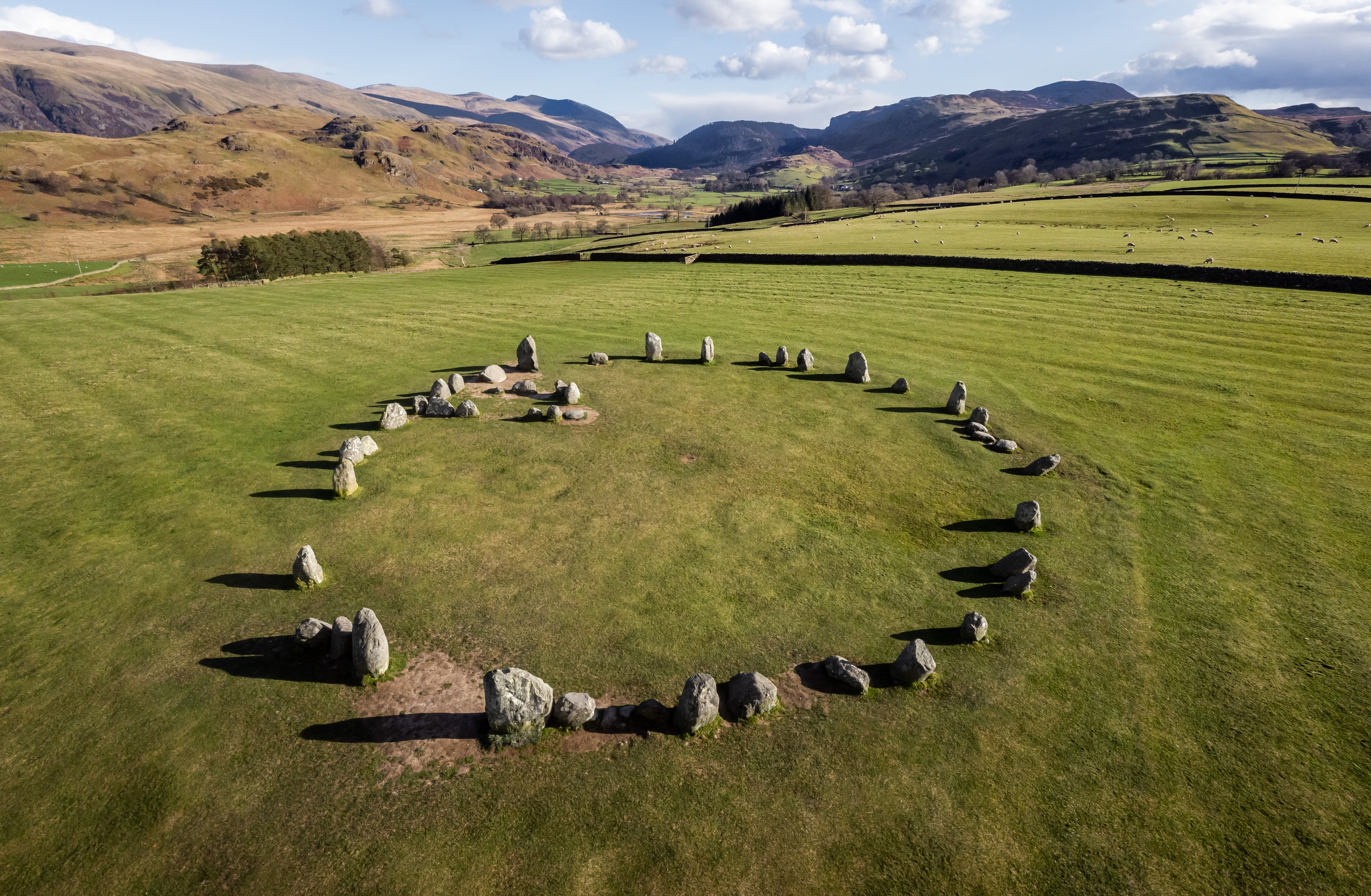
Castlerigg Stone Circle as seen from the sky to the north, looking towards the Thirlmere Valley. Note the numerous circular features within it – these are believed to be later Bronze Age secondary burial mounds.

The appearance of large stone circle enclosures in the Lake District appears to have coincided with a wave of Irish passage tomb culture appearing across the west of Great Britain, with affinities with the Brú na Bóinne of eastern Ireland. Rock art reminiscient of this culture, dated to the mid to late Neolithic, is found across the Lake District, such as Langdale Boulders and the rock carvings at Grasmere. It is particularly associated with the Langdale axe factory, which quarried around a third of all known polished stone axes from Neolithic Britain. This culture appears to have swept up and down the coast of Great Britain, leaving megalithic stone circles and passage tombs in their wake.

Aubrey Burl classed such circles as 'Cumbrian Circles': large, open stone enclosures spacious enough for gatherings. Although often thought widespread, true stone circles of this type are uncommon, with only five surviving in Cumbria: Swinside, Castlerigg, Elva Plain, Long Meg, and Gamelands . Others are also found locally, including the Twelve Apostles, the Girdle Stanes, and further to the north in Northumbria there are the Hethpool Stone Circles. Such enclosures may have functioned as sacred settings for ritual, assembly, and perhaps astronomical observation, representing a local variety of henge, built in stone rather than earth.

Castlerigg is generally assigned to the late fourth millennium BC, often around 3200 BC. This is on typological grounds rather than direct dating, which would place it among the earliest known stone circles in Britain. It also places it within the time period when the Irish Passage Tomb culture is known to have been present in western Great Britain. Such a connection may relate to the only known rock art at the site – a single lozenge on stone 13, on the western edge of the circle.

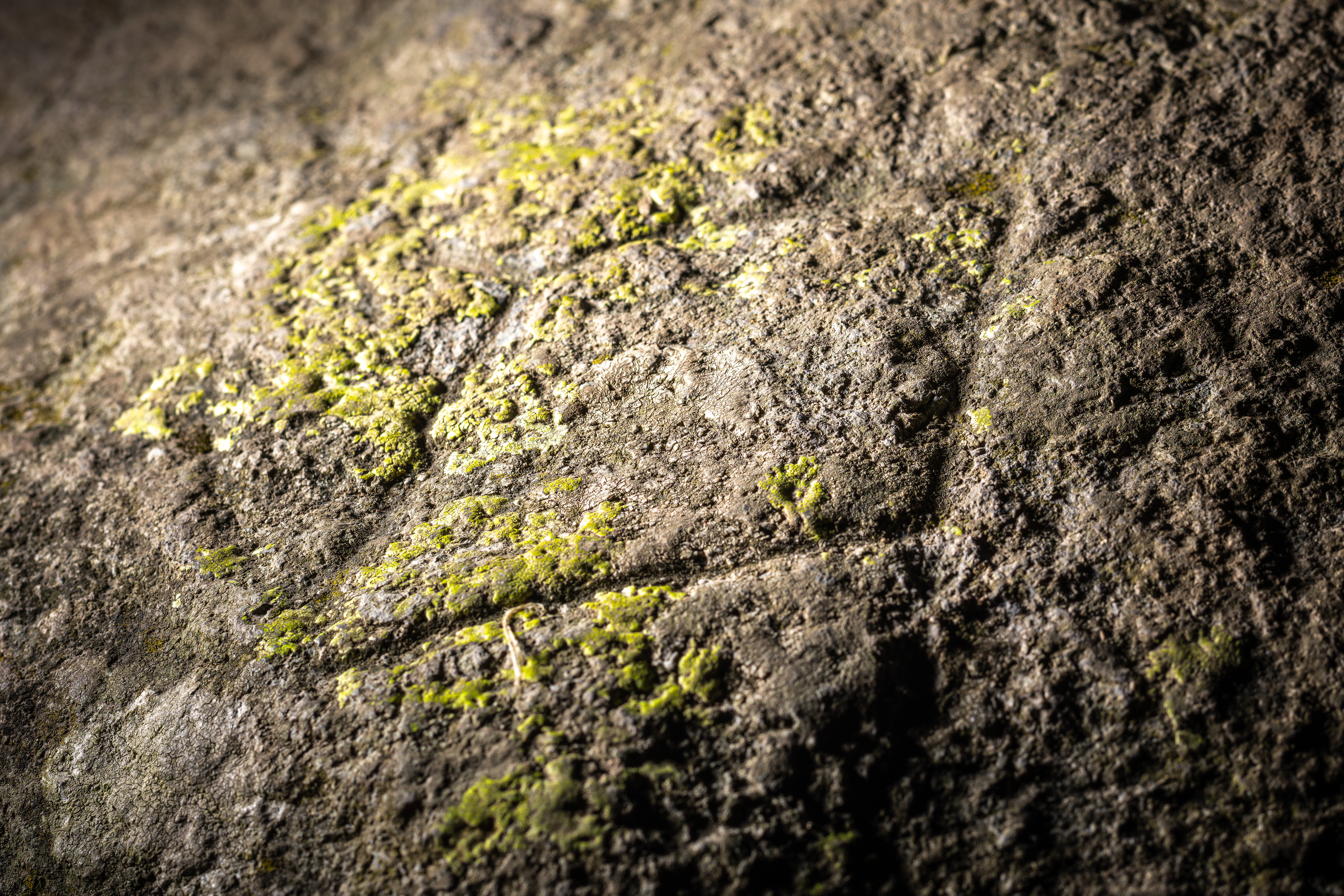
A lozenge carved into stone 13 of Castlerigg Stone Circle

The original motives behind the construction of Castlerigg, its subsequent uses, and how these may have changed over time are not known. The circle has often been linked to wider ceremonial networks associated with Langdale axe production, perhaps serving as a gathering place where exchange, movement, and ritual overlapped. Evidence for this comes from 19th century reports of "rude stone clubs" being found within the circle's northwestern quardrant, where several small mounds are found. However, such finds are not rare within Neolithic ritual sites in the region, and it isn't clear what connection this mid to late Neolithic site had with the Early Neolithic stone axe trade.

Ritually deposited stone axes have been found all over Britain, suggesting that their uses went far beyond their practical capabilities. Exchange or trading of stone axes may not have been possible without first taking part in a ritual or ceremony. Recent dating of the notable 'axe factory' at Pike o' Stickle, Great Langdale, indicates that production here likely ceased by 3300 BC, which predates proposed date for Castlerigg by at least 100 years.

=== Associated Prehistoric Sites in the Region ===
- Swinside Stone Circle
- Elva Plain Stone Circle
- Long Meg and Her Daughters
- Gamelands Stone Circle
- Grasmere Rock Art
- Copt Howe (Langdale Boulders)
- Twelve Apostles Stone Circle
- The Lochmaben Stone

=== Associated Prehistoric Sites in Great Britain and Ireland ===
- Rollright Stones
- Newgrange, Knowth and Dowth
- Stonehenge
- Avebury
- Stanton Drew
- Thornborough Henges
- Devil's Arrows
- Kington Russell

== Antiquarian study of Castlerigg ==
Two of Britain's earliest antiquarians, John Aubrey and William Camden visited Cumbria with an interest in studying the area's megalithic monuments. Both described Long Meg and Her Daughters, another large stone circle to the northeast of Penrith, and recounted local legend and folklore associated with this monument, but neither writers mentions a visit to Castlerigg or the area around Keswick. John Aubrey was also the first writer to erroneously connect Neolithic and Bronze Age megalithic monuments with the Iron Age Druids.

It was not until the early 18th century that Castlerigg came to the attention of the wider public, when William Stukeley visited the site in 1725.

Stukeley's account of his visit to Castlerigg is brief and was published in his Itinerarium Curiosum in 1776, 11 years after his death. Stukeley's visit is important, as it is the earliest written record of the stone circle at Castlerigg:

...for a mile before we came to Keswick, on an eminence in the middle of a great concavity of those rude hills, and not far from the banks of the river Greata, I observed another Celtic work, very intire: it is 100 foot in diameter, and consists of forty stones, some very large. At the east end of it is a grave, made of such other stones, in number about ten: this is placed in the very east point of the circle, and within it: there is not a stone wanting, though some are removed a little out of their first station: they call it the Carsles, and, corruptly I suppose, Castle-rig. There seemed to be another larger circle in the next pasture toward the town. (Stukeley 1969 Vol. II, 48).

Stukeley could be describing the circle as it stands today, as it has changed little in the three centuries since his visit. The rectangular enclosure within the circle, that Stukeley took to be a grave, still consists of 10 stones. It is not clear, however, why Stukeley believed the circle was not missing a single stone. Today there are several large gaps in the circle, suggesting that a number of stones may have indeed been either moved into a different position (possibly after the stone had fallen or been removed completely). Of course, there is no certainty today as to the original appearance of the circle, or how much it may have changed in the preceding millennia, prior to Stukeley's visit. It is believed, however, that the circle survives today in a relatively intact state, changed certainly, but not so far from its original design.

Stukeley's observation of a second circle in the next field is a great revelation that places the stones at Castlerigg in a whole new light; that he fails to deliver a description demonstrates well the frustration felt by modern researchers when dealing with the works of antiquarians. This account could easily be dismissed today as pure fancy or it could be thought that he had mistakenly described a natural feature, as there is no evidence of it today, either above ground or in the observations of later scholars.

== The 19th century ==
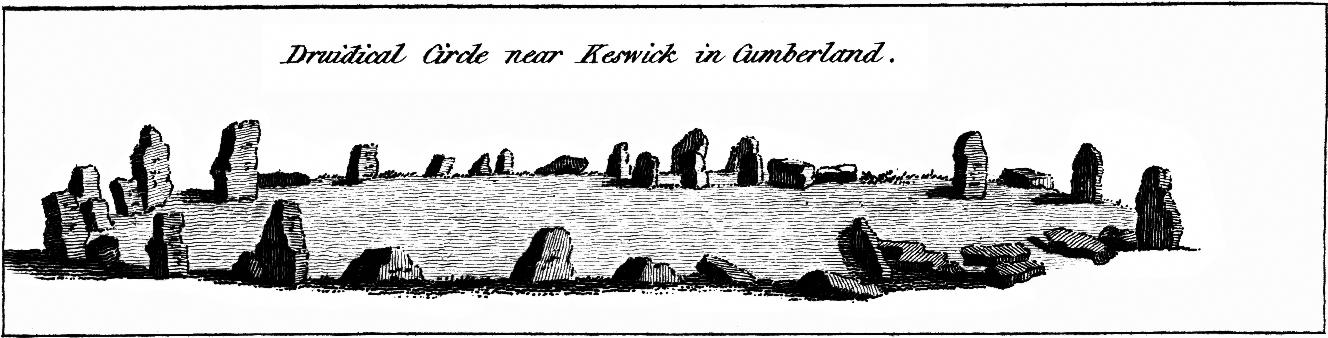
Druidical Circle near Keswick in Cumberland, by F. Grose, 1783

The apparently unspoilt and seemingly timeless landscape setting of Castlerigg stone circle provided inspiration for the poets, painters and writers of the 19th-century Romantic movement. In John Keats' Hyperion, the passage "Scarce images of life, one here, one there,/Lay vast and edgeways; like a dismal cirque/Of Druid stones, upon a forlorn moor..." is alleged to have been inspired by his visit to the stones; a visit, it seems, with which he was less than impressed. Samuel Taylor Coleridge, in 1799, visited Castlerigg with fellow poet William Wordsworth and wrote of it, that a mile and a half from Keswick stands "...a Druidical circle [where] the mountains stand one behind the other, in orderly array as if evoked by and attentive to the assembly of white-vested wizards".

An early description of Castlerigg stone circle can be found in the 1843 book The Wonders of the World in Nature, Art and Mind, by Robert Sears. In the passage quoted below, Sears also quotes an earlier description of the circle by Ann Radcliffe (Mrs. Radcliffe).

The Druidical Circle, represented in the accompanying plate, is to be found on the summit of a bold and commanding eminence called Castle-Rigg, about a mile and a half on the old road, leading from Keswick, over the hills to Penrith,—a situation so wild, vast, and beautiful, that one cannot, perhaps, find better terms to convey an idea of it than by adopting the language of a celebrated female writer, (Mrs. Radclifle,) who, travelling over the same ground years ago, thus described the scene: "Whether our judgment," she says, "was influenced by the authority of a Druid's choice, or that the place itself commanded the opinion, we thought this situation the most severely grand of any hitherto passed. There is, perhaps, not a single object in the scene that interrupts the solemn tone of feeling impressed by its general character of profound solitude, greatness, and awful wildness. Castle-Rigg is the centre point of three valleys that dart immediately under it from the eye, and whose mountains form part of an amphitheatre, which is completed by those of Borrowdale on the west, and by the precipices of Skiddaw and Saddleback, close on the north. The hue which pervades all these mountains is that of dark heath or rock; they are thrown into every form and direction that fancy would suggest, and are at that distance which allows all their grandeur to prevail. Such seclusion and sublimity were indeed well suited to the dark and wild mysteries of the Druids."

Sears then continues his description:

The one here represented is of the first, or simple class, and consists, at present, of about forty stones of different sizes, all, or most of them, of dark granite,— the highest about seven feet, several about four, and others considerably less; the few fir-trees in the centre are, of course, of very modern growth. The form may, with more propriety, be called an oval, being thirty-five yards in one direction, and thirty-three yards in another, in which respect it assimilates exactly to that of Rollrich; but what distinguishes this from all other Druidical remains of a similar nature, is the rectangular enclosure on the eastward side of the circle, including a space of about eight feet by four. The object of this is a matter of conjecture;—by some it is supposed to have been a sort of Holy of Holies where the Druids met, separated from the vulgar, to perform their rites, their divinations, or sit in council to determine controversies; others consider it to have been for the purposes of burial; probably it might have been intended for both.

The later 19th century saw an increase in research into Castlerigg stone circle. C W Dymond visited the circle in 1878 and 1881, from which visits he produced the first accurate plan of the stones. He marked the position of one of the internal cairns, showing that it was clearly visible at that time, but missed the other two cairns observed by Benjamin Williams in 1856 showing that these two features have never been clearly defined.

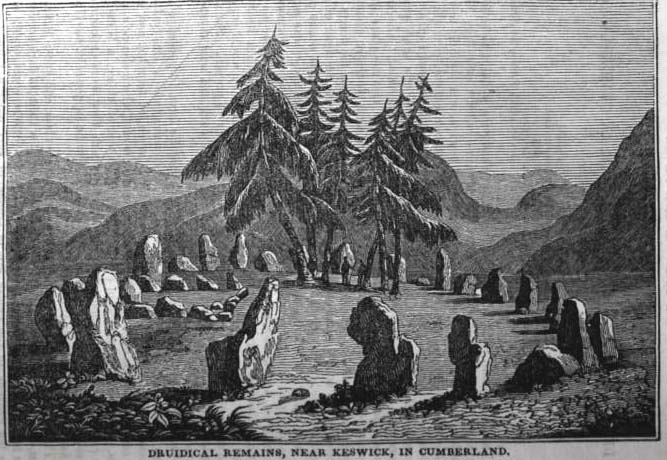
Druidical remains, near Keswick, Cumberland, by Robert Sears, 1843

Because excavation has been so limited, much interpretation of Castlerigg still depends heavily on surface observation, antiquarian plans, and comparison with other Neolithic monuments. The only known archaeological excavation at Castlerigg was carried out by W K Dover in 1882, one year before the site was scheduled. His excavation targeted the internal rectangular enclosure at the eastern side of the circle and his account of his excavation is brief and hidden within details of a day trip to the circle on 5 October 1882, by members of the Cumberland and Westmorland Antiquarian and Archaeological Society, which was published in 1883:

Prior to the visit of the Society some excavations had been made under the superintendence of Mr. W Kinsey Dover, with the view of finding whether the subsoil would disclose anything that might lead to some conclusion as to the age or object of the circle. The following is Mr. Dover's report: Length of inclosure within the Keswick stone circle, 22 feet, east and west; breadth, 11 feet, north and south. Length opened out, 18 feet to 19 feet; breadth, 3 feet 3 inches, with two cross cuts of about 2 feet. Depth of dark superficial soil to where the yellow undisturbed soil appears, 14 inches, with the exception of a small portion at the west end where the black soil mixed with stones continued to a depth of 3 feet. Near the bottom here, I found what I think to be a few small pieces of burned wood or charcoal, also some dark unctuous sort of earth, a sample of both I brought away. (Dover 1883, 505).

What subsequently happened to the samples of 'burned wood or charcoal' and the 'dark unctuous sort of earth' is unknown, other than they are now likely to be lost or, if not, too contaminated to be worth modern scientific analysis. Nevertheless, Dover's excavation is the only one to have been carried out at Castlerigg. It is, however, believed by some, based on the dimensions given by Dover, that if any stratigraphy exists within the rectangular enclosure it would not have been completely destroyed and the potential to create a relative sequence between the circle and the enclosure should still be possible. It is unlikely that further excavation around the stones would be permitted today as it is neither threatened by farming or development and erosion of the ground surface by the many visitors to the site is kept in check and is not sufficient to affect the integrity of the stones.

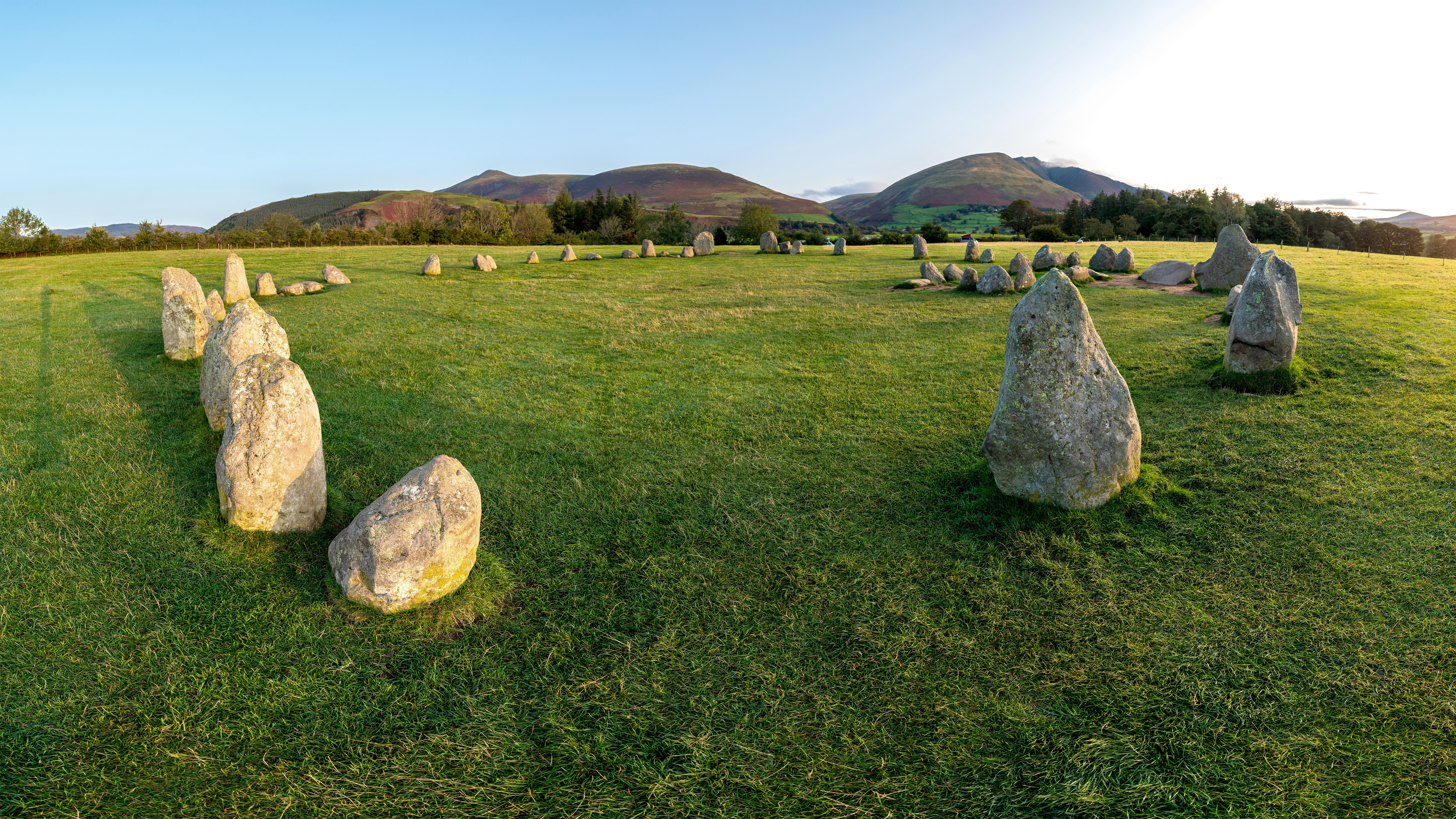
Castlerigg panorama, as seen from the south

== Recent research ==
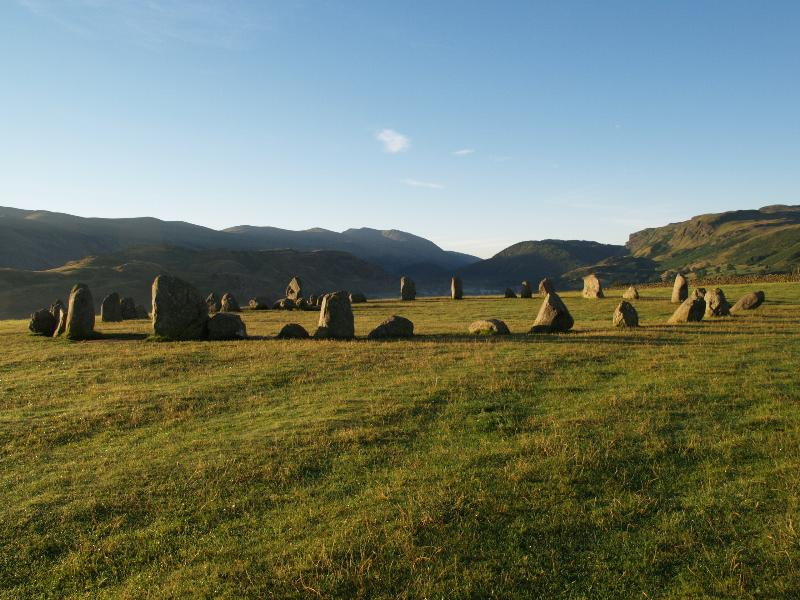
Castlerigg Stone Circle, April 2005

Much of our knowledge and understanding of Castlerigg stone circle has been passed down to us by the work of 18th-century antiquarians and 19th-century amateurs. Considering that the stone circles of Cumbria in general are of such antiquity, being among the earliest stone circles in the whole of Europe, it is surprising that so little work has been carried out here under modern conditions, and that none of the stone circles of Cumbria have so far been scientifically dated.

Since the 1960s, the names Aubrey Burl and Alexander Thom have become synonymous with stone circles and both men have contributed significantly to the literature on this subject, whilst taking opposing sides regarding their purpose and significance. The works of Burl strongly support the idea that any geometry within the circle, or astronomical alignments, are either purely coincidental or symbolic in nature. Thom, on the other hand, is a proponent of the circle builders being adept astronomers and mathematicians and suggests that these skills can be seen in all stone circles, everywhere. While neither Burl's nor Thom's works deal with Castlerigg exclusively, they do attempt to place all the stone circles of Britain in context to each other and to explain their purpose.

English Heritage subjected the scheduled area and the field to its immediate west to a geophysical survey in 1985 in order to improve our understanding of the stone circle and to provide a better interpretation for visitors. A full report of the findings from 1985 has still to be published.

In 2004, Margarita Díaz-Andreu, of the Department of Archaeology at Durham University, commissioned a survey of the stones at Castlerigg in response to claims that a "spiral carving" had been discovered there. A laser-scanning survey was used to record three-dimensional images of the stones. Only graffiti from more recent times was discovered and no trace of the alleged spiral was found.

== Pagan connections ==
Castlerigg has no discernible solar alignments. Nevertheless, it remains a popular site to visit during solstice celebrations. In recent years this has seen damage caused to the site, and illegal pits, from fires or cremation deposits, are often visible within the centre of the circle.

== Conservation history ==
Castlerigg stone circle was one of the monuments included in the Ancient Monuments Protection Act 1882, which included a 'Schedule' of 68 sites in Great Britain and Ireland. It thus became one of the first scheduled monuments. The following year the stone circle was 'taken in to state care'. Under the 1882 act a deed of guardianship could be entered into by a landowner, in which the monument, but not the land it stands on, becomes the property of the state. As one of the first such sites to enter into such an agreement it occupies a small place in the history of archaeological conservation. In 1913, Canon Hardwicke Rawnsley, one of the founders of the National Trust, was among the prime organisers of a public subscription which bought the field in which the stone circle stands, which he then donated to the National Trust. Responsibility for the stone circle remains with English Heritage, the successor body to the Ministry of Works, whilst ownership of the site is retained by the National Trust.
