= Langdale Boulders =

Pair of natural boulders in England

The Langdale Boulders
- Copt Howe
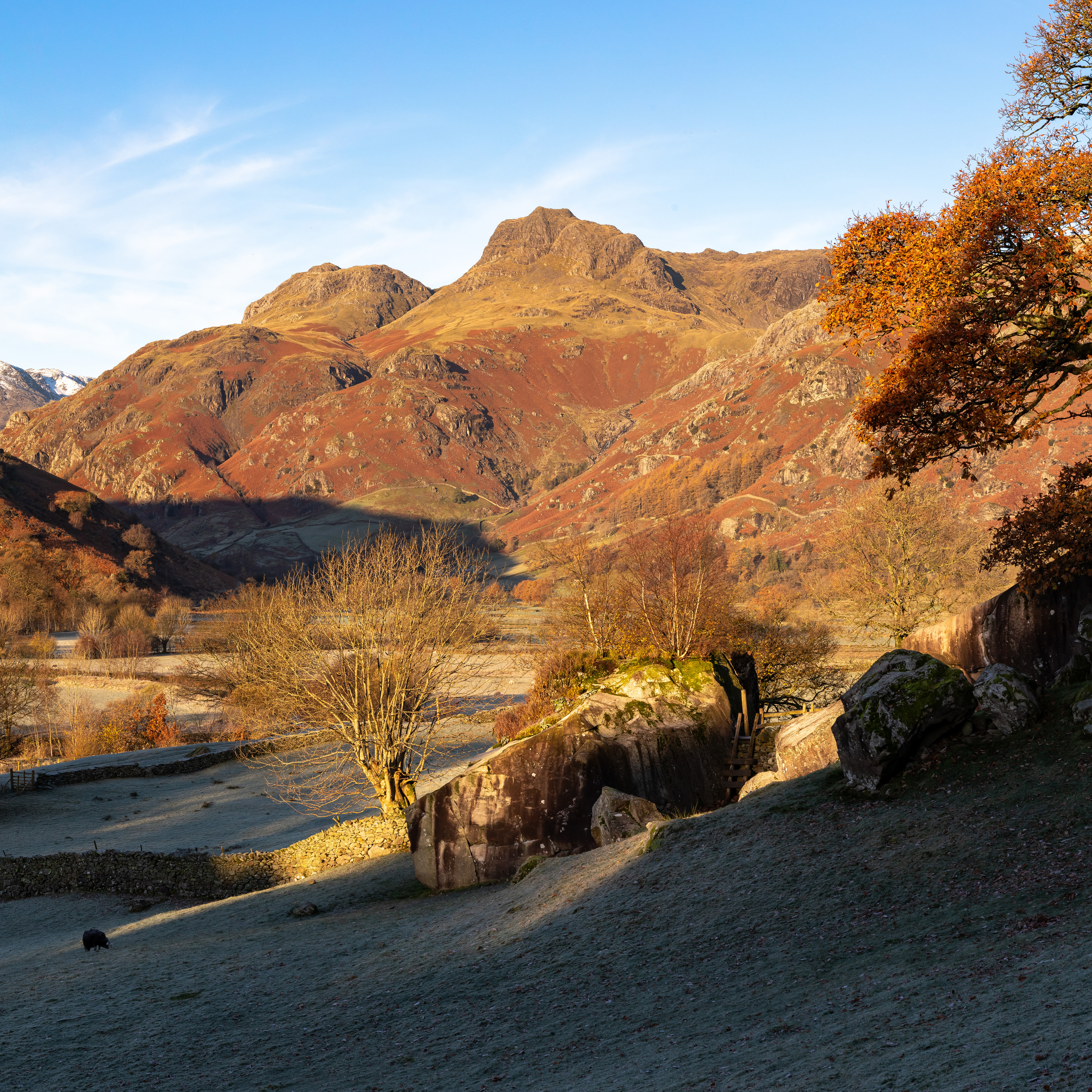
- The Langdale Boulders with the Langdale Pikes visible in the background to the northwest

- Langdale Boulders (Copt Howe)
- 54°26′36″N 3°03′34″W
- Type: Passage tomb
- Periods: Neolithic
- Location: England
- Region: Cumbria

History
- Built: c. 3200 BC

Site notes
- Owner: National Trust
- Public access: Accessible

Scheduled monument
- Designated: 24 November 2000
- Reference no.: 1019434

The Langdale Boulders are a pair of natural boulders at the southeastern end of the Langdale Valley, just northwest of Chapel Stile. They are also known locally as the "Copt Howe" boulders. The boulders are best known as the surface bearing England's largest and most complex assemblage of Neolithic rock carvings. These carvings remained unrecognised until their rediscovery in 1999.

Positioned with clear sightlines towards the Langdale Pikes, and possibly intentionally aligned to the summer solstice sunset behind Harrison Stickle, the site appears carefully embedded in a prehistoric landscape. The valley is also known for the Langdale axe factory.

"Howe" is derived from the Old Norse haugr, meaning a mound or burial barrow, a term widely used across northern England to denote ancient, often funerary, earthworks. Its presence in the name does not necessarily confirm the existence of a burial monument here, but it strongly suggests that later communities recognised the site as having an ancient character. The first element, "Copt," is less certain in origin, but is often linked to the Old English copp, meaning a top, summit, or rounded hill. Taken together, "Copt Howe" can be read as something like "the mound on the summit" or "the barrow-like hill," a name that reinforces the impression of elevation and antiquity.

== Form and style of the carvings ==
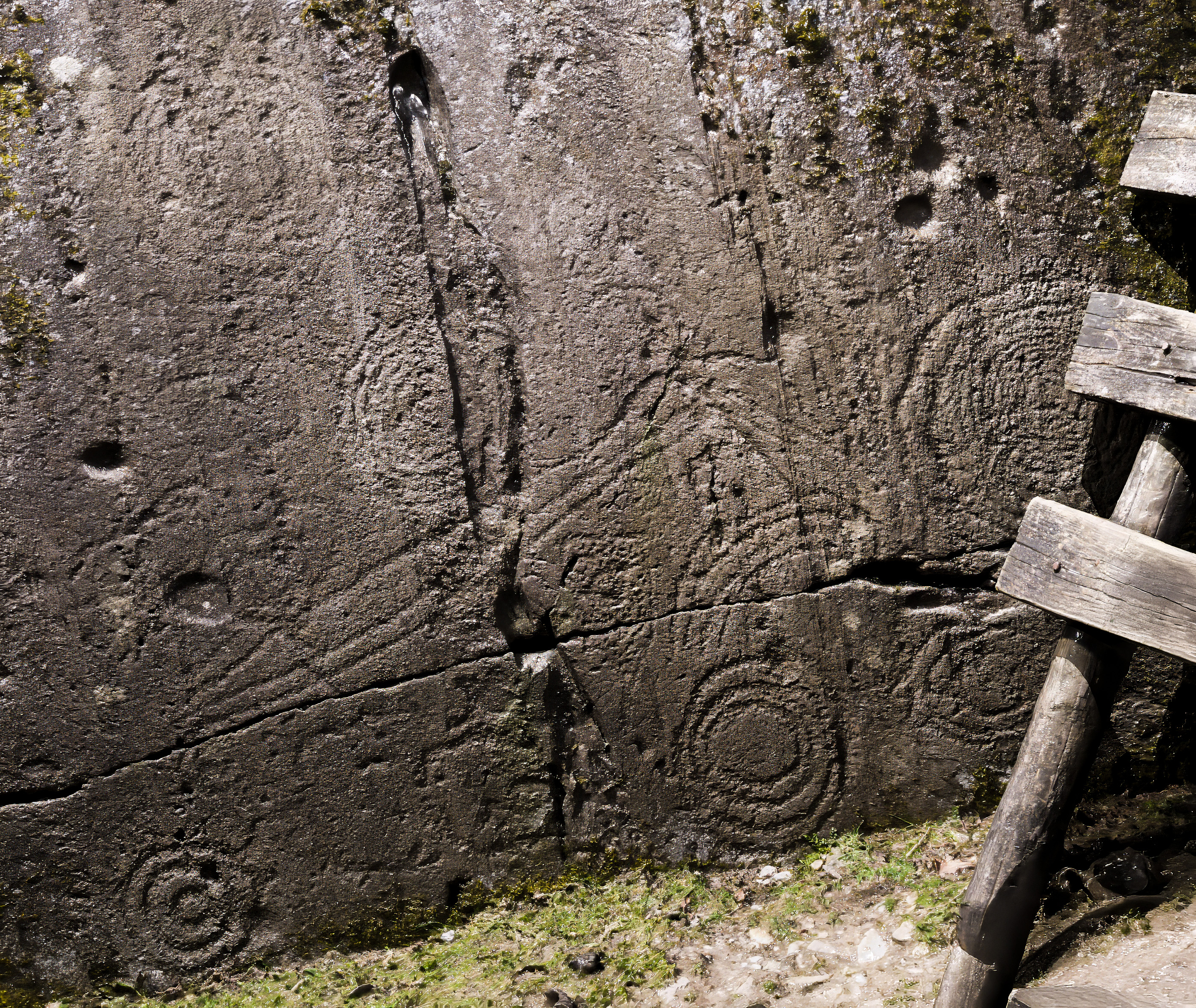
The main cluster of carvings on the Langdale Boulders

The carvings are frequently described as "cup and ring marks", a common category of Neolithic rock art distributed across Britain and much of Europe. However, this comparison is somewhat misleading. Classic cup-and-ring designs, common in areas such as Northumberland and Yorkshire, typically combine circular depressions with concentric rings.

However, although Copt Howe includes some ring-like shapes, they differ in scale and execution from their northeastern counterparts. The panel lacks cup marks altogether. Instead, it is dominated by incised lines and linear patterns, lending it a distinctive character within British prehistoric art.

Upon its rediscovery, some proposed a figurative interpretation - suggesting that part of the design represents the surrounding landscape, particularly the Langdale Pikes. Via this reading, a large circular motif may symbolise the sun setting behind peaks such as Pike of Stickle. If this interpretation holds, it raises the possibility that other elements of the carving also depict features of the local environment in stylised form.

== Connections to passage tomb art ==
Whether or not the carvings represent a type of map, there may be a connection to the wider landscape of the valley in the site's apparent solar alignment. When viewed through the natural gap between the Langdale Boulders., the summer solstice sunset appears behind Harrison Stickle.

In Ireland, passage tombs often align with solar events, allowing light to penetrate their inner chambers during key moments of the year.

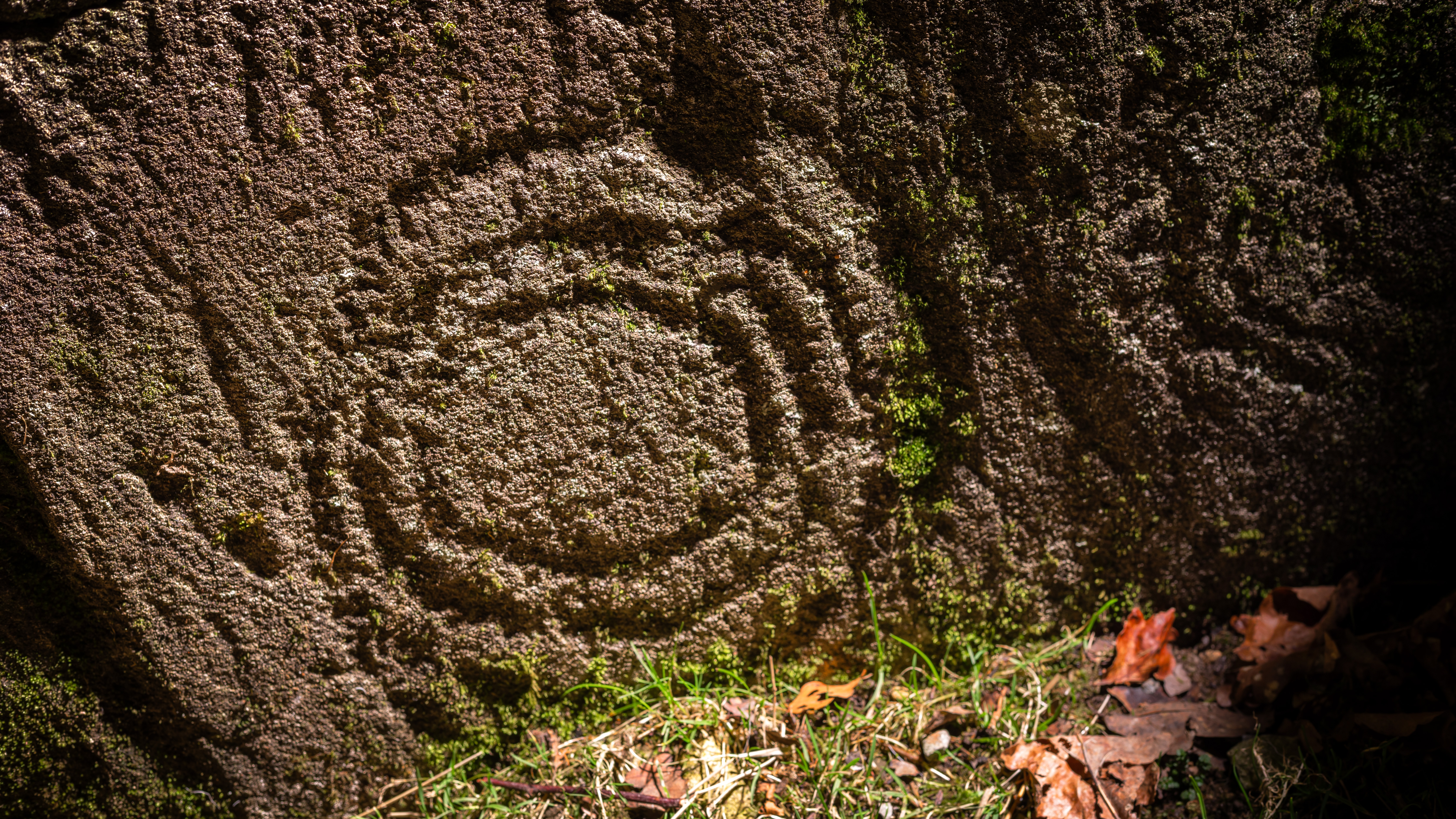
Three concentric circles carved into the Langdale Boulders

The carvings at Copt Howe bear a close resemblance to the art associated with Irish passage tombs. These monuments, constructed during the mid-to-late Neolithic (around 3200 BC), consist of earthen mounds containing stone-lined passageways leading to central burial chambers. The most famous example is Newgrange within the Brú na Bóinne complex.

The art found in such tombs often features spirals, rings, and linear designs carved into both interior stones and kerbstones surrounding the mound. These motifs are frequently interpreted as cosmological symbols, possibly linked to solar cycles. Such links are not entirely unexpected. During the Neolithic period, the Langdale region was a major centre for the production of stone axe heads, distributed widely across Britain and beyond. These exchange networks likely facilitated not only the movement of materials but also the spread of artistic styles and symbolic ideas, potentially explaining the presence of passage tomb–like motifs in Cumbria.

Although no constructed tomb survives at Copt Howe, the combination of rock art, artefacts, and landscape alignment strongly implies ceremonial or funerary activity during the Neolithic. Excavations led by Richard Bradley, Aaron Watson, and Peter Style in 2018. dated the carvings to approximately 3300 to 2900 BC. While no human burials were uncovered, the team did recover numerous stone tools at the base of the decorated surfaces, indicating human activity closely associated with the carvings.

== Importance and Neolithic transition ==
As the high-altitude quarries of the Langdale Pikes began to cease production around 3200 BC, the "Group VI" axe industry appears to have entered a period of terminal decline. Yet, as this industry slowed, the Cumbrian landscape saw the arrival of what the archaeologist Aubrey Burl dubbed "Cumbrian Circles": large, uncluttered megalithic enclosures such as Castlerigg, Swinside, Elva Plain, and Long Meg.

These, along with rock art like Copt Howe, may evidence a Neolithic Irish cultural drift across the sea. As seafaring communities moved eastward, importing new goods, and a new system of religion. The passage tomb art and intricate spirals found at sites like Copt Howe, Long Meg, and Little Meg, echo Irish passage tombs like Newgrange, Knowth, and Dowth.

== Access and conservation ==
There is parking nearby and the boulders are popular with the rock climbing community, although they are requested to keep off the carved faces.

The site has suffered damage in recent centuries, as quarrying over the past 400 years significantly reduced the size of the eastern boulder. The site was given a heritage listing, Scheduled Monument, in 2000. A drystone wall and wooden stile are excluded from the scheduling, although the ground beneath these features is included.

=== World Heritage Site ===
By designating the Lake District as a World Heritage Site in 2017, UNESCO added to the protection of the boulders. However, while the nomination recognised a cultural landscape shaped by human activity over millennia (which includes Neolithic evidence), the "Outstanding Universal Value" for which the Lake District was inscribed centred chiefly on pastoral landscape history, aesthetic influence, and conservation ideals rather than on its Neolithic sites themselves. Even so, the two boulders are mentioned in the supporting documentation along with the axe industry of Langdale and the valley's "long and well-documented history of agro-pastoral use".
