= Elva Plain Stone Circle =

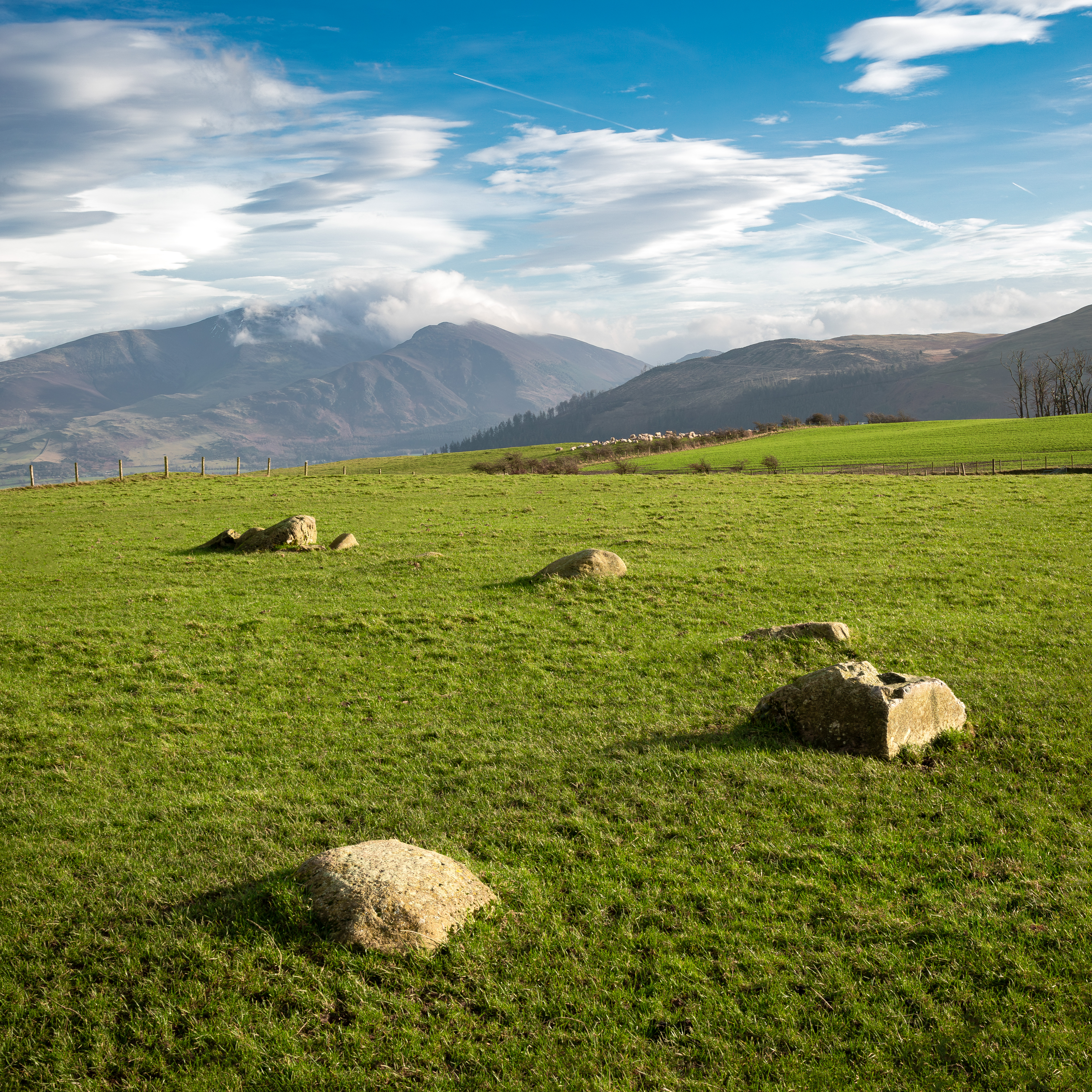
- Elva Plain Stone Circle

- Elva Plain Stone Circle
- 54°40′26″N 3°16′40″W
- Type: Stone circle
- Periods: Neolithic / Bronze Age
- Location: England
- Region: Cumbria

History
- Built: c. 3200 BC

Site notes
- Owner: Private

Scheduled monument
- Designated: July 20, 1995
- Reference no.: 1013385

Elva Plain Stone Circle is a prehistoric stone circle in Cumbria, England, located north of Bassenthwaite Lake on the lower slopes of Elva Hill. It is one of the largest surviving stone circles in Cumbria and is commonly classified as a "Cumbrian circle", that is, a regional group of large, widely spaced megalithic enclosures characterised by open internal space, prominent upland settings, and henge-like form.

The monument is generally dated to the mid-to-late Neolithic period (c. 3200–2500 BC), based on its morphology and comparison with other large British stone circles. It is accessible by footpath from the nearby road, though the approach is often boggy due to local ground conditions.

== Description ==
Elva Plain consists of a roughly circular arrangement of standing stones positioned on elevated ground overlooking the northern Lake District. Approximately fifteen stones survive, though the original monument is estimated to have contained around thirty. Many surviving stones are small, fallen, or partially embedded, suggesting either long-term stone loss or later disturbance.

The circle is notable for its broad diameter and uncluttered internal area, a characteristic shared with other major Cumbrian circles such as Castlerigg stone circle, Swinside, Long Meg and Her Daughters, and Gamelands. These monuments are often interpreted as large ceremonial enclosures designed to accommodate gatherings within the circle itself.

== Setting ==
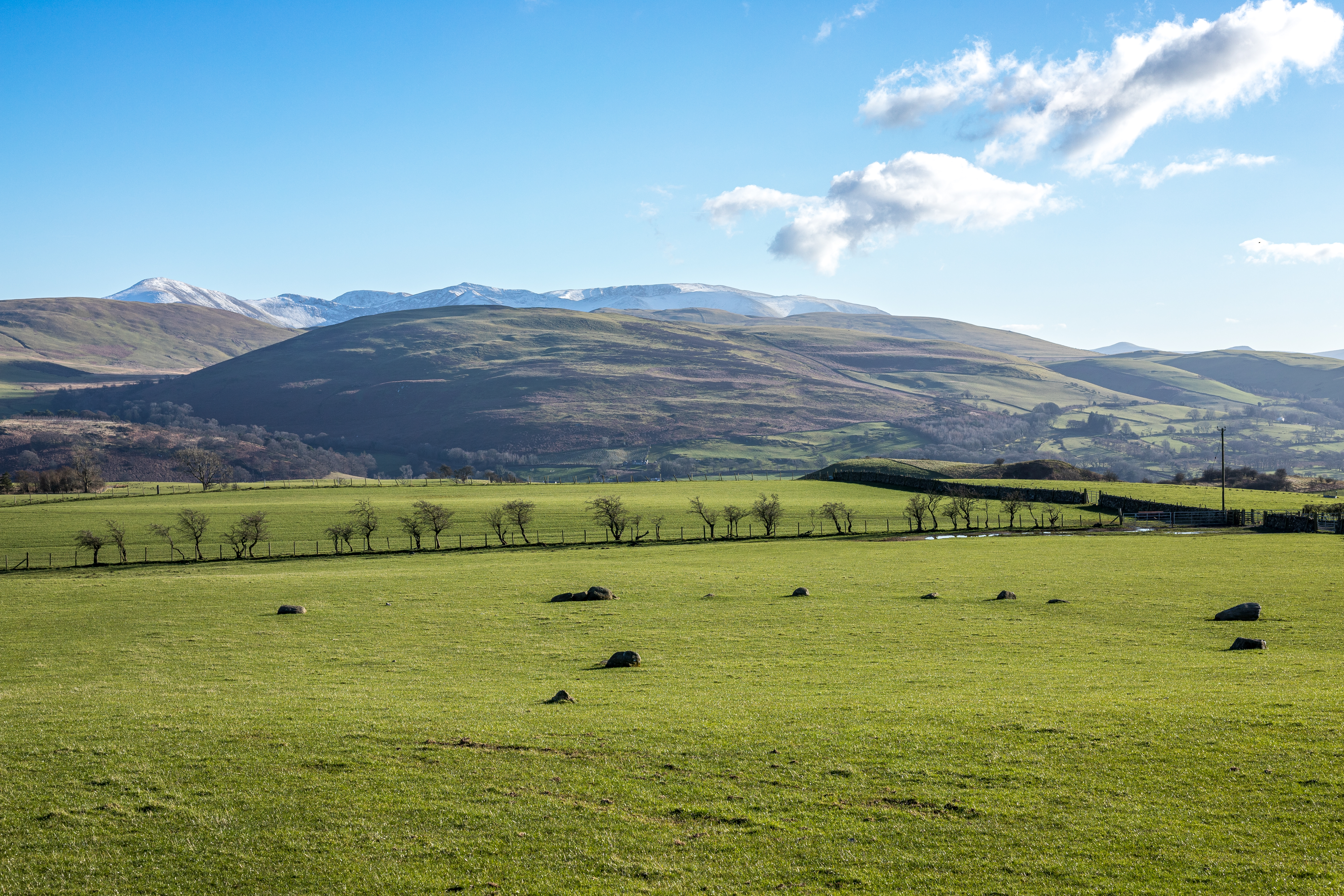
Elva Plain Stone Circle as seen from the hill to the north.

Like Castlerigg, Elva Plain occupies a visually prominent upland setting with extensive views of surrounding fells, including Grisedale Pike and Skiddaw. Landscape analysis has suggested that the monument sits within a natural amphitheatre formed by surrounding hills, with particular visual emphasis toward the southwest.

This southwestern orientation has led to suggestions that the circle may have been deliberately aligned with the winter solstice sunset. Nineteenth-century antiquarian accounts describe an outlying stone formerly located to the southwest of the main circle, although this stone was lost during the nineteenth century. If accurately recorded, its position may have marked the setting point of the midwinter sun behind the western horizon.

== Archaeological interpretation ==
The appearance of large stone circle enclosures in the Lake District appears to have coincided with a wave of Irish Passage Tomb culture across the west of Great Britain, with affinities to the Brú na Bóinne in eastern Ireland. Rock art reminiscient of this culture - dated to the mid-to-late Neolithic - is found across the Lake District, particularly associated with the Langdale Axe Factory, which quarried around a third of all known polished stone axes from Neolithic Britain. This culture appears to have swept up and down the coast of Great Britain, leaving megalithic stone circles and passage tombs in their wake.

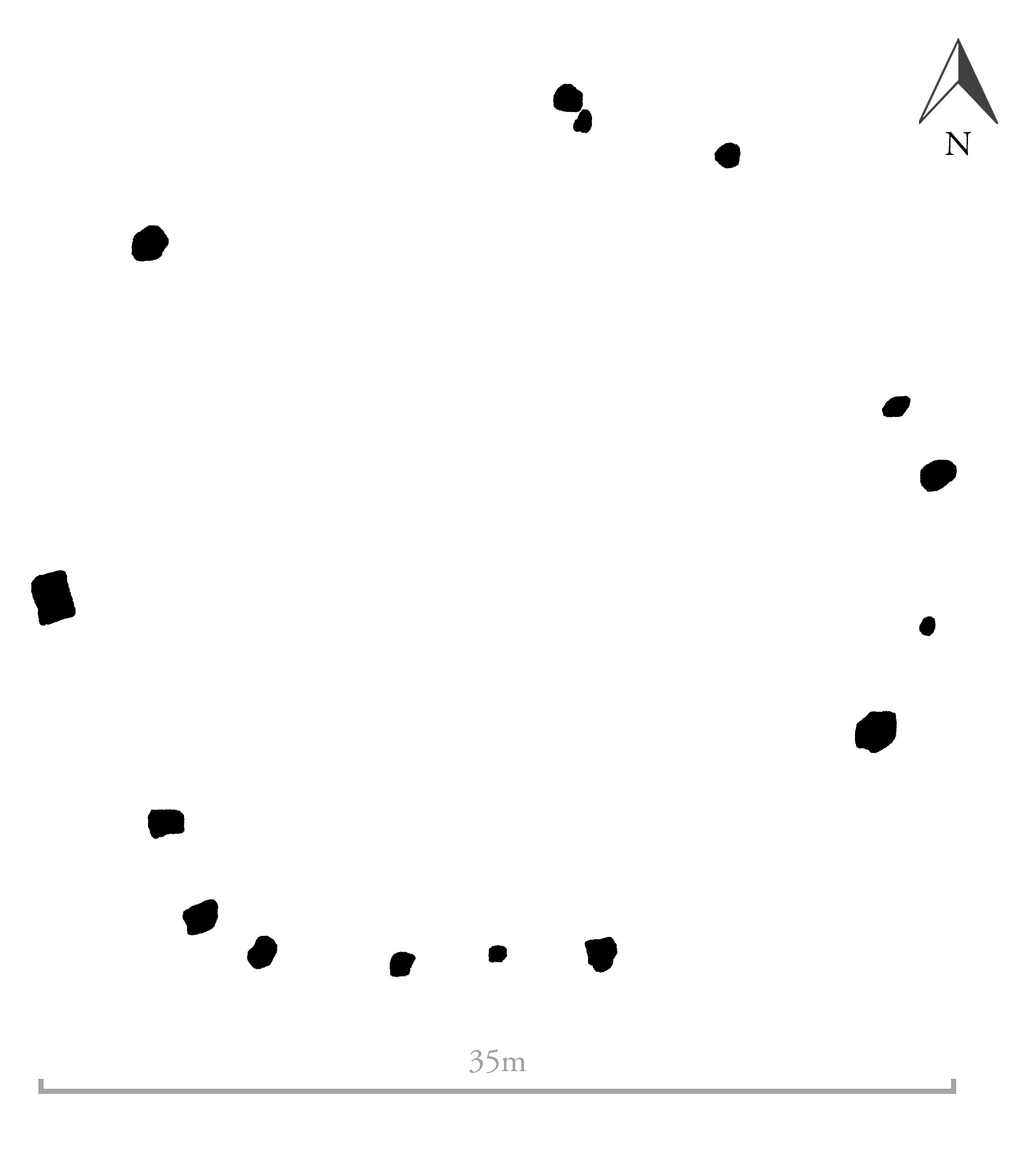
Diagram showing the plan of Elva Plain Stone Circle in the 21st century.

Aubrey Burl classed such circles as 'Cumbrian Circles': large, open stone enclosures spacious enough for gatherings. Although often thought widespread, true stone circles of this type are uncommon, with only five surviving in Cumbria: Swinside, Castlerigg, Elva Plain, Long Meg, and Gamelands. Others are also found locally, including the Twelve Apostles, the Girdle Stanes, and further to the north in Northumbria there are the Hethpool Stone Circles. Additional sites, such as the Rollright Stones and Stonehenge's bluestones, also adhere to this morphology. Such enclosures may have functioned as sacred settings for ritual, assembly, and perhaps astronomical observation, representing a local variety of henge, built in stone rather than earth.

Elva Plain is generally regarded as part of this wider tradition of large Neolithic ceremonial monuments. Its scale and form have led archaeologists to compare it to regional henge monuments such as those at Mayburgh Henge and King Arthur's Round Table, though unlike earthwork henges, it is defined by megalithic stones rather than banks and ditches.

Although the monument survives only partially, the surrounding field retains visible medieval ridge-and-furrow plough marks, indicating later agricultural use that may have sealed earlier archaeological deposits beneath the topsoil. This has led to suggestions that buried Neolithic features associated with the circle may survive below ground.

== Speculation and folklore ==
Some modern interpretations suggest that Elva Plain may have been associated with the exchange of Langdale axe heads produced in the central Lake District. However, no archaeological evidence currently supports this theory, and no Langdale axe artefacts have been recovered from the site.

The place-name Elva has occasionally been linked to the term elfshot, an antiquarian word for prehistoric arrowheads, though this etymology remains speculative.
