= Charles William Dymond =

English civil engineer and antiquarian

- Born: 4 August 1832; Heavitree, Exeter
- Died: 7 February 1915; Near Sawrey, Claife
- Occupation: Civil engineer
- Known for: Exploring Worlebury Camp

Charles William Dymond (4 August 1832 – 7 February 1915) was an English civil engineer and antiquarian.

== Family ==
Dymond was born on 4 August 1832 as the oldest child of William and Frances Dymond. His father was a schoolmaster.

On 11 July 1860, Dymond married Mary Esther Wilson. They had two children, Philip William Dymond (born 26 August 1862 at Bootle) and Helen Margaret Dymond (born 23 January 1864 at Bootle).

== Career ==
Dymond was a civil engineer. Dymond became a member of the Institution of Civil Engineers in 1870. He is remembered more for his antiquarian interests. From 1851 to 1852, he explored Worlebury Camp, an Iron Age camp in Somerset. He also took in interest in sites in North-West England. In 1901, he excavated Swinside Stone circle together with W. G. Collingwood, which he had already surveyed in 1872, and published a plan in the Journal of the British Archaeological Association.

He had an interest in Welsh culture and joined the Gorsedd of Bards of the Isle of Britain in 1899 under the name Adamant

Dymond died in Near Sawrey in 1915.

== Honours ==
=== UK ===
Dymond became a Fellow of the Society of Antiquaries of London in 1879. In 1900, he was elected Honorary Fellow of the Society of Antiquaries of Scotland.

=== France ===
He was elected member of the Société préhistorique française in 1909.

== Publications ==
He published treatises on prehistoric monuments and on religious issues.
