= Swinside =

Stone circle in Cumbria, England

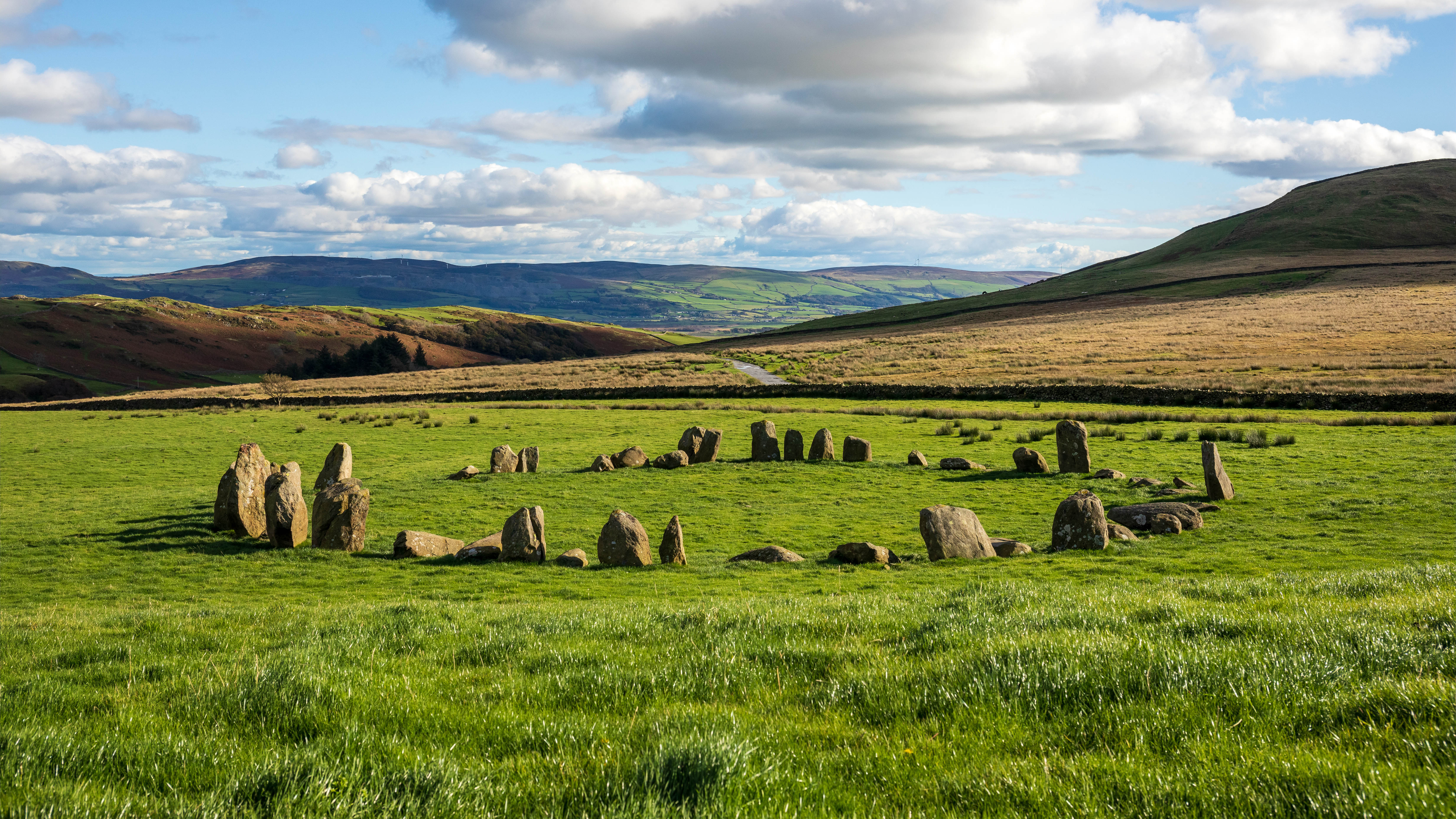
- The stone circle as seen from the north.

- Location in England, United Kingdom
- 54°16′57″N 3°16′26″W
- Type: Stone circle
- Location: England, United Kingdom

History
- Built: c. 3800 - 3200 BC

Site notes
- Material: Slate
- Diameter: c. 28.2 meters

Swinside, which is also known as Sunkenkirk and Swineshead, is a stone circle lying beside Swinside Fell, part of Black Combe in southern Cumbria, North West England.

In this period, the Lake District – a mountainous area in which Swinside is located – saw particularly high levels of stone circle construction, with other notable examples including the Castlerigg stone circle, Gamelands, Elva Plain, and Long Meg and Her Daughters. The original purposes of stone circles is still debated, although most archaeologists concur that they were built for ritual or ceremonial reasons.

Constructed from local slate, the ring has a diameter of 93 ft 8ins (26.8m), and currently contains 55 stones, although when originally constructed there probably would have been around 60. An entrance-exit was included on the monument's south-eastern side, which was defined by the inclusion of two outer portal stones.

In the Early Modern period, local folklore about the stones held that they had once been used in the construction of a church, but that the Devil continually thwarted these plans, creating the stone circle in the process. Archaeological investigation into the monument began in the early 20th century, with an excavation taking place in 1901.

== Location ==
The stone circle at Swinside is located in the south-west corner of the Lake District in the ancient district of Millom, 5 miles north of the town of Millom (map reference SD171881). There is no visitors centre or car park at the site, which can only be reached by travelling on foot. To reach the site, the visitor must get to Crag Hall, where there are limited places for parking, and then walk along a rough track for 2¼ km (1¼ miles) uphill towards Swinside Farm, where the megalithic ring lies to the right of the path.

The Millom Peninsula itself is home to several large Neolithic ceremonial henges, though none of these have survived into the modern day. At least nine crop mark henges have been identified from along this coastline since the 1980s, each with inner post hole circles that may have once held stone or timber circles. Adam Morgan Ibbotson named these the "Millom Lines", which along with Swinside, form an arching ritual landscape approximately 20 km around the Millom Peninsular – among the largest in the British Isles.

Archaeologist Aubrey Burl called Swinside "the loveliest of all the circles" in north-western Europe. In his study of the stone circles of Cumbria, archaeologist John Waterhouse commented that Swinside "can be compared only to Castlerigg and Long Meg and her Daughters in its visual impact; but its charm – for great charm it undoubtedly has – is greater even than theirs."

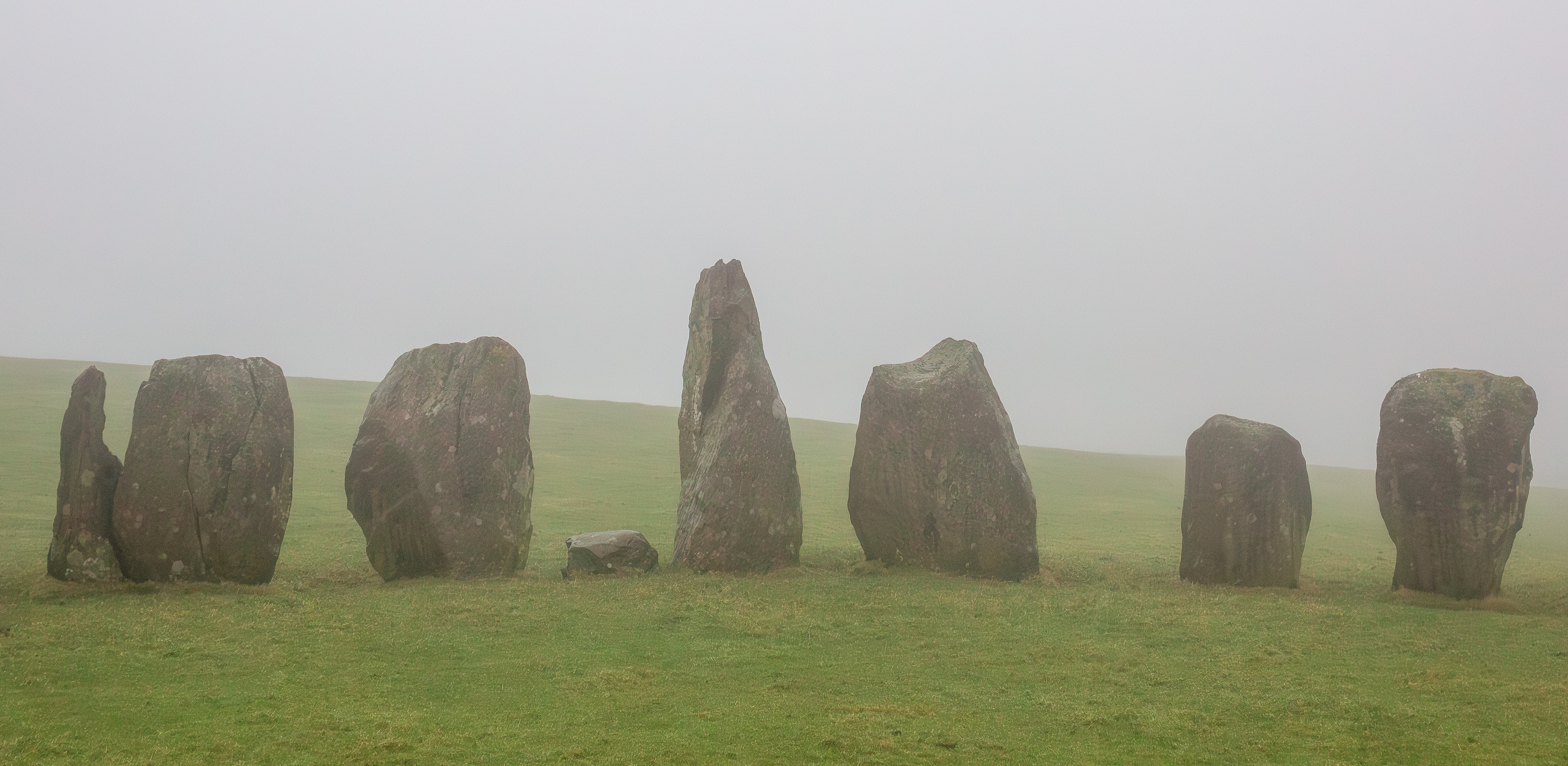
Swinside stone circle's stones in profile

== Background ==
During the Late Neolithic, British society underwent a series of major changes. Between 3800 and 3200 BC, Neolithic people appear to have largely ceased their continual expansion and cultivation of wilderness, and instead focused on settling and farming the most agriculturally productive areas of the island: Orkney, eastern Scotland, Anglesey, the upper Thames, Wessex, Essex, Yorkshire and the river valleys of the Wash.

This appears to have coincided with a wave of Irish Passage Tomb culture appearing across the west of Great Britain, with affinities with the Brú na Bóinne of eastern Ireland. Rock art reminiscent of this culture – dated to the mid to late Neolithic – is found across the Lake District, particularly associated with the Langdale axe factory, which quarried around a third of all known polished stone axes from Neolithic Britain. This culture appears to have swept up and down the coast of Great Britain, leaving megalithic stone circles and passage tombs in their wake.

The mid to late Neolithic also signalled what archaeologists have interpreted as a change in religious beliefs across Britain. Communities stopped building the large chambered tombs for the dead, and instead, they began the construction of large wooden and stone circles. The prominent megalithic-specialist and archaeologist Aubrey Burl (2000) argued that the change from building tombs to building open air rings signalled a change in religious belief for the peoples of north-western Europe. As he noted; "There was a change from the cramped, gloomy chamber or a tomb to the unroofed, wide ring, a change from darkness to light, from the dead to the living, from the grave to the sky."

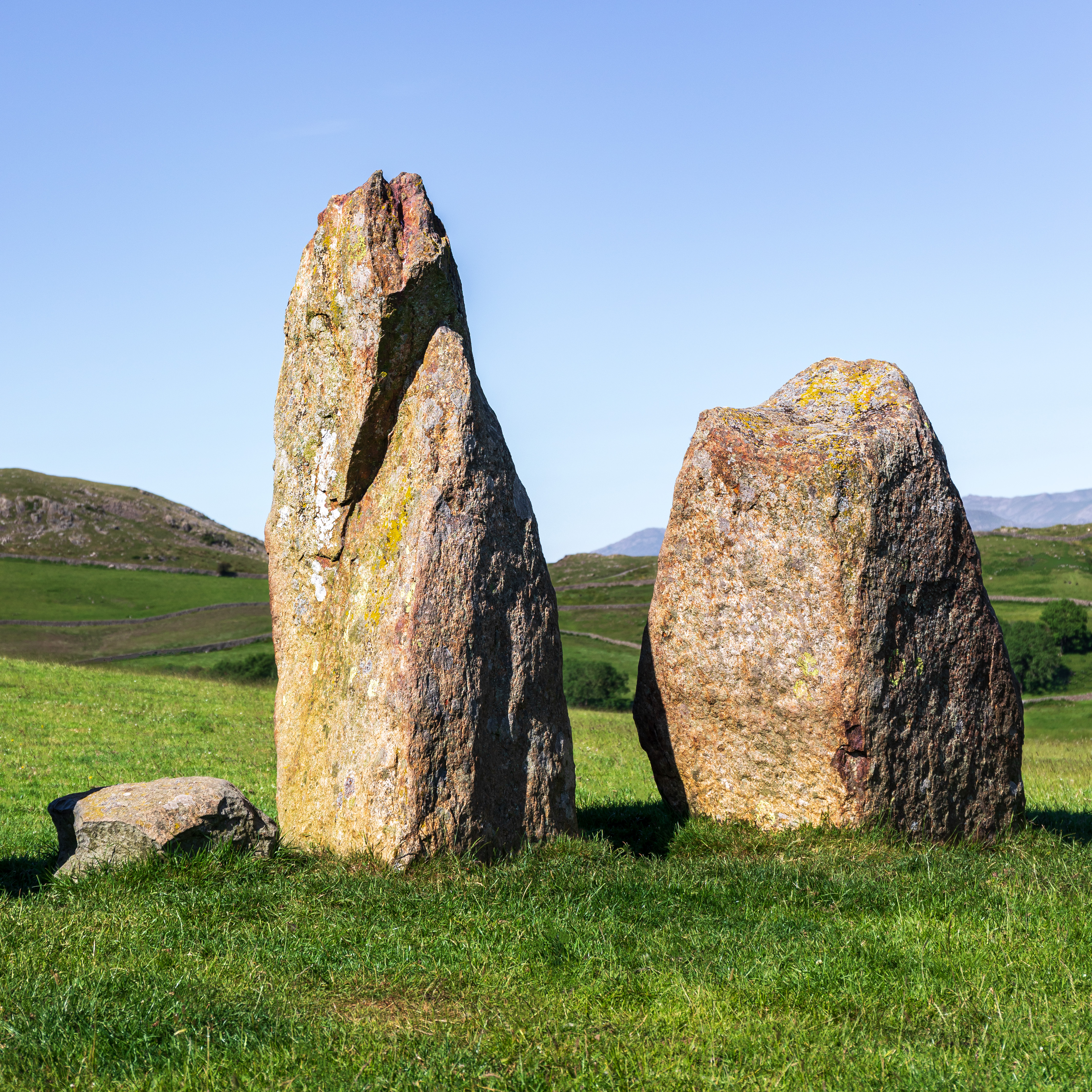
The tallest stone of Swinside stone circle

== Construction ==
The stones used in the construction of Swinside were porphyritic slate collected from the adjacent fells, and are of the type that was known locally as "grey cobbles" by the 20th century. The ring has a diameter of approximately 28.2 m, and it currently is formed of 55 stones. However, when originally constructed, there would have been at least 60.

Swinside's builders included a well defined entrance, 2.1 m (7 ft) wide, at the south-eastern side, which is defined by the placing of two large portal stones outside the circumference of the circle. Such portal openings can also be found at Long Meg and Her Daughters, 64 km to the northeast in the Eden Valley. There are further parallels, Swinside has many features similar to the Rollright Stones These features are also found at Stonehenge's bluestone circle.

Aubrey Burl classed such circles as "Cumbrian Circles": large, open stone enclosures spacious enough for gatherings. Although often thought widespread, true stone circles of this type are uncommon, with only five surviving in Cumbria: Swinside, Castlerigg, Elva Plain, Long Meg, and Gamelands. Others are also found locally, including the Twelve Apostles, the Girdle Stanes, and further to the north in Northumbria there are the Hethpool stone circles. Such enclosures may have functioned as sacred settings for ritual, assembly, and perhaps astronomical observation, representing a local variety of henge, built in stone rather than earth.

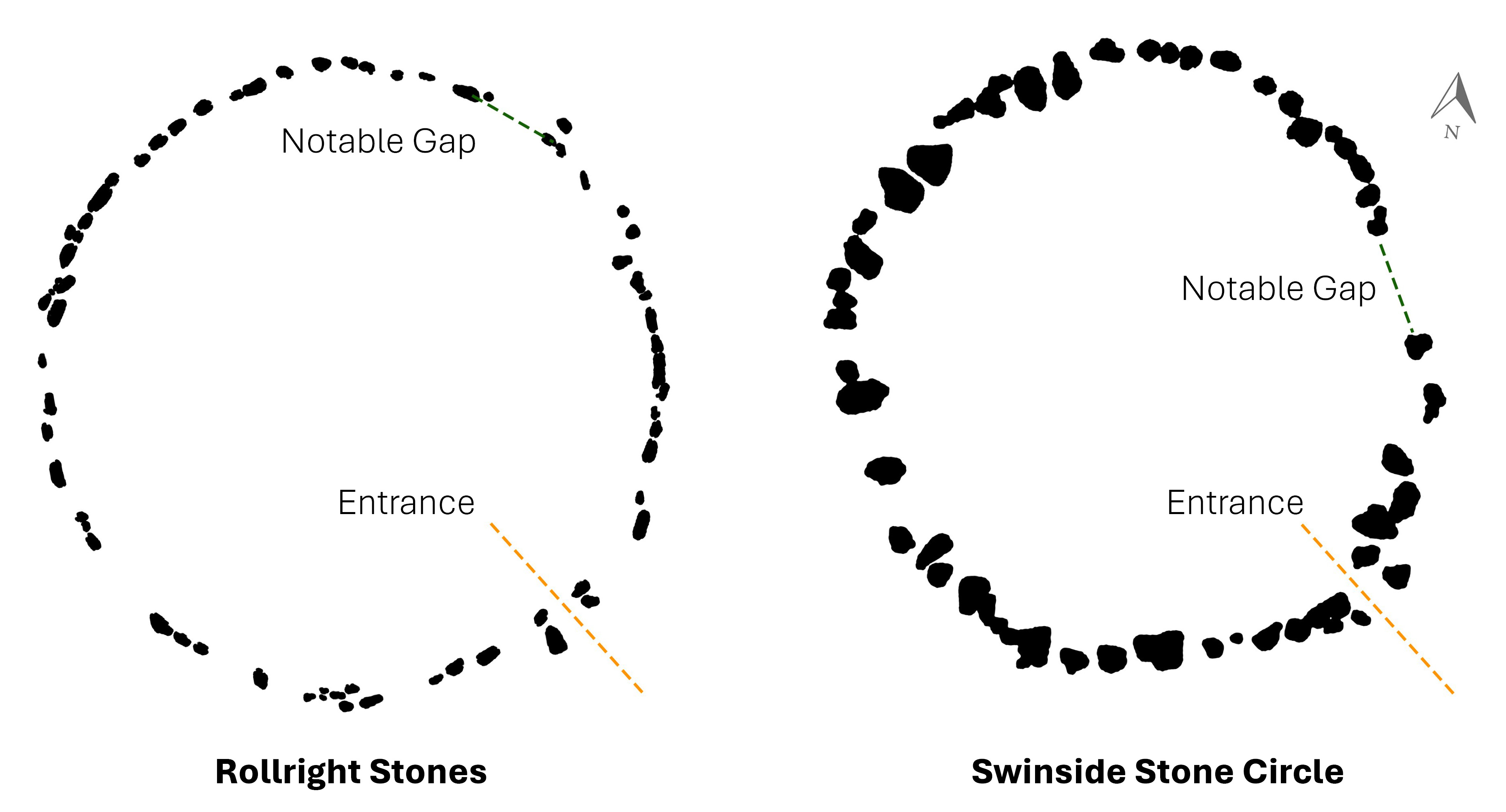
A diagram showing the similarities between Swinside and the Rollright Stones, Oxfordshire

== Folklore ==
Local folklore holds that at night, the Devil would pull down the stones of a church that was being constructed in the daytime, in the process creating the stone circle; it is for this reason that the site has also been called Sunkenkirk.

In the 1930s, it was recorded that there was a local belief that it was impossible to count all of the stones; a theory that is common for Cumbrian stone circles.

== Antiquarian and archaeological investigation ==
In 1901, the Cumberland & Westmorland Antiquarian & Archaeological Society sponsored the first archaeological excavation at Swinside. Under the direction of Charles Dymond and William Collingwood, the dig lasted from midday on Tuesday 26 March 1901 through to the evening of the following day. Two crosstrenches were dug, each 18 inches (45 cm) wide, covering just over one-thirteenth of the interior of the site. The excavators reported finding a lump of charcoal and a piece of decayed bone as well as some modern coins in the turf layer.

== See also ==
- Birkrigg stone circle, 12 miles to the southeast
- Grey Croft stone circle, 12 miles to the northwest
