= Countless stones =

Megalithic motif

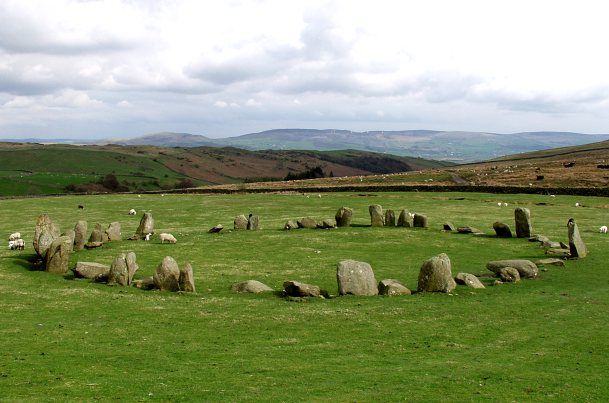
Swinside stone circle, in the English Lake District, has a countless stones tale associated with it.

The countless stones is a motif that appears in English and Welsh folklore. It is associated with various megalithic monuments, including chambered long barrows from the Early Neolithic and the stones circles of the Late Neolithic and Early Bronze Age. The motif holds that an individual attempting to count the number of stones in the monument will be unable to do so.

The earliest textual accounts of the story date from the late sixteenth century, where it is linked to the stone circle of Stonehenge in Wiltshire. Multiple sources from the seventeenth-century also link the story to Stonehenge, although also apply it to The Hurlers in Cornwall and Long Meg and Her Daughters in Cumberland (now Cumbria).

The countless stones motif was the subject of a study by folklorist S. F. Menefee, published in the Folklore journal in 1975, and was part of Leslie Grinsell's catalogue of folkloric motifs associated with prehistoric sites in Britain.

== Historical development ==
=== Early Modern accounts ===
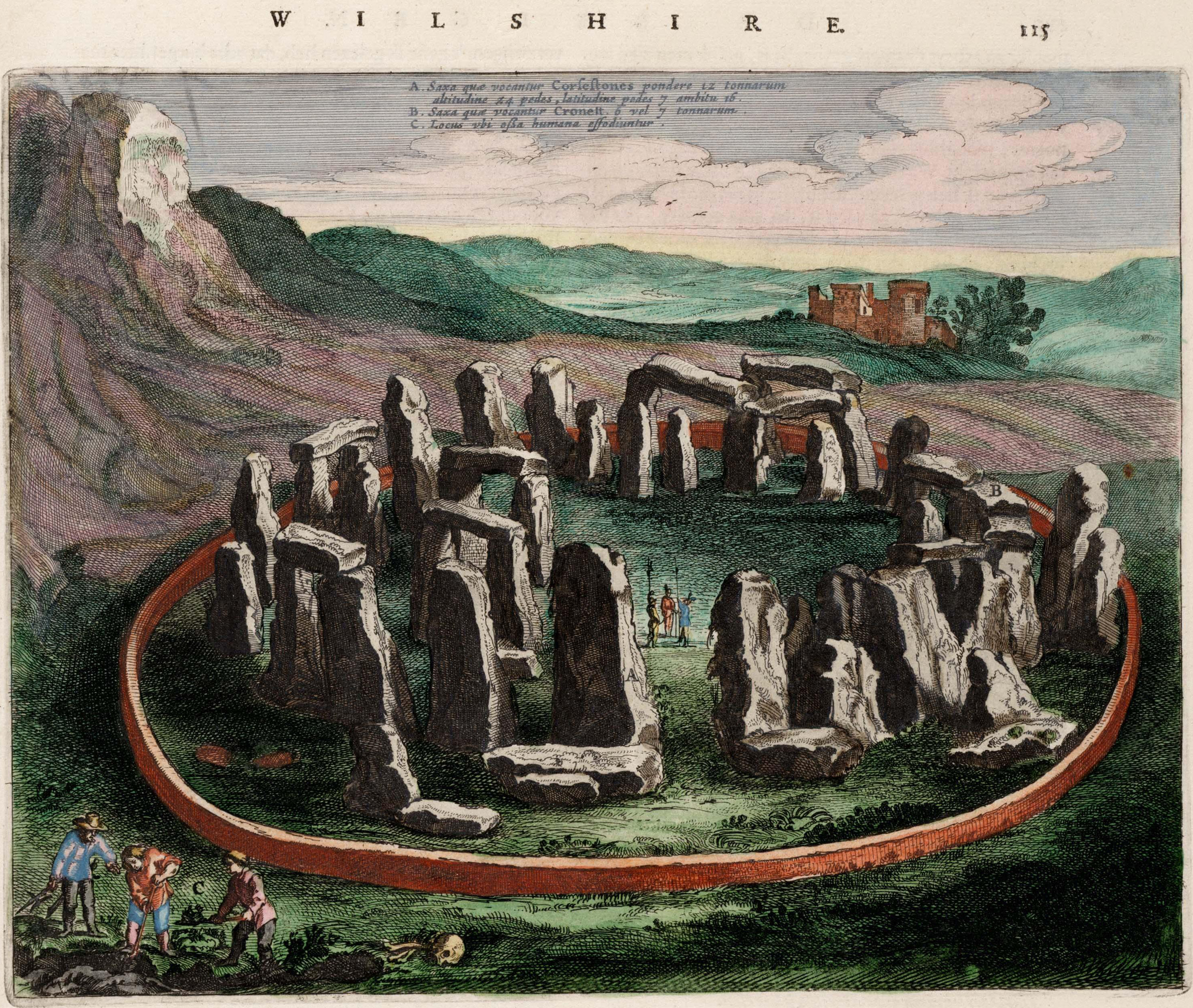
The circle of Stonehenge, depicted here in a 1645 illustration, has been associated with the story since at least the 16th century.

The earliest textual reference to the countless stones story comes from Philip Sidney's The 7 Wonders of England, which was written prior to 1586. Sidney related the story when discussing the stone circle of Stonehenge in Wiltshire, commenting "Neere Wilton sweete, huge heapes of stones are found, But so confusde [sic] that neither any eye, Can count them just." The second oldest known account was produced by Richard Carew for his book, The Survey of Cornwall, which was published in 1602 and probably authored in manuscript form between 1590–94. Carew was aware of the tradition at Stonehenge, comparing it with that found at The Hurlers, a group of three stone circles near Liskeard in Cornwall.

A further textual appearance of the story dates from 1604, and can be found in the Scottish poet Alexander Craig's book The Poetical Essays of Alexander Craige Scotobritane. Here, it features in reference to Stonehenge as part of the poem "To His Calidonian Mistris". The Stonehenge countless stones story is again mentioned in William Rowley's play The Birth of Merlin, which was published in 1662 but probably authored forty of fifty years previously.

On 7 October 1651, the British monarch Charles II visited Stonehenge, where he counted the number of stones. There, one of those who were accompanying him, Colonel Robert Phelips, commented that "the King's Arithmetike gave the lye to that fabulous tale". Around the same time, a number of other individuals decided to count the stones, including Inigo Jones, John Evelyn, and Samuel Pepys, thus suggesting that they were familiar with the story. The tale was next recorded in the journal of Celia Fiennes, who visited Stonehenge in about 1690; elsewhere in her journals, Fiennes also recorded it among local people living in the vicinity of the stone circle of Long Meg and Her Daughters in Cumberland.

== Subtypes ==
In their study of the countless stones story, S. F. Menefee divided the recorded tales into three sub-types. Menefee insisted that these categories "should not be regarded as rigid and exclusive, but rather as divisions which may better help us to understand the belief as a whole." Menefee's categories are:

1. that the stones could move at will
2. that the difficulty was due to the 'Devil's tricks'
3. that 'there is some sort of spell on them'

== Modern influence ==
Ethan Doyle White argued that at the Rollright Stones, the tale of the countless stones exerted an influence on practitioners of the contemporary Pagan religion of Wicca in the mid-20th century. He highlighted that Wiccans such as Doreen Valiente were aware of the folklore of the site, and that it influenced them in choosing the prehistoric monument as a sacred site for their own magico-religious practices, which were taking place there by the late 1950s.

== Associated megalithic monuments ==
A list of sites with which the motif has been associated can be found in Grinsell.

- Stonehenge, Wiltshire (1586)
- The Hurlers, Cornwall (1602)
- Long Meg and Her Daughters, Cumbria (c. 1690)
- Stanton Drew, Avon (1749)
- Little Kit's Coty House, Kent (mid-19th century)
- Rollright Stones, Oxfordshire (1853)
- Meini Cyvriol, Cardiganshire (1856)
- Y Naw Carreg, Carmarthenshire (1917, although site destroyed 1915)
- Swinside, Cumbria (c. 1939)
- Coldrum Long Barrow, Kent (1946)
