= Grasmere prehistoric rock art =

Cluster of Neolithic carved rocks in Cumbria, England

Prehistoric rock art at Grasmere and Rydal
- Prehistoric cup-marked rock panel at Rydal Hall

- Location within Great Britain
- 54.461094°N 3.021350°W
- Type: Open-air cup-and-ring and petroglyph panels
- Location: Grasmere and Rydal, Cumbria, England

History
- Built: c. 4000–2350 BC

Site notes
- Governing body: National Trust (Allan Bank); Westmorland and Furness Council (Broadgate Park); Private land (Rydal Hall)

The prehistoric rock art at Grasmere and Rydal comprises a cluster of open-air Neolithic carved rock panels situated within the Rothay valley in Cumbria, North West England. Located inside the Lake District National Park, the carvings are found at: Broadgate Park in the centre of Grasmere village, the parkland and adjoining pasture at Allan Bank, and the lower valley slopes south of Rydal Hall. A further high-level cup-marked boulder lies on the eastern valley flank between Alcock Tarn and Dunney Beck.

The carvings are characteristic of the region, and are associated with several monuments and activities of the Early Neolithic period.

== Description of the panels ==
=== Broadgate Park (Broadgate Meadow) ===
Located in the centre of Grasmere village at the southern corner of the Broadgate Meadow recreation ground (NY 33890 07782), immediately adjacent to the National Trust car park and sheltered beneath an oak tree behind a boundary hedge, the Broadgate Park outcrop is one of the largest open-air canvases of prehistoric rock art in North West England.

First identified in June 2006, the panel occupies a prominent, glacially smoothed bedrock exposure sloping gently toward the valley floor. The upper surface is decorated with an extensive scatter of pecked cup-marks measuring between 2 cm and 10 cm in diameter (the majority falling between 3 cm and 5 cm), accompanied by a series of cup-and-ring marks. The carvings are intersected by a dense criss-cross network of natural glacial striae and structural rock fissures, a characteristic feature of Cumbrian open-air rock art where pre-existing natural cracks were frequently incorporated into the visual composition of the panel.

The Neolithic carvings at: Top: Broadgate Park / Bottom: Allan Bank

=== Allan Bank and Underhelm Farm ===
Approximately 500 metres west-southwest of Broadgate Park, a group of three intervisible rock art panels is situated across the lower parkland of Allan Bank and the adjoining pasture of Underhelm Farm, overlooking the western side of Grasmere village.The group comprises two parkland boulders/outcrops and a prominent crag overlooking the valley floor:

- Allan Bank Parkland Boulder (NY 33425 07664): Documented in a 2012 survey by Jamie Quartermaine of Oxford Archaeology North, this panel is situated on a flat-topped, earthfast boulder in low-lying parkland south-east of Allan Bank house. The summit of the boulder bears multiple discrete groupings of pecked hemispherical cup-marks. Over half of the boulder's upper surface has historically been encroached upon by turf and moss cover.
- Allan Bank North-West Panel (NY 33418 07676): Situated immediately north-west of the main parkland boulder, comprising a further group of pecked Neolithic cup-marks on exposed rock.
- Underhelm Farm Crag (NY 33468 07571): Situated 150 metres south-east of Allan Bank on a smooth natural bedrock crag overlooking Grasmere village. In addition to simple cup-marks, the crag features a complex motif identified in only two other archaeological contexts: the carved boulders at Copt Howe in the adjacent Great Langdale valley, and the passage tomb art of the Boyne Valley in Ireland (specifically Newgrange, Knowth, and Dowth).

Evidence of Early Neolithic activity has been recovered from the immediate area of the Allan Bank panels. A Group VI (Langdale volcaniclastic tuff) pointed-butt rough-out stone axe was recovered from a drystone wall at nearby Crag House, and in 2019 a worked yellow-brown flint tool or flake was discovered protruding from animal-disturbed ground directly at the base of the part-quarried rock art outcrop.

=== Rydal Hall ===
Approximately 3.5 kilometres (2.2 mi) south-east of the Grasmere panels, the rock art tradition continues along the eastern side of the valley south of Rydal Hall (NY 369 061). Situated on private farmland below the western slopes of Nab Scar and Rydal Fell, the Rydal panel occupies a low-lying, glacially smoothed bedrock outcrop.

The Rydal Hall outcrop is decorated with an open scatter of simple pecked cupules distributed across the glacially abraded upper surface. Like the Broadgate Park and Allan Bank boulders, the carvings lack the deeply incised concentric rings typical of Pennine rock art.

=== Alcock Tarn / Dunney Beck ===
Between the Grasmere and Rydal valley-floor clusters, an upland cup-marked stone is recorded on the eastern valley flank between Alcock Tarn and Dunney Beck (NY 34971 07638). Discovered in 2010, the boulder sits along the elevated contour route overlooking both Grasmere and Rydal Water.

Site name	Grid reference	Principal motifs
Broadgate Park (Broadgate Meadow)	NY 33890 07782	Dense scatter of cup-marks, cup-and-ring marks
Allan Bank Parkland Boulder	NY 33425 07664	Grouped pecked cup-marks on summit of flat-topped earthfast boulder
Allan Bank North-West Panel	NY 33418 07676	Pecked cup-marks on exposed rock surface
Underhelm Farm Crag (Allan Bank SE)	NY 33468 07571	Cup-marks and complex Langdale / Boyne Valley passage tomb motif
Alcock Tarn / Dunney Beck	NY 34971 07638	Cup-marked boulder on eastern valley flank
Rydal Hall	NY 369 061	Open scatter of cup-marks on glacially smoothed outcrop

== Archaeological context and interpretation ==
=== Affinities with similar sites ===
A wall along Pye Lane, Grasmere, which holds many large boulders. Potentially from the demolished stone circle described by John Hodgson in 1810.

The Lake District is known to have several examples of simple cup mark motifs associated with Early Neolithic activity. These are primarily glacially polished whaleback outcrops decorated with clusters of simple cups (ranging from fewer than five to over a hundred per panel), the panels at Grasmere closely mirror sites at Little Langdale (NY 3170 0380), Side Pike (NY 2865 0560), and Beckstones, Ullswater (NY 403 150).

Additionally, the presence of the complex motif at Underhelm Farm, may link the village directly to the monumental carved boulders at Copt Howe (NY 3140 0583) in Great Langdale, located 3.1 kilometres (1.9 mi) to the south-west. Excavated and recorded in 2018–2019, Copt Howe features concentric circles, chevrons, and angular motifs characteristic of Irish passage grave art in the Boyne Valley (Newgrange, Knowth, and Dowth, c. 3200–3000 BC).

=== The lost stone circle of Grasmere ===
The density of Neolithic rock art in Grasmere may also relate to a now-vanished megalithic monument at the northern exit of the village. In his 1810 work A Topographical and Historical Description of the County of Westmorland, the antiquarian Reverend John Hodgson recorded a partially demolished stone circle at the road junction leading north toward Dunmail Raise and Keswick:

There are smaller heaps of stone on the south side of Raisbeck, and where the road turns off from Keswick to the village of Grasmere is an ancient monument consisting of several large stones in a circular form, but many of them have been displaced to make room for the roads.
