= Worlebury Camp =

Iron Age hillfort in Somerset, England

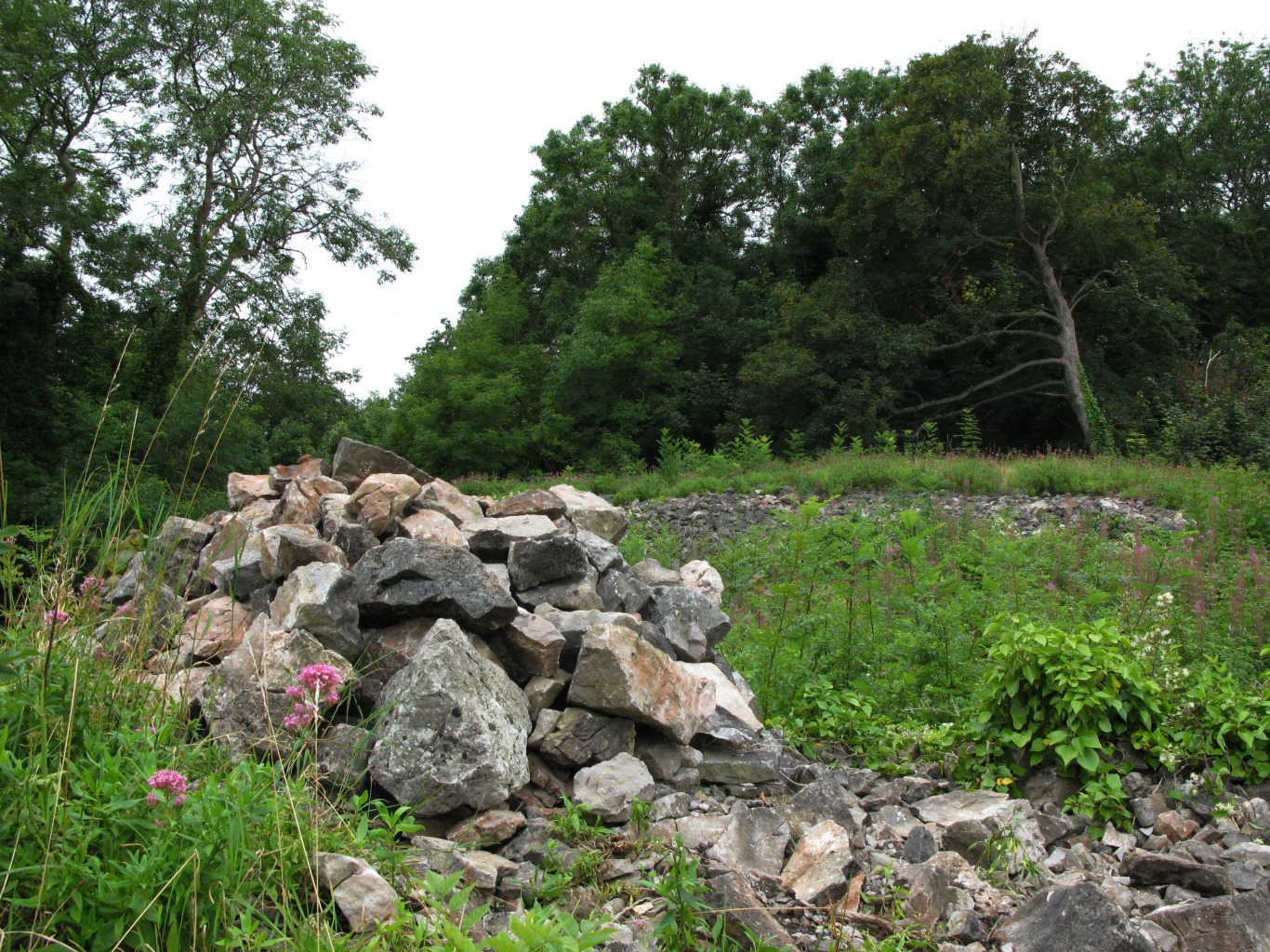
- A picture of the present-day site

- Worlebury Camp shown within Somerset
- 51°21′27″N 2°59′12″W
- Location: North Somerset, Somerset, England

History
- Built: During the Iron Age

Site notes
- Architectural style: British pre-Roman Architecture

Scheduled monument
- Official name: Worlebury Camp: a large multivallate hillfort on Worlebury Hill
- Designated: 22 February 1915
- Reference no.: 1011260

Worlebury Camp (or Worlebury Hillfort) is the site of an Iron Age hillfort on Worlebury Hill, north of Weston-super-Mare in Somerset, England. The fort was well defended with numerous walls, embankments and ditches around the site. Several large triangular platforms have been uncovered around the sides of the fort, lower down on the hillside. Nearly one hundred storage pits of various sizes were cut into the bedrock, and many of these contained human remains, coins, and other artefacts. During the 19th and 20th centuries the fort suffered damage and was threatened with complete destruction on multiple occasions. Now, the site is a designated Scheduled monument. It falls within the Weston Woods Local Nature Reserve which was declared to Natural England by the North Somerset Council in 2005.

== History ==
Animated LIDAR data of Worlebury Camp

In The Ancient Entrenchments and Camps of Gloucestershire, Edward J. Burrow mentions that probably either the Goidel or Brython people had initially built the Worlebury Camp. The Belgae people subsequently overthrew the initial inhabitants and occupied the camp for a while, but they were subsequently eliminated at the hands of the Romans.

Worlebury Camp has been explored at various times over a period of 150 years. From 1851 to 1852, Charles Dymond, Edwin Martin Atkins, and Francis Warre excavated and surveyed the Worlebury Camp. Dymond returned in 1880 to continue the excavation, which lasted until 1881. Another century passed before the Woodspring Museum from Weston-super-Mare excavated more of Worlebury camp in 1987 to 1988. Finally, in 1998, the Avon Extensive Urban Study team performed the latest (as of 2008) assessment of the site.

A condition survey undertaken in 2017–18 resulted in a request for an analytical earthwork survey which was undertaken by Historic England in 2018–19. While the survey disclosed some evidence about the use of the hillfort and its later history, many questions still remain.

== Location ==
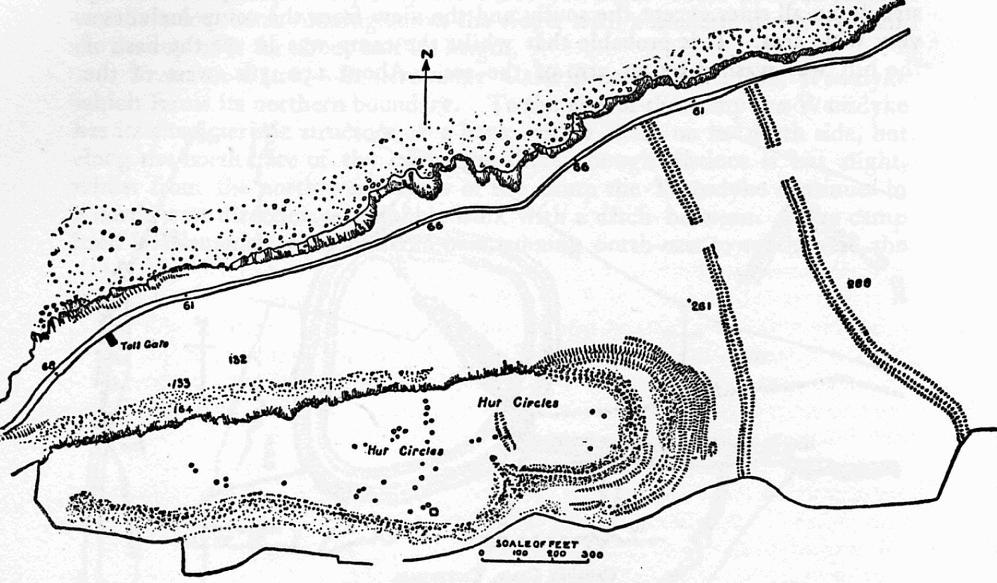
Plan of the camp

The fort is located on the summit of Worlebury Hill, 109 metres (358 ft) above sea level. It is in the present-day North Somerset, above the seaside resort of Weston-super-Mare and close to the village of Worle.

Its inhabitants would have had a view of the countryside as well as any potential invaders. They would have been able to see out over to Sugar Loaf Mountain, the Black Mountains, the Mendip Hills, Dunkery Beacon, Sand Point, and Wales. This view is no longer as unobstructed as it once was because of the presence of so many trees spread over the hill.

== Archaeological findings ==
=== Platforms ===
There are a number of triangular platforms on the slopes around the fort. The apexes of these triangles are flush with the hillside, with the base projecting in the downhill direction. However, the upper surface is approximately level. The front faces of these platforms are about 1.7 metres (5.6 ft) above the hillside, and they have ditches in front of them to improve their defence. In a letter to Warre, Atkins theorised that the structures were slingers' platforms or archers' stations. Several sling stones have been found around them, offering some credence to the theory that slingers stood upon these platforms. Dymond mentions the stones in his book:

Several of them were broken, as though they had been used in the attack [on the fort], as, indeed, many of them probably were.

— Charles Dymond, Worlebury: An Ancient Stronghold in the County of Somerset

=== Walls and ditches ===
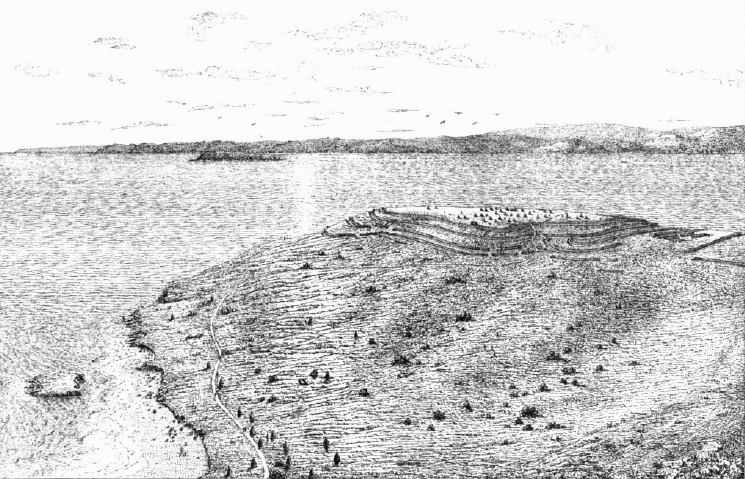
An artist's rendition of Worlebury Camp from a book published in 1886

Worlebury Hill is bordered on its northern and western sides by steep cliffs dropping down into the Bristol Channel between Weston Bay and Sand Bay. These would have rendered the fort nearly immune to attack from those directions. Nevertheless, the fort still has one wall on its northern side and one on its western side, both very near the edge of the cliffs. On the south side, a single rampart and a ditch guarded the fort. The level east side was protected by two stone ramparts and five ditches. Parts of these ramparts were over 11 metres (35 ft) high measuring from the bottom of the ditch as of 1875.

The walls of the fort are around 1 metre (3.3 ft) thick. However, because they are made up of dry-laid stone, the removal of a few stones would be sufficient to bring the entire wall collapsing down. To prevent access to the walls themselves, the inhabitants of the fort raised large breastworks around the base of the walls by piling up rock rubble against the bases. These rubble barriers are over 1.22 metres (4.0 ft) high, and in places they are over 1.22 metres (4.0 ft) thick. Attackers would have had to clear away the rubble before being able to attack the wall, and all the while they would be under direct fire from defenders on the top of the wall.

=== Storage pits ===
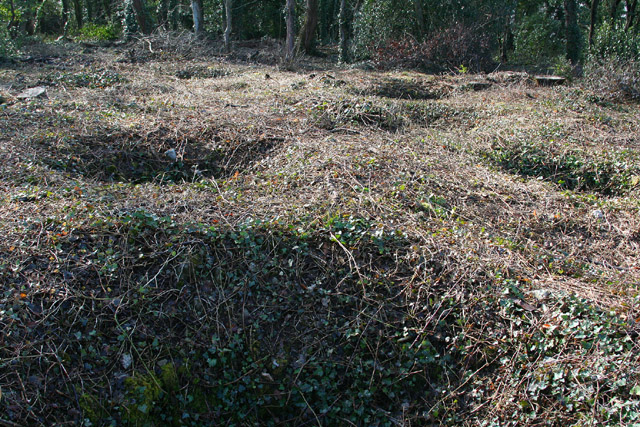
Storage pits

The area inside the outer wall has a series of hut circles and 93 storage pits cut directly into the bedrock, which is only around 60 centimetres (2.0 ft) beneath the surface of the soil in most places. Eighteen of the Storage pits are in what Dymond calls the "keep", one is in the 'transverse fosse' (a fosse is a ditch usually dug for protection), and seventy-four of the pits are outside the "keep" but still enclosed within the exterior walls. The average size of the pits is around 2 metres (6.6 ft) long by 2 metres wide and 1.5 metres (4.9 ft) deep. The largest pit is roughly triangular in shape, with sides measuring 3 metres (9.8 ft), 2.7 metres (8.9 ft), and 2.4 metres (7.9 ft) long. The smallest pit is 1 metre (3.3 ft) long by 7 metres (23 ft) wide. The inhabitants used them to store grain, as is evidenced by the kernels of barley and wheat and the sherds of pots that were found in the pits. Several of the pits contained the remnants of peas and burned woven baskets. In addition, researchers also found sling stones and spindle whorls dated to the 1st or 2nd century BC inside them.

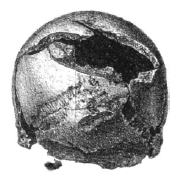
A skull, found during Dymond's second exploration, which is gouged with many cuts from an edged weapon. (Drawn in 1886 for Dymond's book, Worlebury: An Ancient Stronghold in the County of Somerset.)

Eighteen of these pits were found to contain the remains of human skeletons, which are now stored in the Weston-super-Mare Museum in Weston-super-Mare. Eighteen full skeletons were found, of which ten showed evidence of a violent death (including sword cuts in the skulls). It is possible that the Romans or the Belgic raiders attacked the fort and killed the inhabitants.

=== Artefacts ===
A cast copper alloy penannular collar of special interest to archaeologists has been found at the campsite. It may indicate that this hilltop site was used even before the Iron Age, since related artefacts tend to be found with Bronze Age items, and it was the first of its type found in Britain. In 2006, a related copper penannular brooch dating to the 5th or 6th century AD was found in a spring between Brecon Beacons and the Black Mountains in Wales. A gold penannular bracelet was found in the River Perry.

Roman coins have been found at Worlebury Camp since the Romans had established a presence by the end of the 1st century AD. Many of the Roman coins bear the image of the Western Roman Emperor Honorius. This was inside the fort proper. Another coin was located by Trinity Path which leads towards the fort.

Other findings at the site include animal remains, including the bones of pigs, oxen, horses, deer, goats, and even small birds. Limpet shells have also been found near the bones. Archaeologists found iron objects, adding further credibility to the idea that this fort is from the Iron Age. These objects include a chisel or borer, several spearheads and javelin heads, and an iron cone with charred wood inside and a rivet hole through the cone. Dymond assumes that this cone was once a plowshare. Stone artefacts, mainly slingstones and scrapers, have been discovered at the site. Just less than 36 flint chips have been found, of which some may be arrowheads. One good-quality arrowhead has been found. In addition to these, Dymond recorded finding a lead lump about the size of a walnut that he decided was probably a sling bullet. Glastonbury type bead-rim pottery was also found at this site. A socketed bronze axe from the late Bronze Age, which was found at Worlebury Hill in 1883, is in the Ashmolean Museum.

== Damage to the site ==
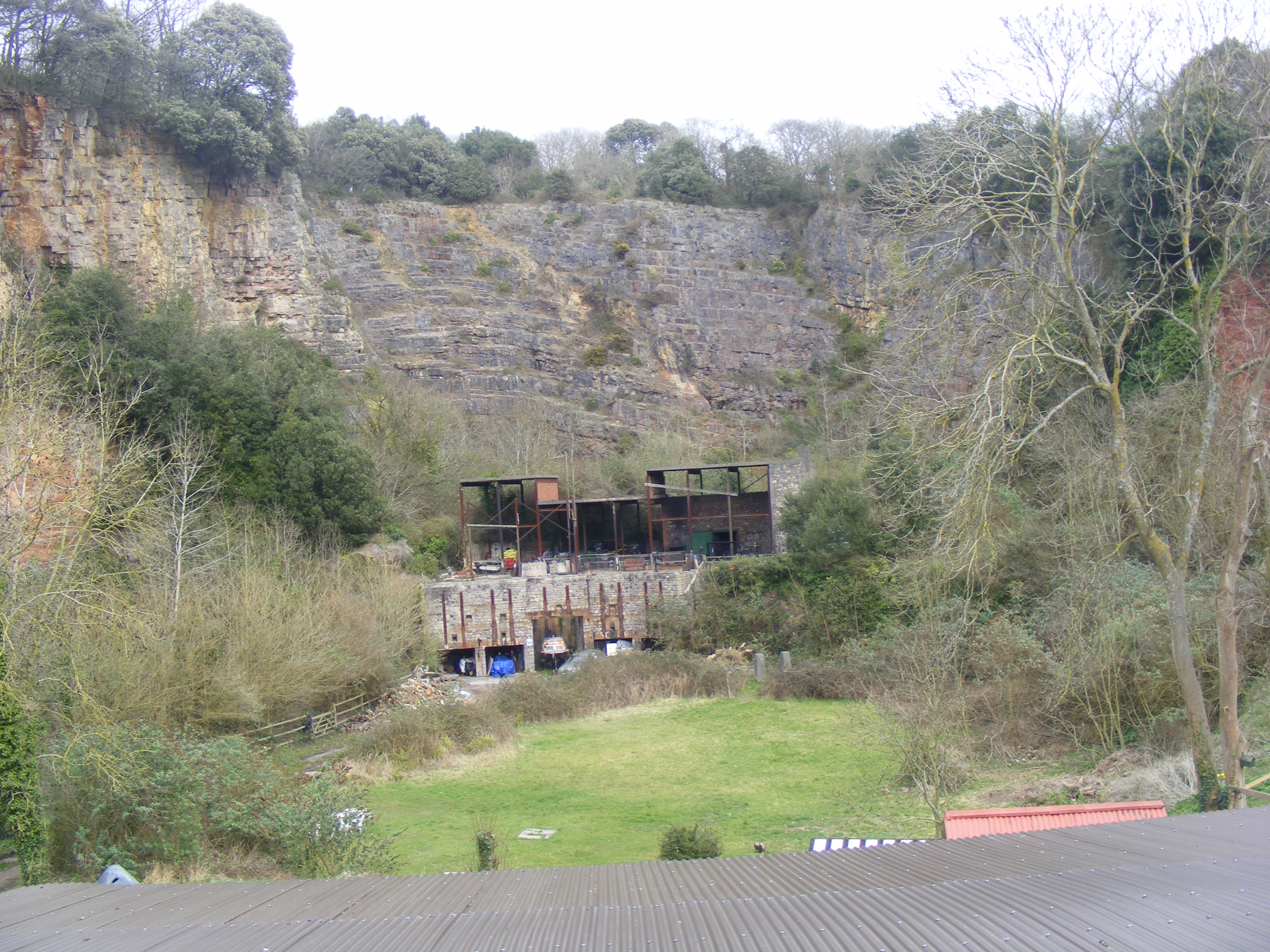
19th century quarry on the south side of the hill, seen looking north from "South Road"

=== 19th century ===
Development of Weston-super-Mare since the 19th century has resulted in three episodes of potentially irreversible damage to the site. A quarry started operation in the southern side of Worlebury Hill in 1815 to mine for galena, calamine, and stone. The Bristol and Exeter Railway arrived in Weston-super-Mare in 1841, making it profitable to expand the village into a town. In 1842, Weston-super-Mare became a town with the granting of the Improvement and Market Act of May 1842. This act also proposed developing houses right over the brow of the hill. This would have gone straight through Worlebury Camp; however, the actual expansion never reached the site. By 1853, some development had occurred according to the proposed expansion, but it had skirted the hillfort and continued to the east.

=== 20th century ===
In the early 20th century, the Worlebury fort itself was damaged by boys rolling stones, including some from the walls of the fort, down the hill on which it stands. The Axbridge District of the Somerset Archaeological Society was taking steps to prevent such damage from happening again.

=== 21st century ===
Some of the trees planted in the early 19th century had become very large, and their roots were growing into the archaeological structures. In 2005, the Forestry Commission gave permission for North Somerset Council to fell 300 trees to reduce the subsequent risks. A member of the North Somerset Council, Christopher Richards, said: "If we had a storm up here and these trees came down, then the entire hillfort could be destroyed."

The site was added to the Heritage at Risk Register in 2017, its condition noted as 'declining'. A condition survey and an analytical earthwork survey revealed some evidence about the use of the hillfort and its later history but many questions remain.

In 2020 the council initiated a consultation on plans to remove more "thousands" of trees to protect the remains.

== See also ==
- Archeological site
- List of hillforts in England
- List of hillforts and ancient settlements in Somerset
