= Prehistoric storage pits =

Underground cists used to protect the seeds

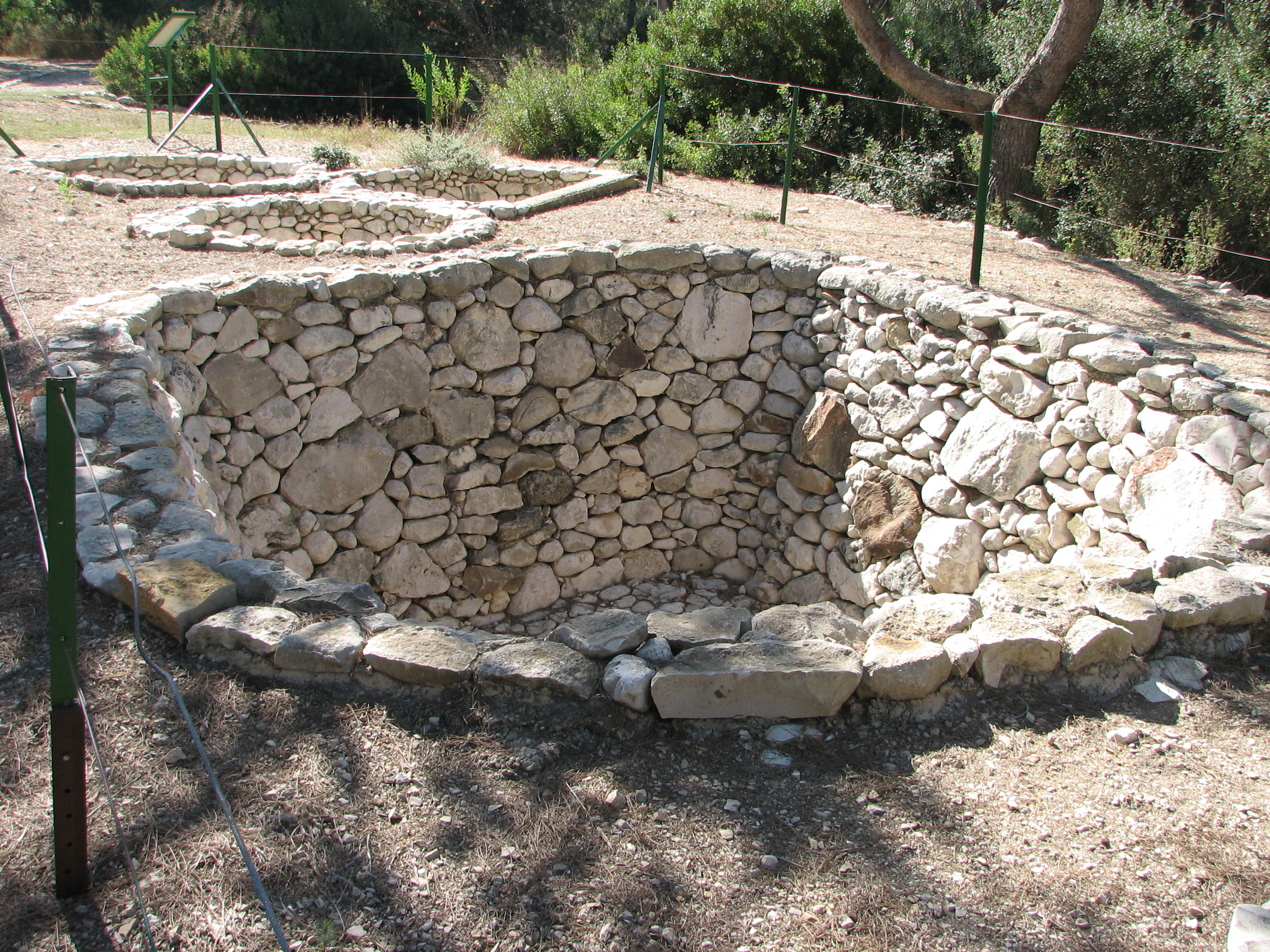
Granaries from an Iron Age Israelite fortress in the Negev, reconstructed at Derech Hadorot, Hecht Museum, Haifa

Storage pits are underground cists that were used historically to protect the seeds for the following year's crops, and to stop surplus food from being eaten by insects and rodents. These underground pits were sometimes lined and covered, for example with slabs of stone and bark and tightly sealed with adobe.

== Examples ==
Sannai-Maruyama Site in Aomori, Aomori Prefecture, Japan, contains storage pits that were used when hunter-gatherers developed from a nomadic lifestyle to settled villages about 3900 BC to 2900 BC. Large storage pits were built underground to conceal their presence, a preferred method used by mobile populations in many parts of the world.

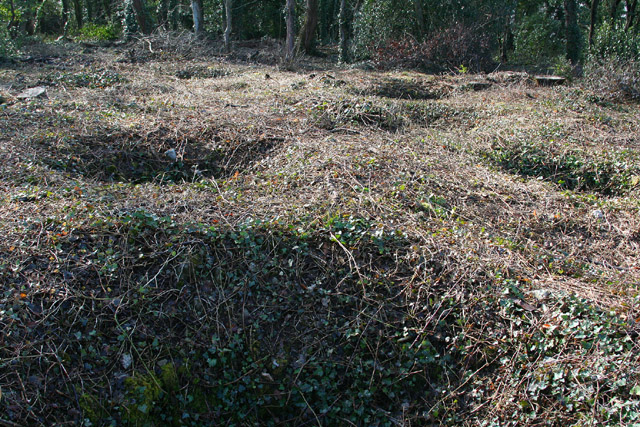
Worlebury storage pits

Worlebury Camp storage pits are 93 storage pits found at the Iron Age hill fort that stood north of the town of Weston-super-Mare in Somerset, England. The pits were cut into bedrock for "keeps", one is a ditch for protection, and 74 are outside the "keep" but still enclosed within the exterior walls. The inhabitants used them to store grain, as is evidenced by the kernels of barley and wheat and the shards of pots that were found in the pits. Also found were remains of burned woven baskets and, dated to the 2nd or 1st century BC, sling stones and spindle whorls. and close to the village of Worle. Remains of human skeletons were found in 18 of the pits, 10 of which show evidence of a violent death.

Māori storage pit sites remain clearly visible in many place in New Zealand. Pits were dug into soft rock faces as well as into earth, especially in Maori Pa (hillforts). Maori storage pits can be confused with fighting pits and also pits which were excavated to extract drainage material, especially on old river terraces where pumice had been deposited. The pumice was mixed with heavier soil to promote drainage for growing kumara (sweet potato), the principal vegetable crop of the Maori after about 1500. The Maori name for a storage pit is rua. An excavation found such storage pits on the sloping banks of the Waikato River below the Waikato Museum in early 2012.
