= Grey Croft stone circle =

Archaeological site in Cumbria, England

- Location within Cumbria
- 54.4076°N 3.4908°W
- Type: Stone circle
- Periods: Neolithic / Bronze Age
- Location: Cumbria

Grey Croft stone circle is a restored stone circle near Seascale in Cumbria, England (grid reference NY03340238). It is situated near the site of the former nuclear-power stations at Sellafield.

== Description ==
Grey Croft stone circle is a circle of 12 stones situated south of the Sellafield nuclear site. The circle is about 600 metres (2,000 ft) from the sea. Only 10 of the original 12 stones are currently standing. There is a small outlying stone 21 metres (69 ft) to the north.

== History ==
The stones in the circle were toppled over and buried in 1820 by a tenant farmer, with the exception of one stone. In 1949 the site was excavated and nine of the stones were located, and replaced as accurately as possible.

The excavations uncovered an oval stone cairn situated in the circle centre. Trenching under the cairn revealed charcoal traces, calcined bones, a broken early Bronze Age jet or lignite ring, and flint flakes and scraper. A Great Langdale Late-Neolithic stone axe was found near to the eastern stone of the circle.

== See also ==
- Swinside stone circle, 12 miles to the southeast
