= Castlerigg =

Area of Keswick, Cumbria, England

Coordinates: 54.592°N 3.111°W

Castlerigg is an area of Keswick, Cumbria, England. Castlerigg is named after a hill in the immediate area.

Until the early twentieth century much of the area, comprising a large part of Keswick, was owned by the family living at Castlerigg Manor. Nowadays the Manor is a Catholic youth centre and only owns its own buildings and gardens.

The word 'Castlerigg' is used to refer to one of the points of interest in that area, such as those cited below:

- Castlerigg Hall
- Castlerigg Manor
- Castlerigg Stone Circle
