= Gamelands stone circle =

Stone circle near Orton in Cumbria, England

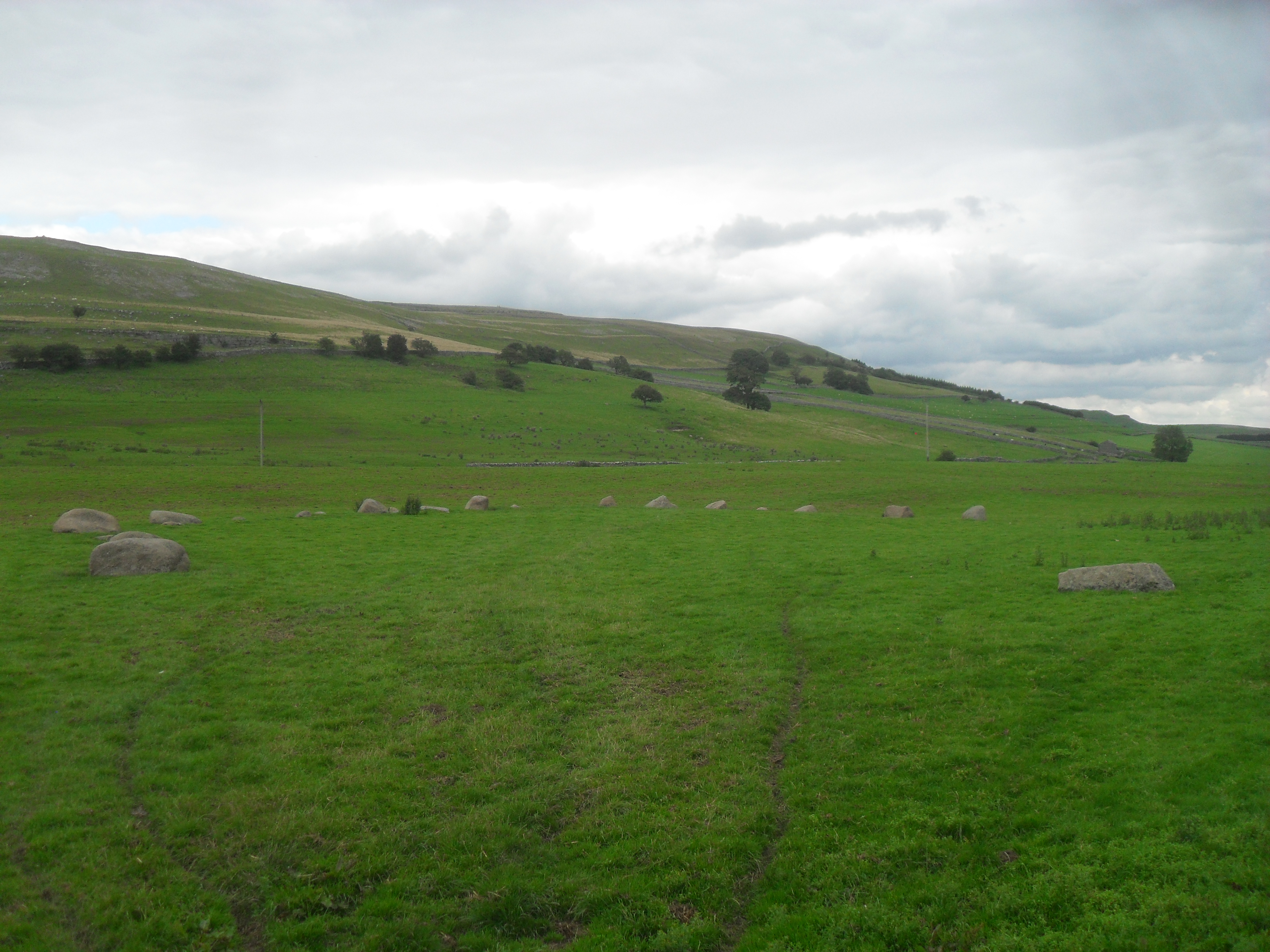

- Location in Eden, Cumbria Location in Cumbria, England
- 54.468337°N 2.556181°W
- Type: Stone circle
- Periods: Neolithic / Bronze Age
- Location: Cumbria
- OS grid reference: NY640082

Gamelands stone circle (or Orton stone circle) is a stone circle at the foot of Knott Hill in Cumbria, England. The stones are mostly made of red granite and some were buried and blasted in 1862.

== Description ==
Gamelands stone circle (grid reference NY640082) lies between the village of Orton and the hamlet of Raisbeck. It is an oval enclosure of around 40 large stones, all of which have fallen, together with three smaller stones. The stones are set into a slight bank. All of the stones are of pink granite with the exception of one which is limestone. The stones are all below one metre in height and are arranged in an oval of 42 metres by 35 metres.

== History ==
Around 1862, when the area was ploughed, some of the stones were buried or blasted. Some stones have been taken for a wall to the south. Ploughing uncovered two worked flints and a probable cist-slab. The circle was surveyed in 1966, but it was not easy to tell whether the stones have ever been in a standing position.
