= Maelmin Henge =

Outdoor sculpture in Northumberland, England

Coordinates: 55°35′47″N 2°05′48″W

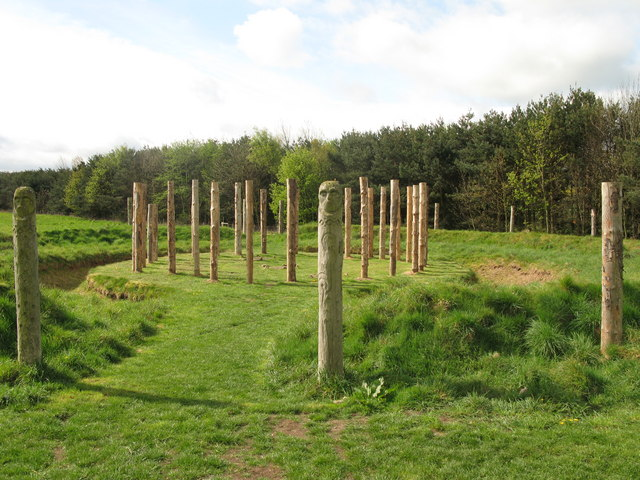
Maelmin Henge

Maelmin Henge is modern interpretation/reconstruction of a henge monument near the village of Milfield, Northumberland in the Till Valley.

It was built in the spring of 2000.

The landscape in which the contemporary monument sits held a number of Neolithic and early Bronze Age henge monuments around 5,000 years ago and the new monument is based on excavations of one of these, the site of which is close by.

The monument was created by Clive Waddington, who has written a guide to interpret it.

== Heritage Trail ==
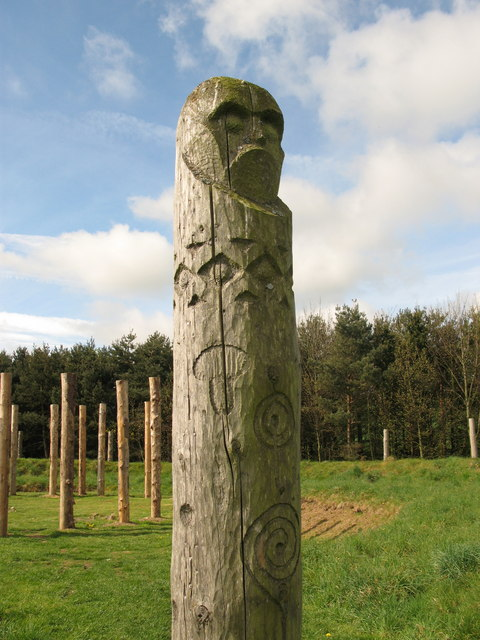
Carved posts in the henge, since replaced with new posts

There is a heritage trail leading on from the henge.

== Stewardship ==
The site maintenance is taken care of by Newcastle University, and the monument exists thanks to support from local people and supporters.

== See also ==
Other modern henge monuments include:

- The Devil's Quoits site restoration in Oxfordshire (between 2002 and 2008)
- Arctic Henge Raufarhöfn, Iceland (1996)
- Achill-henge (2011)
- Sark Henge (2015)
