= Agriculture in prehistoric Scotland =

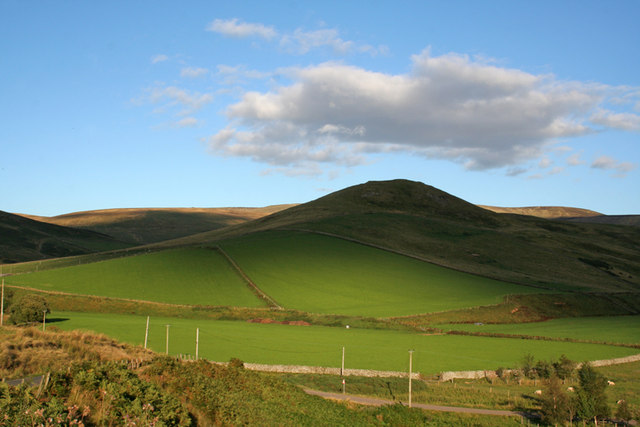
Park Law Iron Age settlement near Sourhope in the Borders, was the site of an agricultural settlement during the Iron Age. Nearby hillsides have prominent lynchets or cultivation rigs.

Agriculture in prehistoric Scotland includes all forms of farm production in the modern boundaries of Scotland before the beginning of the early historic era. Scotland has between a fifth and a sixth of the arable or good pastoral land of England and Wales, mostly in the south and east. Heavy rainfall encouraged the spread of acidic blanket peat bog, which with wind and salt spray, made most of the western islands treeless. Hills, mountains, quicksands and marshes made internal communication and agriculture difficult.

In the Neolithic period, from around 6,000 years ago, there is evidence of permanent settlements and farming. The two main sources of food were grain and cow's milk. In the early Bronze Age, arable land spread at the expense of forest, but towards the end of the period there is evidence of the abandonment of farming in the uplands and deterioration of soils. From the Iron Age, hill forts in southern Scotland are associated with cultivation ridges and terraces. Souterrains, small underground constructions, may have been for storing perishable agricultural products. Extensive prehistoric field systems underlie existing boundaries in some Lowland areas, suggesting that the fertile plains were already densely exploited for agriculture. Birch, oak, and hazel regrowth during the Roman occupation of Britain indicates a decline in agriculture.

== Land and climate ==
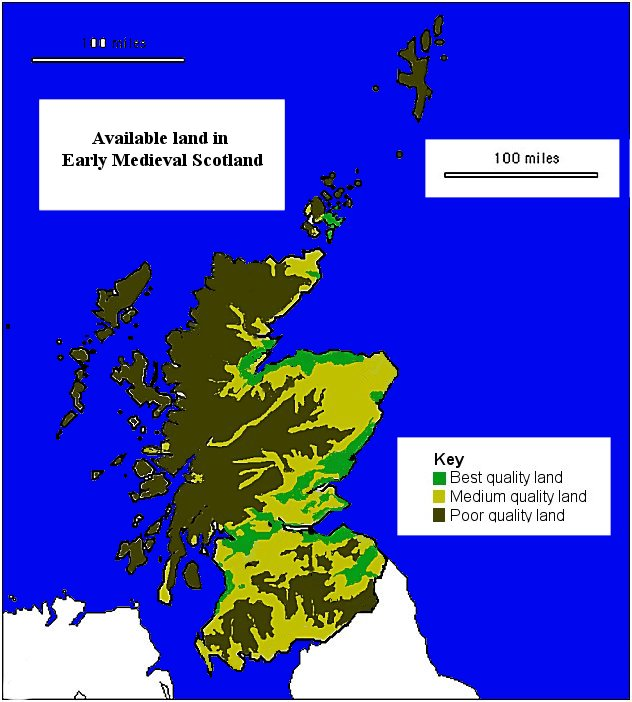
Map of available land in early Scotland.

Scotland is roughly half the size of England and Wales and has approximately the same amount of coastline, but only between a fifth and a sixth of the amount of the arable or good pastoral land, under 60 metres above sea level, and most of this is located in the south and east. This made marginal pastoral farming and fishing, the key factors in the pre-modern economy. Its east Atlantic position means that it has very heavy rainfall: today about 700 cm per year in the east and over 1,000 cm in the west. This encouraged the spread of blanket peat bog, the acidity of which, combined with high level of wind and salt spray, made most of the western islands treeless. The existence of hills, mountains, quicksands and marshes made agriculture and internal communication difficult.

At times during the last interglacial period (130,000–70,000 BCE) Europe had a climate warmer than it is today, and early humans may have made their way to Scotland, though archaeologists have found no traces of this. Glaciers then scoured their way across most of Britain, and only after the ice retreated did Scotland again become habitable, around 9600 BCE. Mesolithic hunter-gatherer encampments formed the first known settlements, and archaeologists have dated an encampment near Biggar to around 8500 BCE. Numerous other sites found around Scotland build up a picture of highly mobile boat-using people making tools from bone, stone and antlers. The oldest house for which there is evidence in Britain is the oval structure of wooden posts found at South Queensferry near the Firth of Forth, dating from the Mesolithic period, about 8240 BCE.

== Neolithic ==
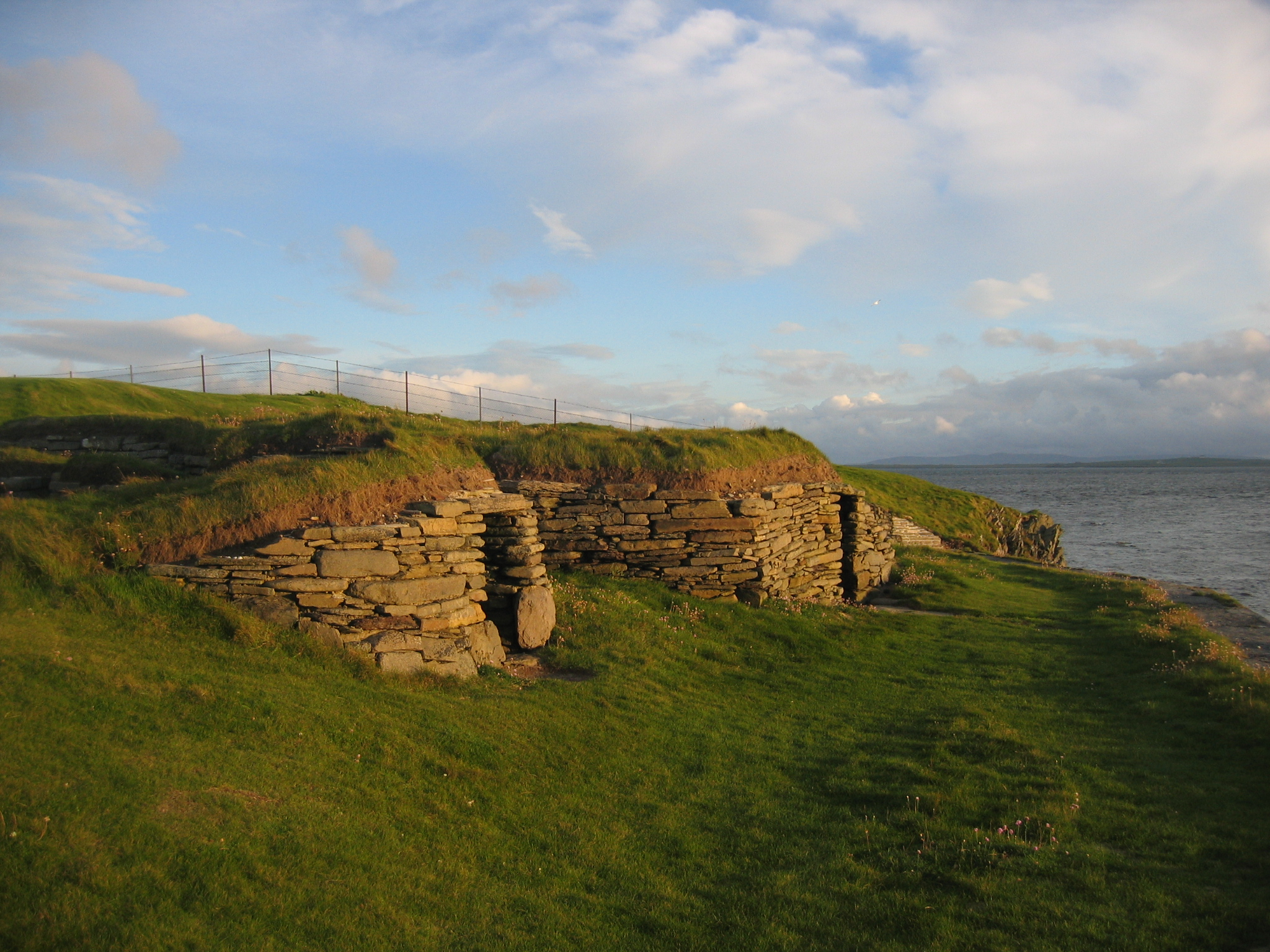
The houses at Knap of Howar, demonstrating the beginning of settled agriculture in Scotland

From the Neolithic period, beginning around 6,000 years ago, there is evidence of permanent settlements and farming. This includes the settlement at Dunning in Perthshire, dating from 3800 to 3700 BCE, which includes faint plough marks, probably made by a hand-held scratch plough known as an ard, which does not turn over the soil. There is the well-preserved stone house at Knap of Howar on Papa Westray, dating from around 3500 BCE and the village of similar houses at Skara Brae on West Mainland, Orkney from about 500 years later. Evidence of prehistoric farming includes small plots of improved land, with simple stone boundaries. In Shetland these have been found under peat and on the mainland they are associated with cairnfields, piles of rocks that have been cleared from fields.

There was removal of oak-birch woodland in areas of good coastal or river access where archaeological remains from the period are most abundant, mainly through livestock grazing. Archaeological evidence of pollen, pottery, settlements and human remains, indicates that the two main sources of food were grain and cow's milk, in a pattern that probably remained constant until the High Middle Ages. There is also some limited evidence of the cultivation of flax from this period.

== Bronze Age ==
From the beginning of the Bronze Age, about 2000 BCE, extensive analyses of Black Loch in Fife indicate that arable land spread at the expense of forest. The oak-birch woodlands were eroded in the more accessible areas of the uplands by seasonal grazing of livestock and through some use of slash and burn and woodcutting methods of clearance. However, towards the end of the period, pollen analyses indicate that climate deterioration meant that arable farming was abandoned at upland sites and there were increases in the intensity of anthropogenic impacts at lowland sites, of agriculture leading to changes in the structure of soils. Traditionally this was seen as leading to the abandonment of intensive agriculture, but more recent studies have indicated that it was possible to renew and maintain the fertility of soils.

There is scattered evidence of field systems in this period, with extensive walls in some areas, suggesting pastoral agriculture. Excavations like that at the Scord of Brouster field-system, with its enclosing walls, low lynchets and clearance heaps, suggests that it was part of a larger enclosed landscape. A rig discovered at North Mains indicates that there may have been ridged field surfaces that have been eroded by later agricultural activity. Key arable crops included barley and flax. Oats were not cultivated and grew as wild grass.

== Iron Age ==
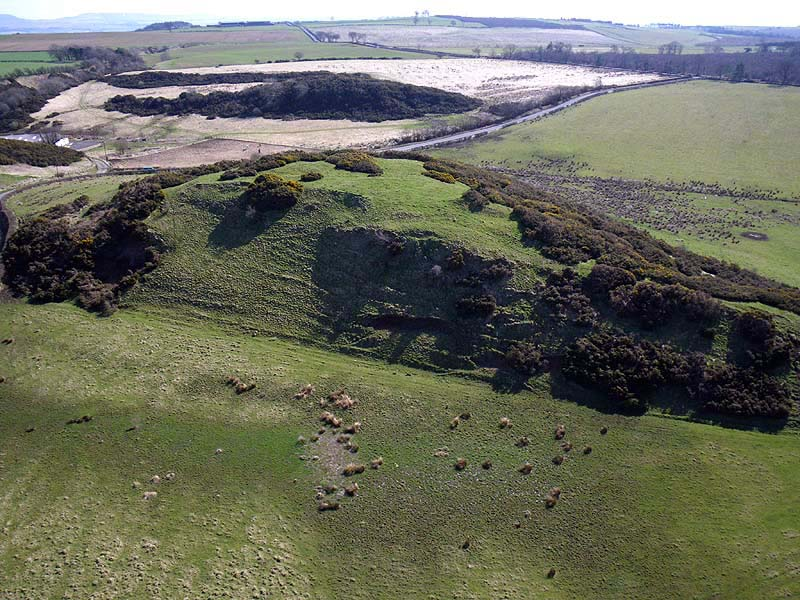
Peace Knowe Hillfort, West Lothian. From their introduction in the Iron Age hillforts became major centres of agriculture.

From the Iron Age, beginning in the seventh century BCE, as elsewhere in Europe, hill forts were first introduced. Some of these forts in southern Scotland are associated with cultivation ridges and terraces. Over 400 souterrains, small underground constructions, have been discovered in Scotland, many of them in the south-east, and although few have been dated, those that have suggest a construction date in the second or third centuries CE. They are usually found close to settlements (whose timber frames are much less well-preserved) and may have been for storing perishable agricultural products. There are about 100 hollow-walled circular drystone broch towers, probably dating from about 200 BCE, and unique to Scotland. Many had surrounding ditches or defensive walls, which may have contained several houses and they were probably designed to defend the most valuable stretches of agricultural land.

Aerial photography has revealed extensive prehistoric field systems that underlie existing boundaries in some Lowland areas, suggesting that the fertile plains were already densely exploited for agriculture. There was extensive removal of oak-elm-hazel woodland, initially near settlements and major thoroughfares, particularly from felling for fuel. Domesticated animals included sheep and smaller numbers of cattle and pigs. During the period of Roman occupation of what is now northern England, and occasional advances into Southern Scotland, there was re-growth of birch-oak woodlands for five centuries, suggesting that the Roman invasions had a negative impact on the native population and the extent of agriculture.
