= Scheduled monuments in Staffordshire =

This is a list of scheduled monuments in Staffordshire, a county in England.

In the United Kingdom, a scheduled monument is a "nationally important" archaeological site or historic building that has been given protection against unauthorised change by being placed on a list (or "schedule") by the Secretary of State for Culture, Media and Sport; English Heritage takes the leading role in identifying such sites. Scheduled monuments are defined in the Ancient Monuments and Archaeological Areas Act 1979 and the National Heritage Act 1983. There are about 20,000 scheduled monument entries on the list, which is maintained by English Heritage; more than one site can be included in a single entry.

While a scheduled monument can also be recognised as a listed building, English Heritage considers listed building status as a better way of protecting buildings than scheduled monument status. If a monument is considered by English Heritage to "no longer merit scheduling" it can be de-scheduled.

Staffordshire has over 250 scheduled monuments including barrow burial mounds, Roman camps, castles and medieval moated sites.

== List of scheduled monuments ==
Image	Name	Feature	Location	Notes
	Abbots Bromley market cross	Cross	Abbots Bromley, East Staffordshire	
	Air photographic site SW of Elford	Landscape	Fisherwick, Lichfield	
	Alley's Lane moated site	Moated site	Church Eaton, Stafford	
	Alton Castle	Castle	Alton, Staffordshire Moorlands	
	Anglo-Scandinavian cross, All Saints' churchyard	Cross	Chebsey, Stafford	
	Anglo-Scandinavian cross fragment, St Peter's churchyard	Cross	Alstonefield, Staffordshire Moorlands	
	Anglo-Scandinavian cross, Church of the Holy Cross	Cross	Ilam, Staffordshire Moorlands	12m south of the south porch of the Church of the Holy Cross
	Anglo-Scandinavian cross, Church of the Holy Cross	Cross	Ilam, Staffordshire Moorlands	7m south of the south transept of the Church of the Holy Cross
	Anglo-Scandinavian cross, Ilam Hall	Cross	Ilam, Staffordshire Moorlands	240m south west of Ilam Hall
	Anglo-Scandinavian cross, St Edward's Church	Cross	Leek, Staffordshire Moorlands	11m east of St Edward's Church
	Anglo-Scandinavian cross, St Edward's Church	Cross	Leek, Staffordshire Moorlands	2m south of St Edward's Church
	Anglo-Scandinavian cross, St Mary's churchyard	Cross	Rolleston on Dove, East Staffordshire	
	Anglo-Scandinavian cross, St Peter's churchyard	Cross	Stoke-on-Trent	
	Auctioneer's Mound	Barrow	Loggerheads, Newcastle-under-Lyme	A bowl barrow 70m NE of St John the Baptist's Church
	Audley's Cross	Cross	Loggerheads, Newcastle-under-Lyme	240m SSW of Audley's Cross Farmhouse
	Bagot's Bromley moated manorial enclosure	Moated site	Abbots Bromley, East Staffordshire	
	Berry Ring hillfort	Fort	Bradley, Stafford	
	Bishop's Wood glass furnace	Industrial	Eccleshall, Stafford	
	Blake Low bowl barrow	Barrow	Warslow and Elkstones, Staffordshire Moorlands	
	Blakenhall moated site	Moated site	Barton-under-Needwood, East Staffordshire	
	Blithewood moated site	Moated site	Checkley, Staffordshire Moorlands	
	Boscobel House	House	Boscobel, Shropshire	
	Bowl barrow 110m south-west of Threelows Cottages	Barrow	Farley, Staffordshire Moorlands	
	Bowl barrow 120m north-east of Bincliff Mines	Barrow	Ilam, Staffordshire Moorlands	
	Bowl barrow 120m south-west of Weag's Barn	Barrow	Grindon, Staffordshire Moorlands	
	Bowl barrow 140m north of Thorswood Plantation	Barrow	Wootton, East Staffordshire	
	Bowl barrow 150m south-east of Cliff Top	Barrow	Blore with Swinscoe, Staffordshire Moorlands	
	Bowl barrow 160m north of Lower Green House	Barrow	Waterhouses, Staffordshire Moorlands	
	Bowl barrow 160m south of summit of Musden Low	Barrow	Waterhouses, Staffordshire Moorlands	
	Bowl barrow 160m south-east of Oldfields Farm	Barrow	Grindon, Staffordshire Moorlands	
	Bowl barrow 170m north of The Low	Barrow	Fawfieldhead, Staffordshire Moorlands	
	Bowl barrow 180m south-east of the Izaak Walton Hotel	Barrow	Ilam, Staffordshire Moorlands	
	Bowl barrow 190m north of Dale Abbey Farm	Barrow	Stanton, East Staffordshire	
	Bowl barrow 200m south-west of Ecton Hill	Barrow	Wetton, Staffordshire Moorlands	
	Bowl barrow 220m north of Dale Abbey Farm	Barrow	Stanton, East Staffordshire	
	Bowl barrow 230m north of North Wood	Barrow	Wootton, East Staffordshire	
	Bowl barrow 230m west of summit of Musden Low	Barrow	Waterhouses, Staffordshire Moorlands	
	Bowl barrow 240m north-west of Rainroach Farm	Barrow	Alton, Staffordshire Moorlands	
	Bowl barrow 260m north of Damgate	Barrow	Ilam, Staffordshire Moorlands	
	Bowl Barrow 280m ESE of Hall Green House	Barrow	Checkley, Staffordshire Moorlands	
	Bowl barrow 300m north of Slade House	Barrow	Waterhouses, Staffordshire Moorlands	
	Bowl barrow 330m east of Weaver Farm	Barrow	Wootton, East Staffordshire	
	Bowl barrow 350m south-east of Highfields Mine	Barrow	Ilam, Staffordshire Moorlands	
	Bowl barrow 350m south-west of Merryton Low	Barrow	Onecote, Staffordshire Moorlands	
	Bowl barrow 360m north-west of The Low	Barrow	Fawfieldhead, Staffordshire Moorlands	
	Bowl barrow 380m north-west of Beechenhill	Barrow	Ilam, Staffordshire Moorlands	
	Bowl barrow 380m south-west of Blore Church	Barrow	Blore with Swinscoe, Staffordshire Moorlands	
	Bowl barrow 400m north of Damgate	Barrow	Ilam, Staffordshire Moorlands	
	Bowl barrow 400m north-west of Beechenhill	Barrow	Ilam, Staffordshire Moorlands	
	Bowl barrow 400m west of Damgate	Barrow	Ilam, Staffordshire Moorlands	
	Bowl barrow 40m north of Rushley Barn	Barrow	Waterhouses, Staffordshire Moorlands	
	Bowl barrow 420m north of Beechenhill	Barrow	Ilam, Staffordshire Moorlands	
	Bowl barrow 440m north of Banks Farm	Barrow	Wootton, East Staffordshire	
	Bowl barrow 440m south east of Throwley Cottage	Barrow	Waterhouses, Staffordshire Moorlands	
	Bowl barrow 450m east of Stanshope	Barrow	Alstonefield, Staffordshire Moorlands	
	Bowl barrow 450m north of Damgate	Barrow	Ilam, Staffordshire Moorlands	
	Bowl barrow 450m south of Hillside	Barrow	Warslow and Elkstones, Staffordshire Moorlands	
	Bowl barrow 460m north-east of Blore	Barrow	Blore with Swinscoe, Staffordshire Moorlands	
	Bowl barrow 50m north-west of Thorswood Plantation	Barrow	Wootton, East Staffordshire	
	Bowl barrow 50m west of summit of Musden Low	Barrow	Waterhouses, Staffordshire Moorlands	
	Bowl barrow 510m north of Latham Hall	Barrow	Waterhouses, Staffordshire Moorlands	
	Bowl barrow 540m north-east of Beechenhill	Barrow	Ilam, Staffordshire Moorlands	
	Bowl barrow 70m north-east of Bincliff Mines	Barrow	Ilam, Staffordshire Moorlands	
	Bowl barrow 70m north-west of The Boxes	Barrow	Mayfield, East Staffordshire	
	Bowl barrow 80m north-west of Oldwood	Barrow	Croxden, East Staffordshire	
	Bowl barrow 810m north-west of Rushley Bridge	Barrow	Ilam, Staffordshire Moorlands	
	Bowl barrow at north-west end of Gratton Hill	Barrow	Alstonefield, Staffordshire Moorlands	
	Bowl barrow at north-west end of summit of Gratton Hill	Barrow	Alstonefield, Staffordshire Moorlands	
	Bowl barrow at south-eastern end of summit of Gratton Hill	Barrow	Alstonefield, Staffordshire Moorlands	
	Bowl barrow at St Thomas's Trees	Barrow	Dilhorne, Staffordshire Moorlands	
	Bowl barrow east of Bunster Hill	Barrow	Ilam, Staffordshire Moorlands	
	Bowl barrow in Swynnerton Park	Barrow	Swynnerton, Stafford	
	Bowl barrow in Swythamley Park	Barrow	Heaton, Staffordshire Moorlands	
	Bowl barrow near Highfields Mine, south-west of Stanshope	Barrow	Ilam, Staffordshire Moorlands	
	Bowl barrow north of Hargreaves Wood	Barrow	Swynnerton, Stafford	
	Bowl barrow north-east of Coatestown	Barrow	Hollinsclough, Staffordshire Moorlands	
	Bowl barrow on Arbour Hill	Barrow	Waterhouses, Staffordshire Moorlands	
	Bowl barrow on Archford Moor	Barrow	Alstonefield, Staffordshire Moorlands	
	Bowl barrow on Hazelton Hill	Barrow	Blore with Swinscoe, Staffordshire Moorlands	
	Bowl barrow on Maer Hills	Barrow	Maer, Newcastle-under-Lyme	
	Bowl barrow on Marten Hill	Barrow	Okeover, East Staffordshire	
	Bowl barrow on Mere Hill	Barrow	Waterhouses, Staffordshire Moorlands	
	Bowl barrow on Milk Hill	Barrow	Waterhouses, Staffordshire Moorlands	
	Bowl barrow on Narrowdale Hill	Barrow	Alstonefield, Staffordshire Moorlands	
	Bowl barrow on summit of Musden Low	Barrow	Waterhouses, Staffordshire Moorlands	
	Bowl barrow on The Roundabout	Barrow	Norbury, Stafford	
	Bowl barrow on The Walk	Barrow	Wootton, East Staffordshire	
	Bowl barrow on Toot Hill	Barrow	Uttoxeter, East Staffordshire	
	Bowl barrow on Weaver Hills 550m south of Walk Farm	Barrow	Wootton, East Staffordshire	
	Bowl barrow on Weaver Hills 550m south of Weaver Farm	Barrow	Wootton, East Staffordshire	
	Bowl barrow on Weaver Hills 570m south of Weaver Farm	Barrow	Wootton, East Staffordshire	
	Bowl barrow on Weaver Hills 600m south of Weaver Farm	Barrow	Wootton, East Staffordshire	
	Bowl barrow on Weaver Hills 680m south of Walk Farm	Barrow	Wootton, East Staffordshire	
	Bowl barrow on Weaver Hills 730m south of Walk Farm	Barrow	Wootton, East Staffordshire	
	Bowl barrow on Wetton Hill	Barrow	Wetton, Staffordshire Moorlands	
	Bowl barrow on Wetton Hill 650m north-west of Under Wetton	Barrow	Wetton, Staffordshire Moorlands	
	Bowl barrow south of Stanshope Pasture	Barrow	Alstonefield, Staffordshire Moorlands	
	Bowl barrow south of Townend	Barrow	Sheen, Staffordshire Moorlands	
	Bowl barrow west of Thorswood Plantation	Barrow	Wootton, East Staffordshire	
	Bridge, towpath and lock on Staffordshire and Worcestershire Canal at Awbridge	Bridge	Trysull and Seisdon, South Staffordshire	
	Brindley's Mill	Mill	Leek, Staffordshire Moorlands	
	Brownlow bowl barrow	Barrow	Warslow and Elkstones, Staffordshire Moorlands	
	Brund Low bowl barrow	Barrow	Sheen, Staffordshire Moorlands	
	Bunbury hillfort	Fort	Farley, Staffordshire Moorlands	A univallate hillfort south west of Alton Towers
	Burton upon Trent Abbey	Church	Burton, East Staffordshire	
	Butter Cross, Bradnop	Cross	Bradnop, Staffordshire Moorlands	700m north east of Stile House Farm
	Butter Cross, Cheddleton	Cross	Cheddleton, Staffordshire Moorlands	650m west of Lowerhouse Farm
	Calwich Low bowl barrow	Barrow	Ellastone, East Staffordshire	
	Camp NE of Stretton Mill	Settlement	Lapley, Stretton and Wheaton Aston, South Staffordshire	
	Canal aqueduct	Bridge	Forton, Stafford	
	Cart Low bowl barrow	Barrow	Waterhouses, Staffordshire Moorlands	
	Castle Hill motte	Castle	Audley Rural, Newcastle-under-Lyme	
	Castle Ring, a multivallate hillfort and medieval hunting lodge	Fort	Cannock Chase	
	Causewayed enclosure	Enclosure	Fradley and Streethay, Lichfield	
	Chartley Castle	Castle	Stowe-by-Chartley, Stafford	Chartley Old Hall and associated water control systems including garden remains
	Chatterley Whitfield Colliery	Mining	Stoke-on-Trent	
	Churchyard cross, St Edward's churchyard	Cross	Cheddleton, Staffordshire Moorlands	
	Churchyard cross, St Luke's churchyard	Cross	Cannock Chase	
	Churchyard cross, St Mary's churchyard	Cross	Ellenhall, Stafford	
	Circular earthwork near Bishton Hall	Earthworks	Colwich, Stafford	400yds (360m) east of Bishton Hall
	Circular enclosures near Bonthorn	Enclosure	Wychnor, East Staffordshire	100yds (90m) SW of Bonthorn
	Circular enclosures near Wychnor Junction	Enclosure	Wychnor, East Staffordshire	Centring 300yds (270m) west of Wychnor Junction
	Consall Lime Kilns	Industrial	Consall, Staffordshire Moorlands	
	Copper mines on Ecton Hill	Mining	Wetton, Staffordshire Moorlands	
	Creswell Chapel	Church	Creswell, Stafford	
	Cross in Rocester churchyard	Cross	Rocester, East Staffordshire	
	Croxden Abbey	Church	Croxden, East Staffordshire	
	Defensive earthworks at Roman Camp Bank, Hollywood	Defences	Stone Rural, Stafford	Enclosure 350m NNW of Hollywood FarmE
	Devil's Ring and Finger	Stones	Loggerheads, Newcastle-under-Lyme	
	Dieu-la-Cres Abbey (remains)	Church	Leek, Staffordshire Moorlands	
	Dove Bridge	Bridge	Uttoxeter, East Staffordshire	
	Dun Low bowl barrow	Barrow	Blore with Swinscoe, Staffordshire Moorlands	
	Earthworks near Efflinch	Earthworks	Barton-under-Needwood, East Staffordshire	Centring on 320yds (300m) NW of the Junction Inn, Efflinch
	East Gate section of medieval town wall	Defences	Stafford	
	Eccleshall Castle	Castle	Eccleshall, Stafford	
	Egg Well	Well	Bradnop, Staffordshire Moorlands	
	Elderbush Cave	Cave	Wetton, Staffordshire Moorlands	
	Ellastone Bridge	Bridge	Ellastone, East Staffordshire	18th century multi-span bridge across the River Dove between the villages of Norbury and Ellastone.
	Enclosures and cursus	Enclosure	Barton-under-Needwood, East Staffordshire	300yds (270m) SE of Efflinch
	Essex Bridge, Great Haywood	Bridge	Colwich, Stafford	
	Etruscan Bone Mill	Mill	Etruria, Stoke-on-Trent	
	Fishing House of Charles Cotton, Beresford Dale	House	Alstonefield, Staffordshire Moorlands	
	Garshall moated site	Moated site	Milwich, Stafford	
	Great Haywood canal bridge No 109	Bridge	Colwich, Stafford	
	Greatgate Whipping Post	Stones	Croxden, East Staffordshire	
	Grey Friars	Settlement	Lichfield, Lichfield	
	Grub Low bowl barrow	Barrow	Waterhouses, Staffordshire Moorlands	
	Gunstone leper well	Well	Brewood and Coven, South Staffordshire	
	Hales Roman Villa	House	Loggerheads, Newcastle-under-Lyme	
	Hanging Bank bowl barrow	Barrow	Wetton, Staffordshire Moorlands	
	Hay House moated site	Moated site	Dunston, South Staffordshire	
	Heighley Castle	Castle	Madeley, Newcastle-under-Lyme	
	Hextall moated site and fishponds	Moated site	Ranton, Stafford	
	Hlaew and settlement remains at Croxall	Settlement	Edingale, Lichfield	
	Hodge Lane Manor	Moated site	Marchington, East Staffordshire	A moated site with fishponds and associated closes
	Hulton Abbey	Church	Abbey Hulton, Stoke-on-Trent	A Cistercian monastery adjacent to Leek Road
	Hyde Lea moated site and fishpond	Moated site	Coppenhall, South Staffordshire	
	Ilamtops Low bowl barrow	Barrow	Ilam, Staffordshire Moorlands	
	Kinver Edge Hillfort	Fort	Kinver, South Staffordshire	Kinver camp is a univallate hillfort
	Knightley Dale moated site	Moated site	Gnosall, Stafford	
	Lady Low bowl barrow	Barrow	Blore with Swinscoe, Staffordshire Moorlands	
	Lamber Low bowl barrow	Barrow	Waterhouses, Staffordshire Moorlands	
	Lawn Farm moated site and two ponds	Moated site	Stoke-on-Trent	
	Lea Head moated site	Moated site	Woore, Shropshire	
	Littywood moated site	Moated site	Bradley, Stafford	
	Longlow long barrow	Barrow	Wetton, Staffordshire Moorlands	
	Low bowl barrow	Barrow	Elford, Lichfield	
	Lower Booth moated site and deserted medieval village	Moated site	Blithfield, East Staffordshire	
	Lows bowl barrow	Barrow	Grindon, Staffordshire Moorlands	
	Manor house	House	Hamstall Ridware, Lichfield	
	Maple Hayes moated site	Moated site	Lichfield, Lichfield	
	Market Cross	Cross	Leek, Staffordshire Moorlands	
	Marlpit Lane bowl barrow	Barrow	Ellastone, East Staffordshire	
	Mayfield strip lynchets	Landscape	Mayfield, East Staffordshire	
	Medieval deanery, Lower Gungate	House	Tamworth	
	Merryton Low bowl barrow	Barrow	Onecote, Staffordshire Moorlands	
	Milestone	Stones	Onecote, Staffordshire Moorlands	
	Moat House moated site	Moated site	Essington, South Staffordshire	
	Moated site 150m south-west of Brewood Lodge	Moated site	Blymhill and Weston-under-Lizard, South Staffordshire	
	Moated site 160m south-west of St Michael and All Angels' Church	Moated site	Colwich, Stafford	
	Moated site 60m north-east of Little Onn Hall	Moated site	Church Eaton, Stafford	
	Moated site 80m south east of Hallwater House	Moated site	Endon and Stanley, Staffordshire Moorlands	
	Moated site 80m west of Blymhill Grange	Moated site	Blymhill and Weston-under-Lizard, South Staffordshire	
	Moated site and ancillary enclosure SW of Stafford Castle	Moated site	Hyde Lea, Stafford	
	Moated site and bloomery in Courtbanks Covert	Moated site	Cannock Wood, Cannock Chase	
	Moated site and fishpond at Moat Farm	Moated site	Gayton, Stafford	
	Moated site and fishpond at Hilderstone Hall	Moated site	Hilderstone, Stafford	200m south-west of Hilderstone Hall
	Moated site and plunge bath at The Manor House	Moated site	Fradley and Streethay, Lichfield	
	Moated site and pond at Charnes Old Hall	Moated site	Eccleshall, Stafford	
	Moated site and pond at Moor Hall Farm	Moated site	Bagnall, Staffordshire Moorlands	
	Moated site at Burnhill Green	Moated site	Pattingham and Patshull, South Staffordshire	
	Moated site at Great Hartwell Farm	Moated site	Barlaston, Stafford	
	Moated site at Moat House Farm	Moated site	Acton Trussell and Bednall, South Staffordshire	
	Moated site at Ranton Hall Farm	Moated site	Ranton, Stafford	
	Moated site at Ribden	Moated site	Farley, Staffordshire Moorlands	
	Moated site at Wood Hall Farm	Moated site	Codsall, South Staffordshire	
	Moated site in Daffodil Wood	Moated site	Stowe-by-Chartley, Stafford	
	Moated site in Reynold's Orchard	Moated site	Eccleshall, Stafford	
	Moated site of Handsacre Hall.	Moated site	Armitage with Handsacre, Lichfield	
	Moated site, four pond bays and an associated enclosure at Willoughbridge Park	Moated site	Loggerheads, Newcastle-under-Lyme	
	Monastic grange	Settlement	Waterhouses, Staffordshire Moorlands	40m south west of Musden Grange Farm
	Monks Bridge	Bridge	Stretton, East Staffordshire	
	Motte and bailey castle	Castle	Newcastle-under-Lyme	100m and 200m south of St Mary's School
	Multivallate hillfort at Berth Hill	Fort	Maer, Newcastle-under-Lyme	
	Multivallate hillfort at Bury Bank	Fort	Stone Rural, Stafford	
	NE corner tower, wall and ditch of close defences	Defences	Lichfield, Lichfield	
	Newborough Hall	Moated site	Newborough, East Staffordshire	Moated site, millpond, two fishponds and connecting channels
	Norbury Manor	Moated site	Norbury, Stafford	Moated site, 8 fishponds and connecting channels
	Ossum's Cave	Cave	Grindon, Staffordshire Moorlands	
	Over Low bowl barrow	Barrow	Stanton, East Staffordshire	
	Park Hall moated site	Moated site	Leigh, East Staffordshire	
	Paynsley Hall moated site and outer enclosure	Moated site	Draycott in the Moors, Staffordshire Moorlands	
	Pea Low bowl barrow	Barrow	Alstonefield, Staffordshire Moorlands	
	Pillaton Old Hall	House	Penkridge, South Staffordshire	
	Pit alignments near Wychnor Bridge	Landscape	Wychnor, East Staffordshire	Running NE and SW centring 320yds (300m) N of Wychnor Bridge
	Prince Rupert's Mound	Earthworks	Lichfield, Lichfield	A 17th century fieldwork
	Quarry canal bridge	Bridge	Forton, Stafford	
	Ranton Priory	Church	Ellenhall, Stafford	A moated Augustinian priory
	Remains of a 16th-century mansion and garden at Biddulph Old Hall	House	Biddulph, Staffordshire Moorlands	
	Remains of barrow cemetery	Barrow	Barton-under-Needwood, East Staffordshire	350yds (320m) SW of Tucklesholme Farm
	Ribden Low bowl barrow	Barrow	Cotton, Staffordshire Moorlands	
	Ringwork castle in Bailey's Wood	Castle	Biddulph, Staffordshire Moorlands	
	Rodbaston Old Hall moated site and fishpond	Moated site	Penkridge, South Staffordshire	
	Roman camp near Swindon iron works	Settlement	Swindon, South Staffordshire	600yds (550m) WSW of Swindon iron works
	Roman camp, Kinvaston	Settlement	Lapley, Stretton and Wheaton Aston, South Staffordshire	
	Roman camps at Greensforge	Settlement	Kinver, South Staffordshire	
	Roman fort west of Eaton House	Fort	Brewood and Coven, South Staffordshire	
	Roman site of Letocetum	Settlement	Wall, Lichfield	
	Roman villa near Engleton Hall	House	Brewood and Coven, South Staffordshire	300yds (270m) NW of Engleton Hall
	Round cairn on The Roaches	Cairn	Leekfrith, Staffordshire Moorlands	
	Round House	House	Alton, Staffordshire Moorlands	
	Round Low bowl barrow	Barrow	Grindon, Staffordshire Moorlands	
	Row Low bowl barrow	Barrow	Mayfield, East Staffordshire	
	Rye Low bowl barrow	Barrow	Sheen, Staffordshire Moorlands	
	Sandon Old Hall moated site	Moated site	Sandon and Burston, Stafford	
	Saucer barrow on Spring Hill	Barrow	Berkswich, Stafford	
	Saxon defences	Defences	Tamworth	
	Saxon's Lowe, Tittensor Common	Earthworks	Stone Rural, Stafford	
	Settlement sites and enclosures	Settlement	Fradley and Streethay, Lichfield	500yds (460m) NE of Sittles Farm
	Shenstone Park moated site	Moated site	Shenstone, Lichfield	
	Shepherd's Cross	Cross	Biddulph, Staffordshire Moorlands	250m south east of Over Hall Farm
	Simfields moated site.	Moated site	Werrington, Staffordshire Moorlands	
	Sinai Park moated site	Moated site	Branston, East Staffordshire	
	Site of Old Madeley Manor	Moated site	Madeley, Newcastle-under-Lyme	A moated site with late 16th century house, gardens and a watermill
	Site of Pennocrucium	Settlement	Lapley, Stretton and Wheaton Aston, South Staffordshire	East of Stretton Bridge
	Site of Rocester Abbey and part of Roman town	Church	Rocester, East Staffordshire	
	Site of round barrow near River Tame	Barrow	Alrewas, Lichfield	
	Springwood blast furnace	Industrial	Newcastle-under-Lyme	
	St Bertram's Bridge, Ilam	Bridge	Blore with Swinscoe, Staffordshire Moorlands	
	St Edith's Well	Well	Church Eaton, Stafford	
	St Thomas' Priory	Church	Tixall, Stafford	
	Stafford Castle and associated medieval settlement	Castle	Stafford	
	Stonesteads bowl barrow	Barrow	Waterhouses, Staffordshire Moorlands	
	Tamworth Castle	Castle	The Holloway, Lady Bank, Tamworth	
	Terrain Model of Messines	Military	Brocton, Stafford	
	Thorntree House moated site	Moated site	Uttoxeter Rural, East Staffordshire	
	Thorswood Mines	Mining	Wootton, East Staffordshire	
	Three Anglo-Scandinavian crosses in St Mary's and All Saints' churchyard	Cross	Checkley, Staffordshire Moorlands	
	Three sections of medieval town boundary	Defences	Tutbury, East Staffordshire	Located to the south and west of Tutbury
	Threelows bowl barrow	Barrow	Farley, Staffordshire Moorlands	
	Throwley Old Hall	House	Waterhouses, Staffordshire Moorlands	
	Timber circle, hengi-form monument and part of a pit alignment at Catholme	Henge	Barton-under-Needwood, East Staffordshire	
	Tinker's Lane moated site	Moated site	Marchington, East Staffordshire	
	Top Low bowl barrow	Barrow	Blore with Swinscoe, Staffordshire Moorlands	
	Top of Ecton bowl barrow	Barrow	Wetton, Staffordshire Moorlands	
	Town Low bowl barrow	Barrow	Butterton, Staffordshire Moorlands	
	Tutbury Castle	Castle	Tutbury, East Staffordshire	
	Two bowl barrows	Barrow	Warslow and Elkstones, Staffordshire Moorlands	365m south of Hillside
	Two large circular enclosures	Enclosure	Wychnor, East Staffordshire	Centring 150m SE of Baggaley's Wood
	Two moated sites at Brockhurst	Moated site	Blymhill and Weston-under-Lizard, South Staffordshire	
	Two Roman camps north of Water Eaton	Settlement	Lapley, Stretton and Wheaton Aston, South Staffordshire	
	Two Roman camps near Greensforge	Settlement	Swindon, South Staffordshire	
	Viator's Bridge	Bridge	Alstonefield, Staffordshire Moorlands	Derbyshire part scheduled separately. Also a Grade II listed building, listed separately for Staffordshire and Derbyshire.
	Waterfall Low bowl barrow	Barrow	Waterhouses, Staffordshire Moorlands	
	Webb Stone	Stones	Bradley, Stafford	
	Wetton Low bowl barrow	Barrow	Wetton, Staffordshire Moorlands	
	Woodend moated site	Moated site	Hanbury, East Staffordshire	
	World War I instruction model of a trench system	Military	Brindley Heath, Cannock Chase	Associated earthwork and building remains 850m north west of Fairoak Cottages, Cannock Chase
	Wychnor deserted medieval village	Moated site	Wychnor, East Staffordshire	Moated site, moated enclosure and two fishponds

== See also ==
- Grade I listed buildings in Staffordshire
- Grade II* listed buildings in Staffordshire
