= Achill-henge =

2011 concrete structure

Coordinates: 53.978931°N 10.099981°W

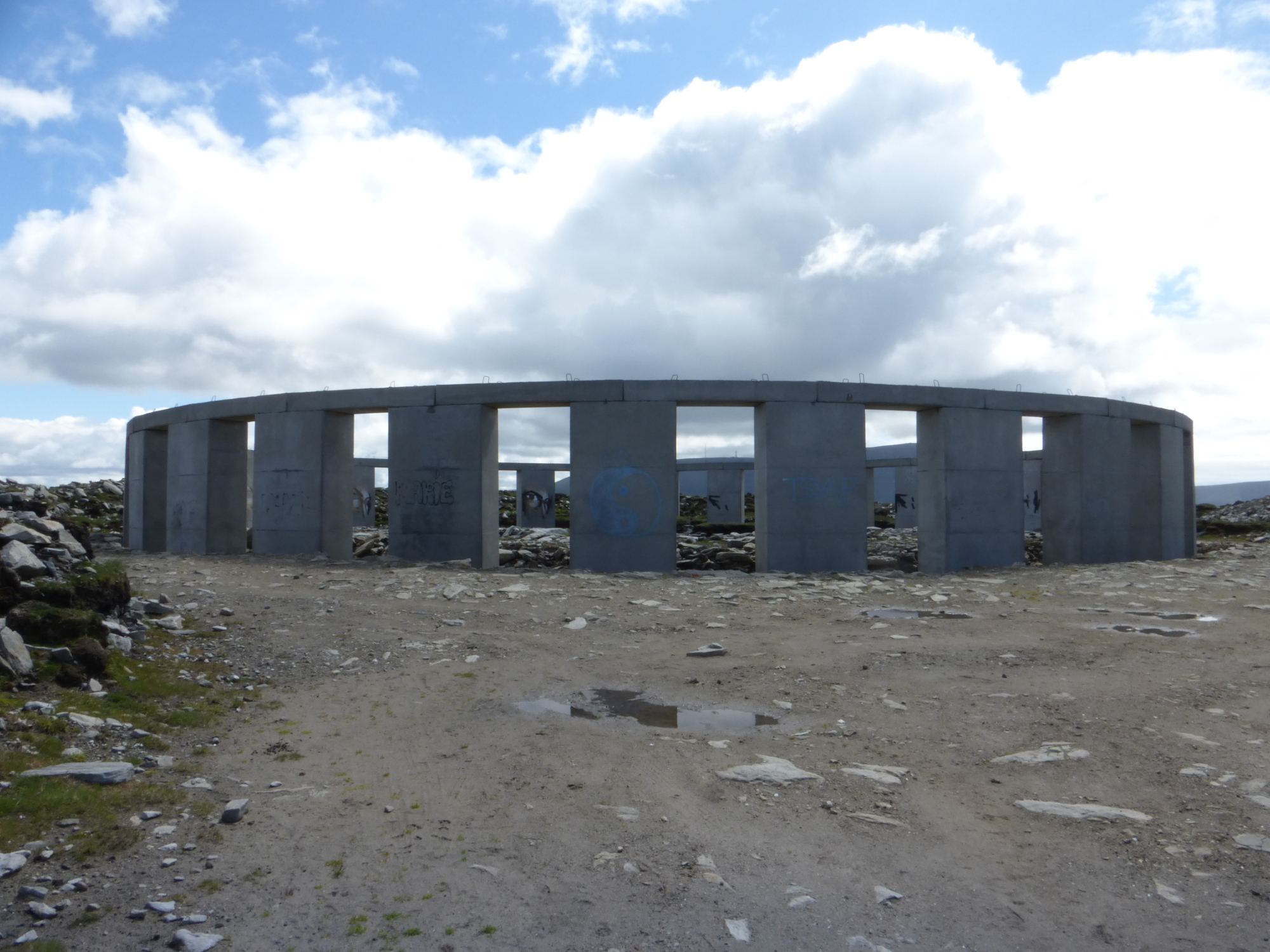
- Artist: Joe McNamara (builder)
- Year: 2011
- Medium: Concrete
- Location: Ireland

Achill-henge is a 2011 concrete structure on Achill Island off the northwest coast of County Mayo, Ireland. The term henge is used colloquially only and does not indicate any structural or cultural similarity to prehistoric monuments found in Ireland.

== Structure ==
Achill-henge is over 4 metres (13 ft) high and 100 metres (330 ft) in circumference. It consists of a circle of 30 concrete columns topped by a ring of concrete. No care was taken to replicate or reference genuine stone circles in the region or the country. The term Achill-henge can be interpreted as a reference to the cultural inaccuracy of the structure in local context as typically henges are simply referred to as stone circles in Ireland.

== History ==
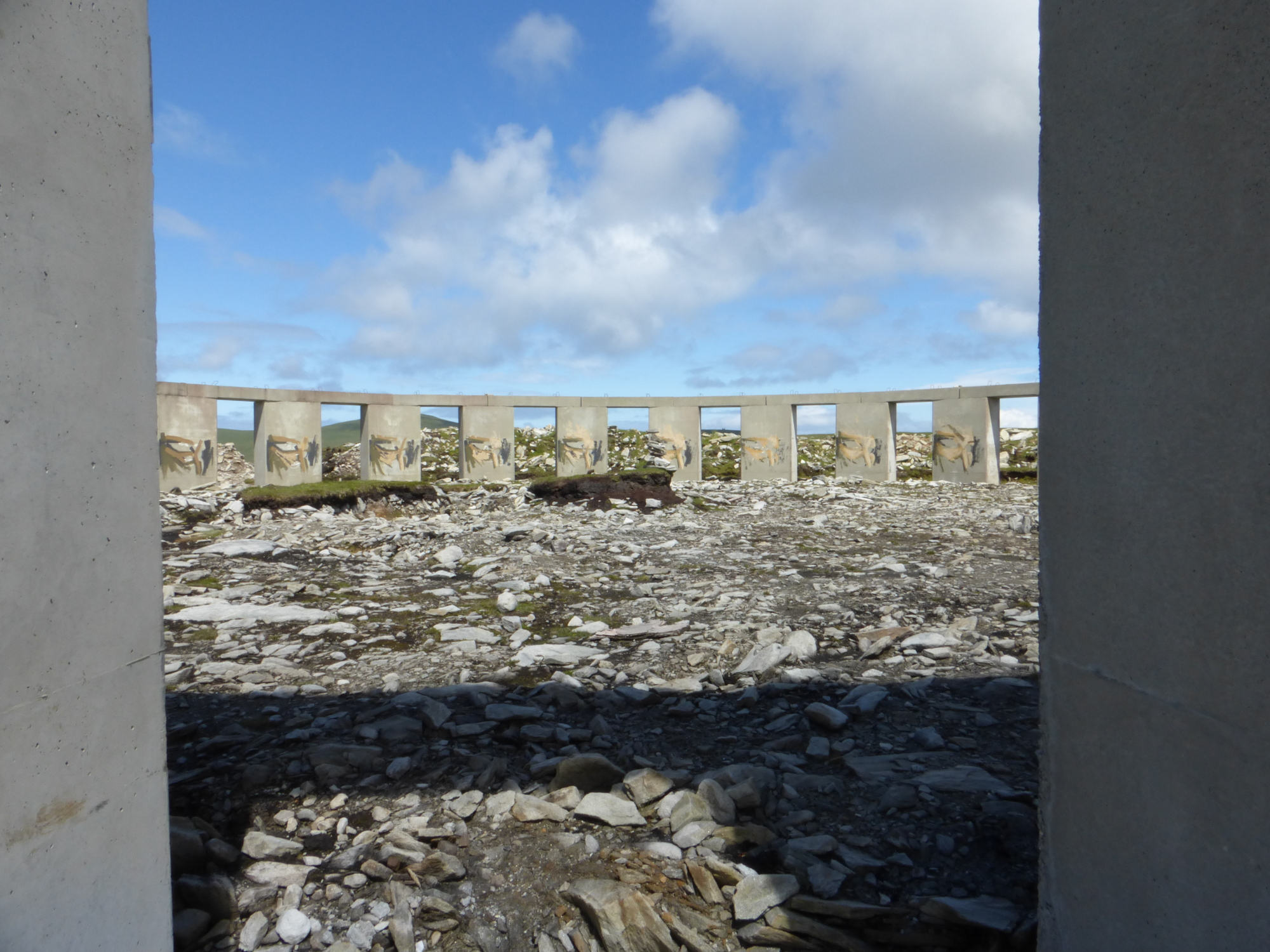
Achill Henge interior

Achill-henge was constructed over a weekend in November 2011 by Joe McNamara, a property developer. A team of workers hauled the large concrete slabs up the hill and sank them in the bog.

Mayo County Council requested a court order to force McNamara to remove the edifice as it had been built without planning permission. McNamara claimed that the structure was exempt from planning rules as an "ornamental garden".

Theresa McDonald, Director of the Achill Archaeological Field School, also raised objections on the grounds that the structure may be less than 500 m (1,600 ft) from a Bronze-Age archaeological site.

The High Court required McNamara to cease further work on the site, and as he was found to be in breach of this, upheld the council's decision.

Some local people have expressed admiration for the work as a feat of engineering, and a newspaper poll found a majority of locals in support of keeping the structure.

On 8 January 2012, it was featured as part of the Prime Time programme on RTÉ 1 in Ireland.

Achill-henge is still standing as of 10th July 2026.

== Joe McNamara ==
Joe McNamara is noted in Ireland for a series of protests against Anglo-Irish Bank and the government's handling of the Irish financial crisis. In particular, in 2010 he drove a concrete mixer truck into the gates of the Irish parliament building Leinster House, causing minor damage to the paintwork of the gateway. He was found not guilty of criminal damage or dangerous driving.

McNamara described Achill-henge as "a place of reflection".

== See also ==
In modern times a number of henge type monuments have been built, examples include:

- Maelmin henge (2000)
- Arctic Henge Raufarhöfn, Iceland (1996)
- Sark Henge (2015)
- A henge monument was restored at the Devil's Quoits in Oxfordshire between 2002 and 2008.
- "Unhenged" Brentwood Henge, also by joe mcnamara Brentwood, Essex, UK (2022)
