= Catholme ceremonial complex =

Archaeological site in Staffordshire, England

- Location within Staffordshire
- 52°44′52″N 1°42′43″W
- Type: Henge enclosure Timber circle Pit alignments
- Periods: Neolithic
- Location: Near Barton-under-Needwood, Staffordshire
- OS grid reference: SK 195 167

Scheduled monument
- Designated: 8 December 1999
- Reference no.: 1019109

The Catholme ceremonial complex is an archaeological site of the Neolithic period in Staffordshire, England, near Barton-under-Needwood. It is a scheduled monument.

== Description ==
The site is near the River Trent to the east, a short distance north of the confluence of the Trent with the River Mease and the River Tame. The features are not visible at ground level, but are visible as cropmarks seen in aerial photographs.

The postholes of a timber circle, have been detected. There are about 225 closely spaced postholes; they are positioned so that there are five concentric circles, and they are also radially aligned. The circle is about 50 metres (160 ft) in diameter. It is regarded as late Neolithic, being similar to the second phase of the southern circle of Durrington Walls near Stonehenge, and to the rings of Mount Pleasant henge in Dorset.

200 metres (660 ft) to the west, there is a henge enclosure, diameter 17 metres (56 ft), with an external ditch. It is known as the "sunburst" monument, since there are 12 lines of up to five postholes outside the ditch, aligned with the centre of the circle. The overall diameter is 60 metres (200 ft).

About 50 metres (160 ft) to the north and south of the timber circle and "sunburst" monument are pit alignments running west–east, over 1 kilometre (0.62 mi) long.

== Investigation ==
The site was investigated by Birmingham Archaeology from 2002 to 2004, involving a geophysical survey, Lidar and excavation. As a result, the sequence in which the features were built has been suggested. It is thought that the radiating pit alignments are the earliest parts of the "sunburst" monument; the circular ditch was built later; about 2500 BC it was made into a segmented enclosure, and the timber circle, displaying upright oak posts, was built about this time. About 500 years later, an individual was buried in the centre of the "sunburst" monument, with grave goods including Beaker pottery. The pit alignments to the north and south are thought to be less ancient, perhaps late Bronze Age, built as though to respect the earlier monuments.
