= Cairnpapple Hill =

Hill in Scotland

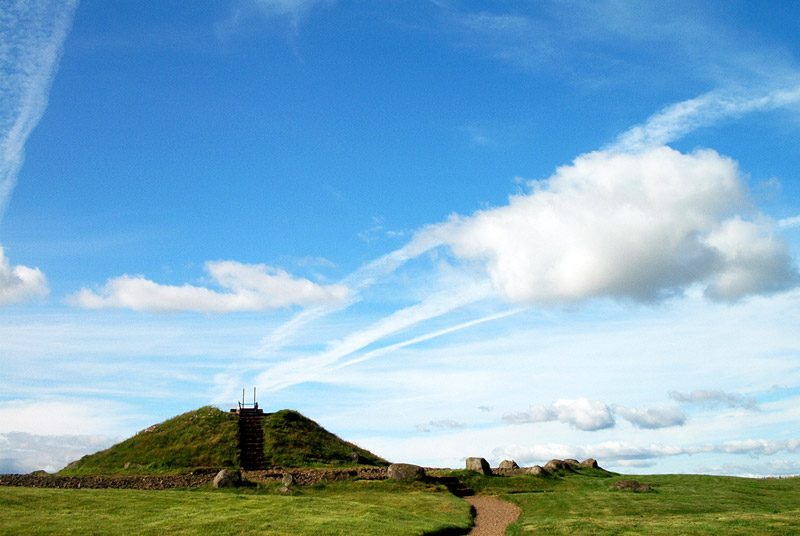
- Burial mound on Cairnpapple Hill

Highest point
- Elevation: 312 m (1,024 ft)
- Prominence: c. 173 metres (568 ft)
- Coordinates: 55°55′41″N 3°37′21″W

Geography
- Cairnpapple Hill in Scotland Cairnpapple Hill in West Lothian
- Location: West Lothian, Scotland
- OS grid: NS987718
- Topo map: OS Landranger 65

Cairnpapple Hill is a hill with a dominating position in central lowland Scotland with views from coast to coast. It was used and re-used as a major ritual site for around 4,000 years, and in its day would have been comparable to better known sites like the Standing Stones of Stenness. The summit lies 312 meters above sea level, and is about 2 miles (3 km) north of Bathgate. In the 19th century the site was completely concealed by trees, then in 1947–1948 excavations by Stuart Piggott found a series of ritual monuments from successive prehistoric periods. In 1998, Gordon Barclay re-interpreted the site for Historic Scotland. It is designated a scheduled ancient monument.

== History ==
Neolithic rituals began around 3500 BC with signs of small hearths, and precious objects left on the hill, presumably as offerings, including fine pottery bowls and stone axe heads imported from Cumbria and Wales.

Probably around 3000 BC a Class II henge was constructed with the hilltop being surrounded by a bank outside a ditch about 12 ft (4 m) wide cut over 3 ft (1 m) into the rock, with wide entrances from north and south. Inside this an egg-shaped setting of 24 uprights (thought to have been timber posts, or possibly standing stones) enclosed an inner setting of similar uprights.

Some time later a Bronze Age ritual added a small stone and clay cairn just off-centre inside the monument, with a 7 ft (2 m) high standing stone to the east and a setting of smaller stones. Also aligned to this cairn were sockets for three upright stones at the centre of an arc of seven small pits, six of which contained cremated bones and two contained remains of bone skewer pins. Under the cairn traces were found of at least one burial, with wooden objects (perhaps a mask and club) and beaker people style pottery which indicates a date around 2000 BC.

This cairn was later covered by a second much larger cairn about 50 ft (15 m) across and several yards (metres) high, with a kerb of massive stone slabs, which incorporated Bronze Age burial cists, one of which contained a food vessel pot. Subsequently, more stone was brought in to increase this cairn to about 100 ft (30 m) diameter, enclosing two cremation burials in inverted urns and now covering the original ditch and bank, making the whole site a tomb monument. Lastly, inside the ditch to the east four graves considered Iron Age are now thought to be early Christian because of their east-west alignment, and are dated to around 500 to 1000. Hilderston in the valley to the east was the site of a large but short-lived mining operation following the discovery of silver in 1606.

== Present day ==
The site is open to the public April to September and has a small visitor centre. The 1940s excavations have been partly covered by a concrete dome replicating the second cairn (although the dome is much higher than the cairn) so that visitors can go inside what was once a solid cairn and see the reconstructed graves, and outside this the surrounding post holes and graves are marked by being filled with colour-coded gravel like an archaeological plan, with the red gravel indicating upright pits, and the white gravel denoting the alleged Christian burials. The current display attempts to show all the main phases of the site at the same time.

Cairnpapple Hill is the 445th highest Marilyn (sub 2000' peaks) in Scotland (Out of 571 total Marilyns) - the true top is to the south beside a trig point.

== Derivation of the name ==
Although there is still some confusion about the origin of the name Cairnpapple Hill, or the alternative Cairniepapple, its meaning can be guessed to a certain extent. It is uncertain whether the name comes from a Brythonic language, related to Welsh; a Goidelic one, such as Scottish Gaelic; or a mixture of the two. The first part, cairn- means cairn, either from Brythonic (e.g. Welsh carn) or Goidelic (e.g. Gaelic càrn or càirn). The second part -ie-, means of the, as in Welsh y or Gaelic a'. The third part is the most problematic, possibly meaning any of tent (Welsh pabell, Gaelic puball), people/congregation (Welsh pob(o)l, Gaelic pobull), or even eye (compare Old Welsh pubell). Thus, Cairniepapple is most likely to mean Cairn of the tent, Cairn of the people, or Cairn of the eye.

== Gallery ==
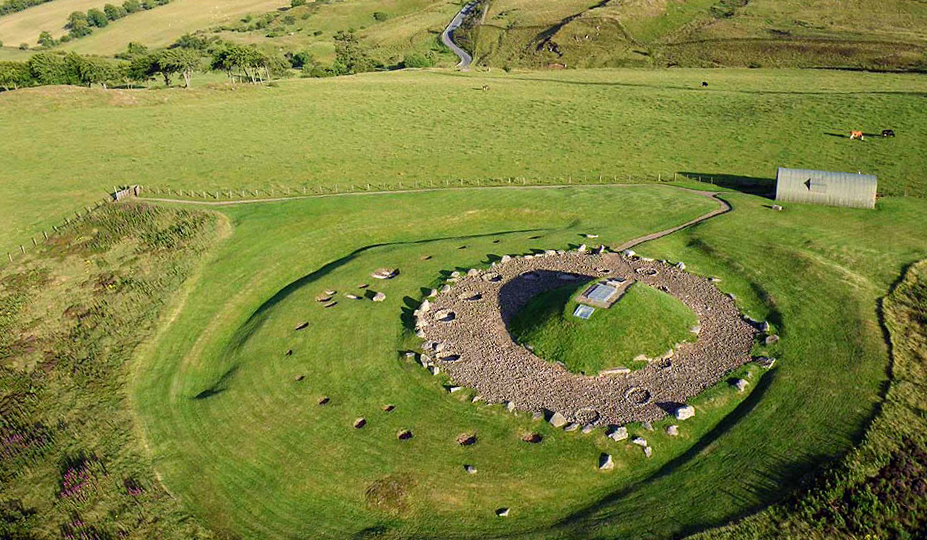
Kite aerial photo of Cairnpapple Hill: henge and cairn

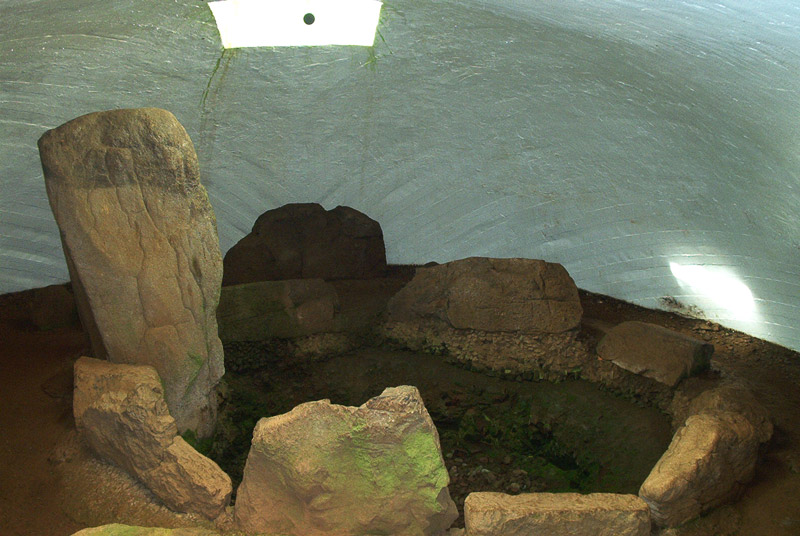
Interior of modern cairn

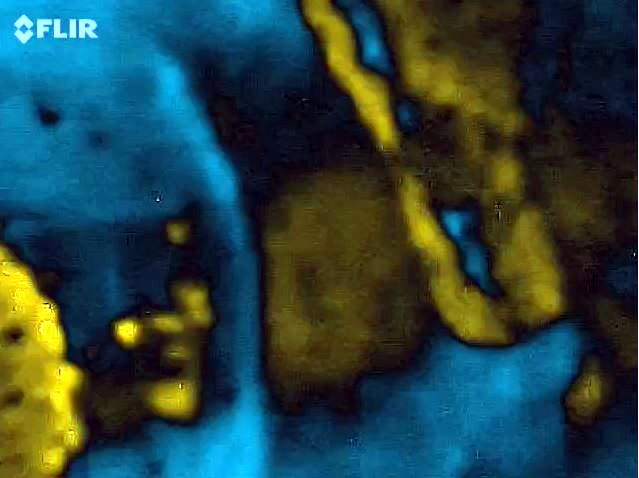
A kite aerial thermogram of a wide thermal anomaly, with roughly parallel sides, radiating out from the eastern side of the henge, captured in darkness at 23-21pm
