= Henge =

Type of Neolithic earthwork

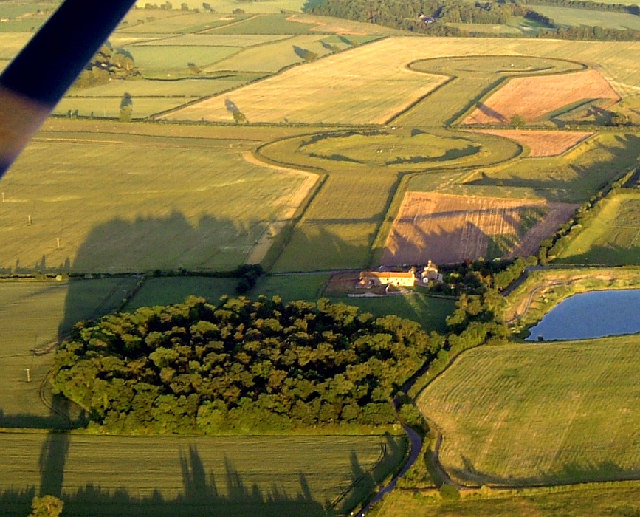
The three aligned henges of the Thornborough Henges complex

A henge can be one of three related types of Neolithic earthwork. The essential characteristic of all three is that they feature a ring-shaped bank and ditch, with the ditch inside the bank. Because the internal ditches would have served defensive purposes poorly, henges are not considered to have been defensive constructions (cf. circular rampart).

The three henge types (figures in brackets indicate the approximate diameter of the central flat area) are:

1. Henge (> 20 m (65 ft)). The word henge refers to a particular type of earthwork of the Neolithic period, typically consisting of a roughly circular or oval-shaped bank with an internal ditch surrounding a central flat area of more than 20 m (66 ft) in diameter. There is typically little if any evidence of occupation in a henge, although they may contain ritual structures such as stone circles, timber circles and coves. Henge monument is sometimes used as a synonym for henge. Henges sometimes, but by no means always, featured stone or timber circles, and circle henge is sometimes used to describe these structures. The three largest stone circles in Britain (Avebury, the Great Circle at Stanton Drew stone circles, and the Ring of Brodgar) are each within a henge. Examples of henges without significant internal monuments are the three henges of Thornborough Henges. Although having given its name to the word henge, Stonehenge is atypical in that the ditch is outside the main earthwork bank.
2. Hengiform monument (5–20 m (15–65 ft)). Like an ordinary henge, except the central flat area is between 5 and 20 m (16–66 ft) in diameter, they comprise a modest earthwork with a fairly wide outer bank. The terms mini-henge (also minihenge) or Dorchester henge are sometimes used as synonyms for hengiform monument. An example is the Neolithic site at Wormy Hillock Henge.
3. Henge enclosure (> 300 m (1,000 ft)). A Neolithic ring earthwork with the ditch inside the bank, with the central flat area having abundant evidence of occupation and usually being more than 300 m (980 ft) in diameter. Some true henges are as large as this (e.g., Avebury), but lack evidence of domestic occupation. Mega henge, Super-henge or superhenge is sometimes used as a synonym for a henge enclosure. Sometimes the term is used to indicate size alone rather than use, e.g. "Marden henge ... is the least understood of the four British 'superhenges' (the others being Avebury, Durrington Walls and Mount Pleasant Henge)".

== Etymology ==
The word henge is a backformation from Stonehenge, the famous monument in Wiltshire. The term was first coined in 1932 by Thomas Kendrick, who later became the Keeper of British Antiquities at the British Museum. A broader usage of henge to refer to standing-stone monuments was recorded in Yorkshire in 1740, from Old English usage dating to at least the 10th century, with a root of either hencg 'hinge', or hen(c)en 'to hang, to suspend'.

Stonehenge is not a true henge, as its ditch runs outside its bank, although there is a small extant external bank as well.

== Forms ==
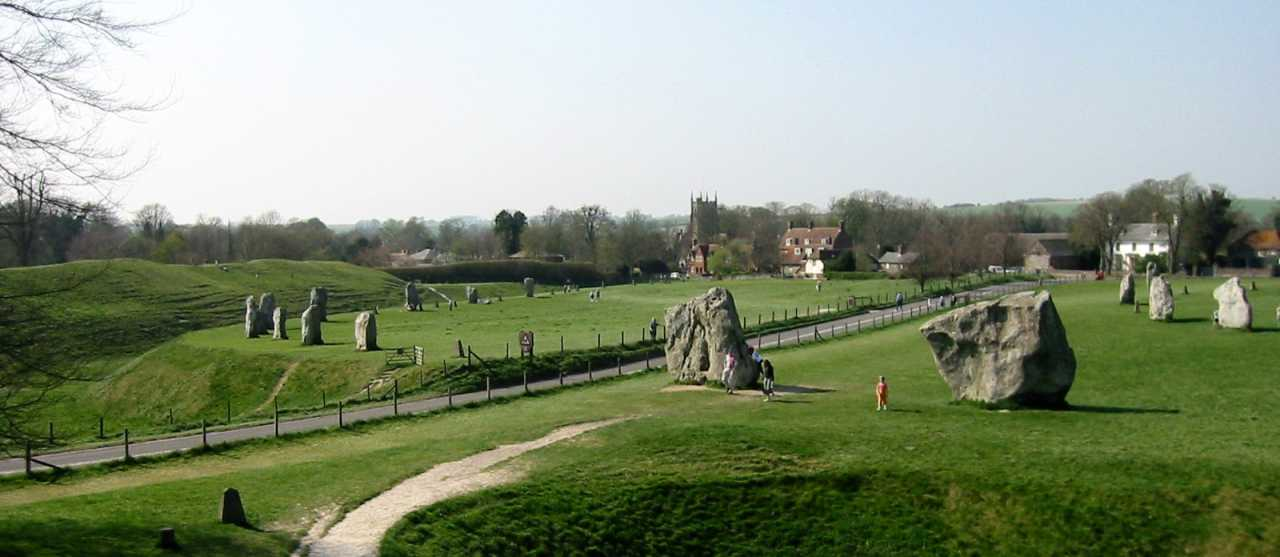
Avebury henge contains several stone circles

Henges may be classified as follows:

- Class I henges, which have a single entrance created from a gap in the bank;
- Class II henges which have two entrances, diametrically opposite each other;
- Class III henges, which have four entrances, facing each other in pairs.

Sub groups exist for these when two or three internal ditches are present rather than one. Henges are usually associated with the Late Neolithic or Early Bronze Age, and especially with the pottery of this period: Grooved Ware, Impressed Wares (formerly known as Peterborough Ware), and Beakers. Sites such as Stonehenge also provide evidence of activity from the later Bronze Age Wessex culture.

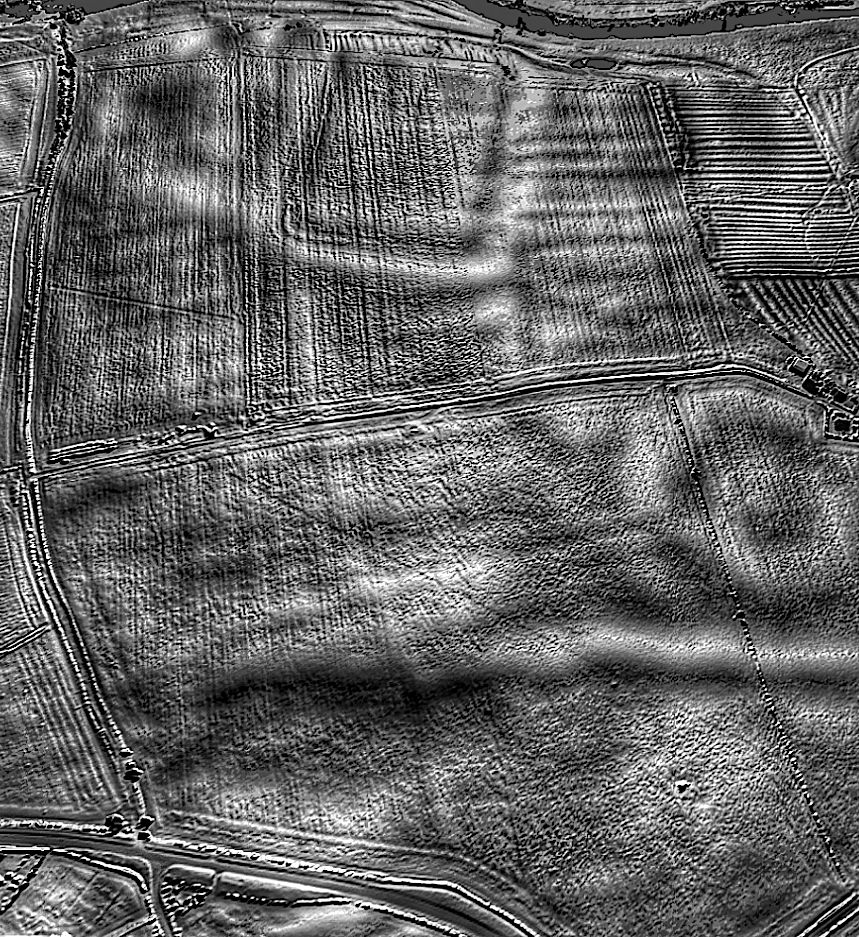
A lidar view of the henge and the site of two Roman forts at Newton Kyme in North Yorkshire

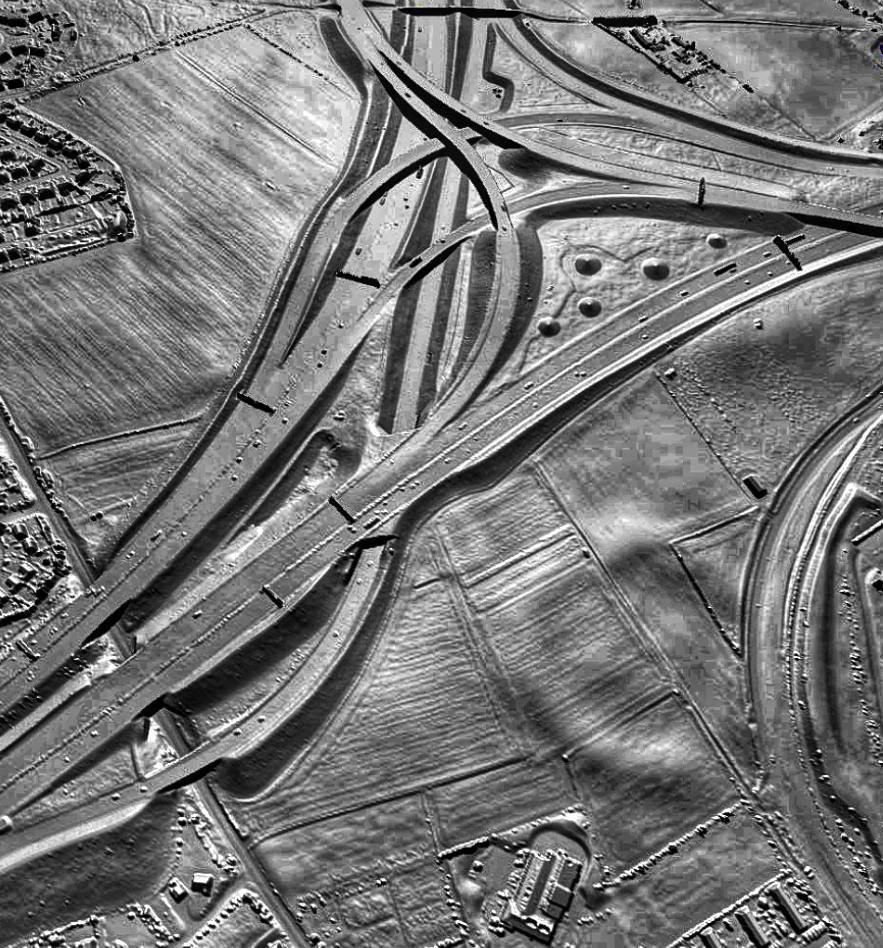
A lidar view of Ferrybridge Henge in West Yorkshire

Henges often contain evidence of a variety of internal features, including timber or stone circles, pits, or burials, which may pre- or post-date the henge enclosure. A henge should not be confused with a stone circle within it, as henges and stone circles can exist together or separately. At Arbor Low in Derbyshire, all the stones except one are laid flat and do not seem to have been erected, as no stone holes have been found. Elsewhere, often only the stone holes remain to indicate a former circle.

Some of the best-known henges are at:

- Avebury, about 20 miles (32 km) north of Stonehenge on Salisbury Plain, in Wiltshire
- Knowlton Circles, henge complex in Dorset
- Maumbury Rings in Dorset (later reused as a Roman amphitheatre and then as a Civil War fort)
- Mayburgh Henge in Cumbria
- The Ring of Brodgar in Orkney
- Thornborough Henges complex in Yorkshire

Henges sometimes formed part of a ritual landscape or complex, with other Neolithic and Bronze Age monuments inside and outside the henge. Earlier monuments associated with a later henge might include Neolithic monuments such as a cursus (e.g., at Thornborough Henges the central henge overlies the cursus), or a long barrow, such as the West Kennet Long Barrow at Avebury, Wiltshire, or, as in the case of Stonehenge, Mesolithic post holes. A circle of large pits c. 2 km (1 1/4 mi) across is centered on Durrington Walls henge. Later monuments added after the henge was built might include Bronze Age cairns as at Arbor Low.

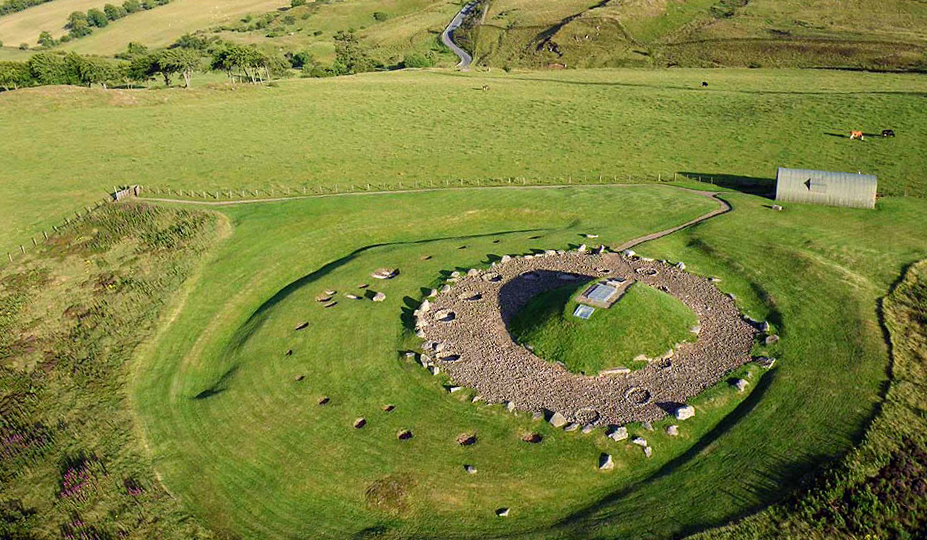
An aerial view of the henge site and cairn on Cairnpapple Hill in West Lothian

Examples of such ritual landscapes are:

- Balfarg in Fife, Scotland
- Dunragit archaeological excavation site in Wigtownshire
- Heart of Neolithic Orkney, the UNESCO World Heritage Site on the Mainland, one of the islands of Orkney, Scotland
- Stonehenge, Avebury and Associated Sites, the UNESCO World Heritage Site located in Wiltshire, England
- already mentioned: Arbor Low, Knowlton Circles, Stanton Drew stone circles, and Thornborough Henges

Burials have been recorded at a number of excavated henges, both pre-dating the henge and as a result of secondary reuse. For example:

- At Avebury, at least two very disturbed inhumations were found in the central area
- Cairnpapple and North Mains both had some burials that pre-date the henges, as well others that post-date them
- At King Arthur's Round Table, Cumbria, a cremation trench lay within the monument
- At Woodhenge, a central burial of a child was interpreted by its excavators as a dedicatory offering
- At Maxey, two cremation pit circles in the southern half of the henge, burials was also present within this monument

== Origin and distribution ==
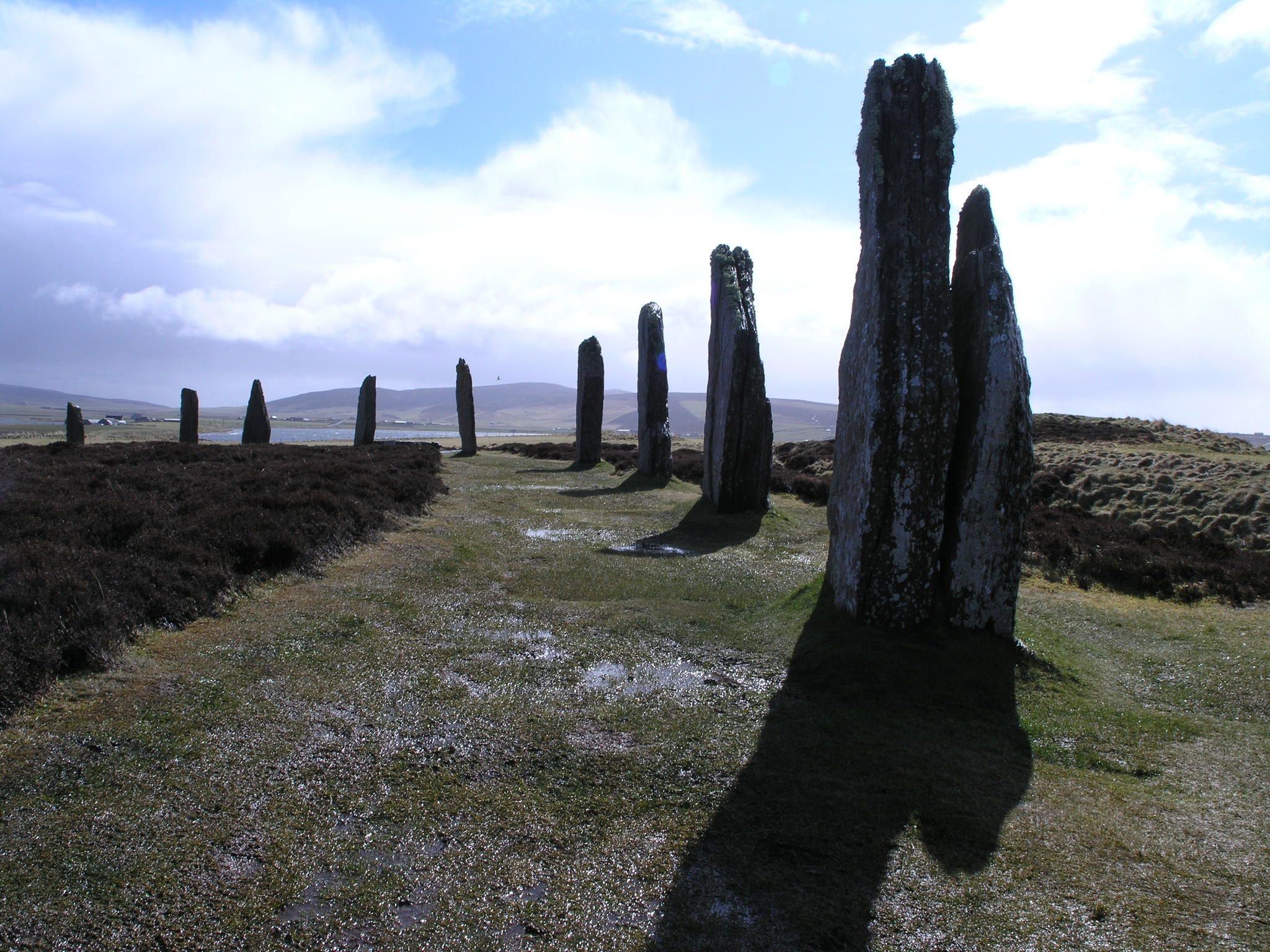
The Ring of Brodgar, Orkney, is a possible area of origin for henges

Efforts to delineate a direct lineage for the henge from earlier enclosures have not been conclusive. Their chronological overlap with older structures makes it difficult to classify them as a coherent tradition. They seem to take the concept of creating a space separate from the outside world one step further than the causewayed enclosure, and they focus attention on an internal point. In some cases, the construction of the bank and ditch was a stage that followed other activity on the site. At Balfarg, North Mains, and Cairnpapple, for example, earlier cremations and deliberate smashing of pottery predate the enclosure.

Concentrations of henges occur over much of Britain. Orkney (Cunliffe 2001) and Wessex (Burl 1969) have both been suggested as the original provenance of the monument type; however, others remain unconvinced (Barclay 2005). Unlike earlier enclosure monuments, henges were not usually built on hilltops but on low-lying ground, often close to watercourses and good agricultural land.

Some scholars, such as the editors of the 1982 edition of the Penguin Dictionary of Archaeology (Bray and Trump, 1982), have claimed that henges are unique to the British Isles. They state that similar, much earlier, circles on the European continent, such as Goseck circle (which has no bank), and later ones such as Goloring are not proper "henges". But The Penguin Archaeological Guide (Bahn, 2001) does not comment on geographical locations for henges.

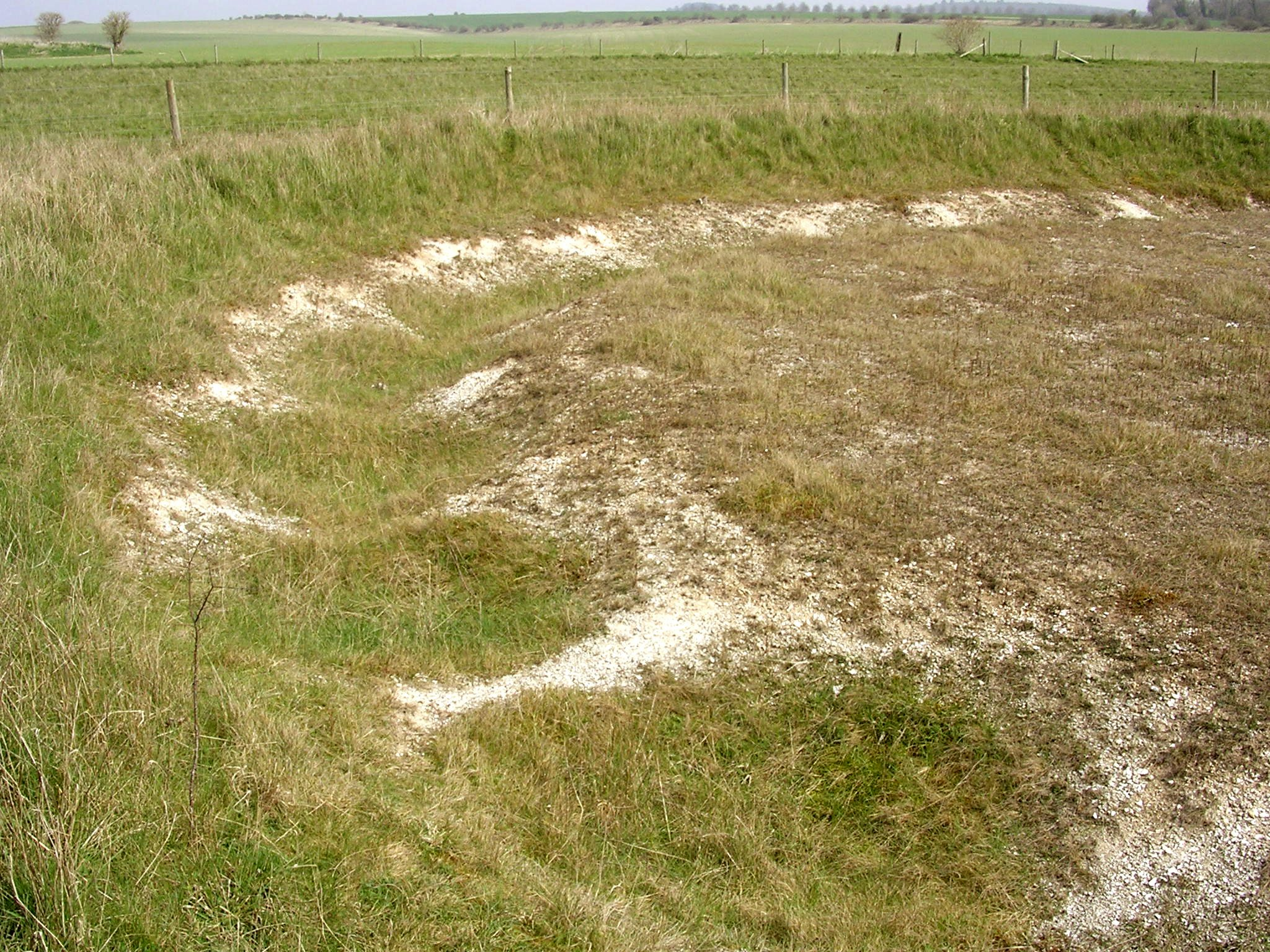
Excavated henge ditch on Wyke Down (Dorset). The ditch was originally dug as a causewayed enclosure and may therefore not be a henge.

Julian Cope, in The Megalithic European, proposes that the henge was a regional development from the Europe-wide causewayed enclosure. He notes it appeared following a cultural upheaval in around 3000 BC, which inspired the peoples of Neolithic Europe to develop more independently. He notes the rondel enclosures of Bavaria's Isar Valley, which according to investigations by the German archaeologist R. A. Maier, "drew comparisons with the henge monuments and causewayed enclosures of the British Isles." Although still with a multiple-causewayed ditch and entrances at cardinal points, the roundels are described by John Hodgson (2003) as not being positioned with defensive aims in mind. The largest, at Kothingeichendorf, appeared to be "midway between a henge and a causewayed enclosure".

Alasdair Whittle (2005) also views the development of the henge as a regional variation within a European tradition that included a variety of ditched enclosures. He notes that henges and the grooved ware pottery often found at them are two examples of the British Neolithic not found on the Continent. Caroline Malone (2001) also says that henges were not built in the rest of Western Europe, but they developed from a broader tradition of enclosure to become "a phenomenon of the British Isles, a native tradition with sophisticated architecture and calendrical functions."

== Interpretation ==
Henges may have been used for rituals or astronomical observation rather than day-to-day activity. That their ditches are located inside their banks indicates that they were not used for defence, and that the barrier of the earthworks was more likely symbolic than functional. Following arguments presented for Irish Iron Age enclosures, Barclay suggested that they are 'defensive': that the ditch and bank face something 'dangerous' inside the enclosure. He has also suggested that the considerable range of elements surrounded by the earthworks, and the very long date range, are because henges were designed mainly to enclose pre-existing ceremonial sites that were seen as 'ritually charged' and therefore dangerous to people. It has been conjectured that whatever took place inside the enclosures was intended to be separate from the outside world and perhaps known only to select individuals or groups.

The alignment of henges is a contentious issue. Popular belief is that their entrances point towards certain heavenly bodies. But henge orientation is highly variable and may have been determined more by local topography than by desire for symbolic orientation. Statistical analysis showed that Class I henges have a slight tendency to have an entrance set in the north or north-east quarter. Class II henges generally have their axes aligned approximately south-east to north-west or north-east to south-west.

It has been suggested that the stone and timber structures sometimes built inside henges were used as solar declinometers to measure the position of the rising or setting sun. These structures do not appear in all henges; and when they do, often they are considerably more recent than the henges. Thus, they are not necessarily connected with the henge's original function. It has been conjectured that the henges would have been used to synchronize a calendar to the solar cycle for purposes of planting crops or timing religious rituals. Some henges have poles, stones or entrances that indicate the position of the rising or setting sun during the equinoxes and solstices, while others appear to frame certain constellations. Additionally, many are placed so that nearby hills either mark or do not interfere with such observations. Finally, some henges appear to be placed at particular latitudes. For example, a number are placed at a latitude of 55 degrees north, where the same two markers can indicate the rising and setting sun for both the spring and autumn equinoxes. But as henges are present from the extreme north to the extreme south of Britain, their latitude could not have been of great importance.

Formalisation is commonly attributed to henges: indications of the builders' concerns to control the arrival at, entrance into, and movement within the enclosures. This was achieved by placing flanking stones or avenues at the entrances of some henges, or by dividing the internal space with timber circles. While some henges were the first monuments to be built in their areas, others were added to already important landscapes, especially the larger examples.

The concentric nature of many of the internal features, such as the five rings of postholes at Balfarg or the six at Woodhenge, may represent a finer distinction than the inside-out differences suggested by henge earthworks. The ordering of space and the circular movement suggested by the sometimes densely packed internal features indicates a sophisticated degree of spatial understanding.

== Hengiform monument ==
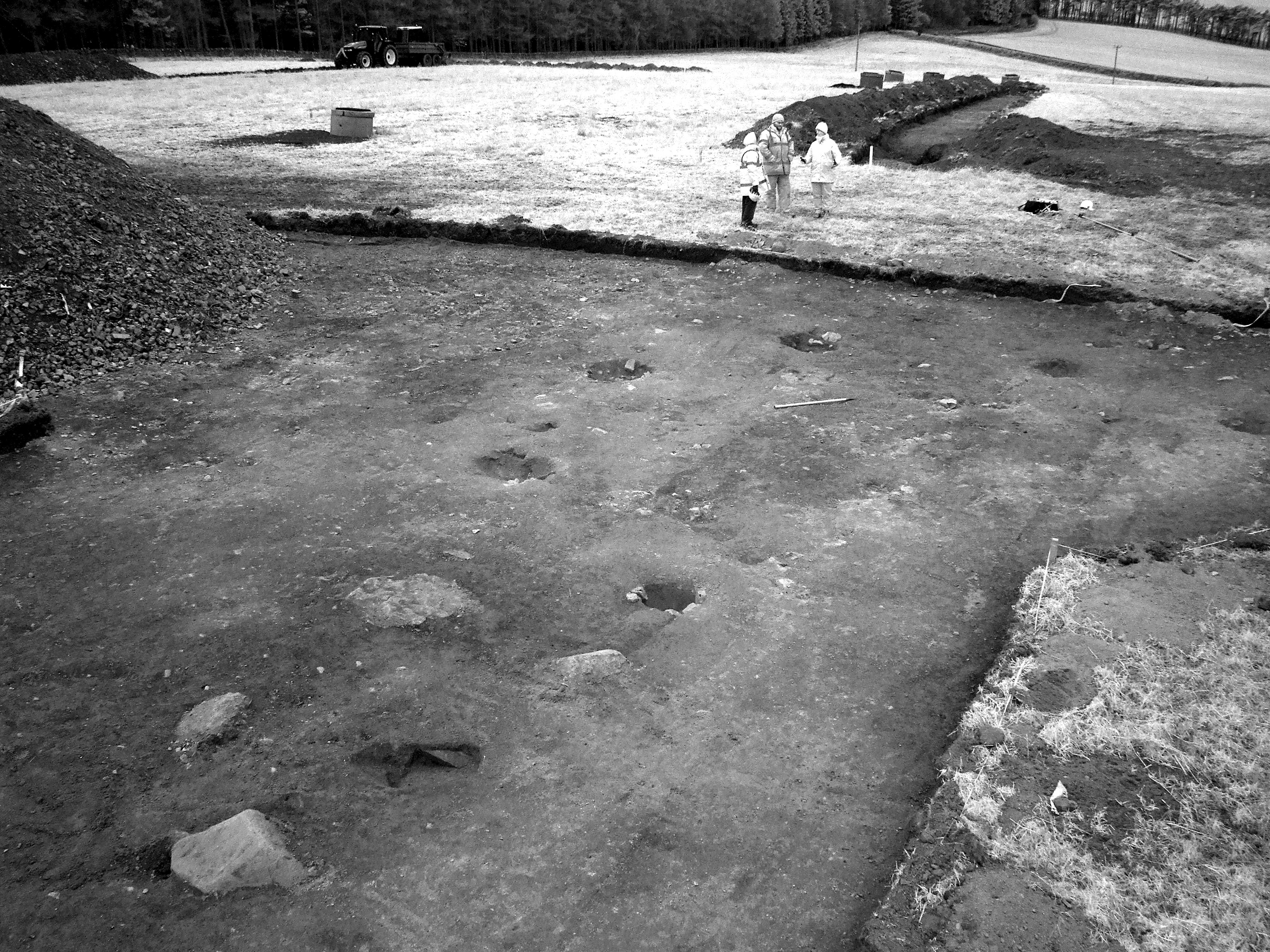
A near infrared image of the site of a prehistoric timber circle at Beecraigs in West Lothian

Hengiform monuments, or mini henges, are distributed throughout England and mainland Scotland (with examples as far north as Caithness), though no examples have been found in Wales. Pits, cremations, postholes, stone-sockets, and graves have been found within them, and postholes and cremation pits have also been found to be present close to the site in some cases. They typically have either one entrance or two opposing entrances. In plan, a mini henge can be mistaken for a ploughed-out round barrow, although the former tend to be slightly larger and their earthworks more substantial. As with ordinary henges, they are thought to have served ritual purposes and are thought to be of late Neolithic date.

== Henge enclosure ==
Henge enclosures often contain or lie close to one or more ordinary henges. Finds of animal bone, grooved ware pottery, and evidence of dwellings have been found and coupled with the time and energy needed to build them, it is considered that they must have been important social centres analogous to tribal capitals. Two or four evenly spaced entrances lead through the earthwork to the centre.

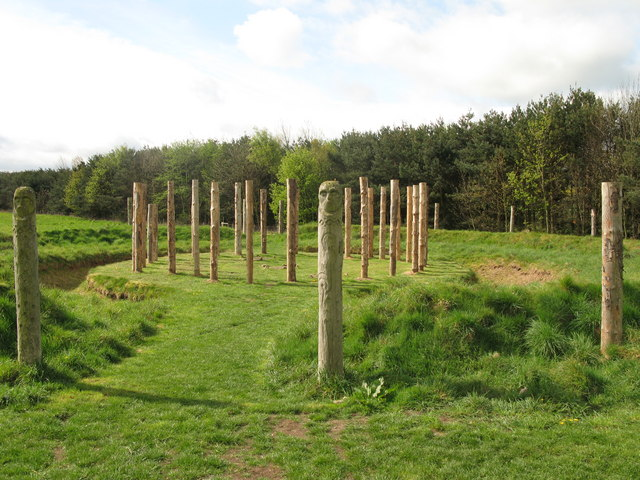
Maelmin Henge, constructed in 2000

== Modern henge monuments ==
A henge monument was restored at the Devil's Quoits in Oxfordshire between 2002 and 2008.

In modern times a number of henge type monuments have been built, examples include:

- Maelmin henge (2000)
- Arctic Henge Raufarhöfn, Iceland (1996)
- Achill-henge (2011), Ireland
- Sark Henge, Sark, Channel Islands (2015)

== See also ==
- Archaeoastronomy
- Calendar
- Circular ditches
- Circular rampart
- Dolmen
- European megalithic culture
- Megalith
- Menhir
- Pit alignments
- Sundial

== Bibliography ==
- Atkinson, R. J. C. (1951) The henge monuments of Great Britain.
- Thomas, J. (2004) Understanding the Neolithic, Routledge, London.
