= Wormy Hillock Henge =

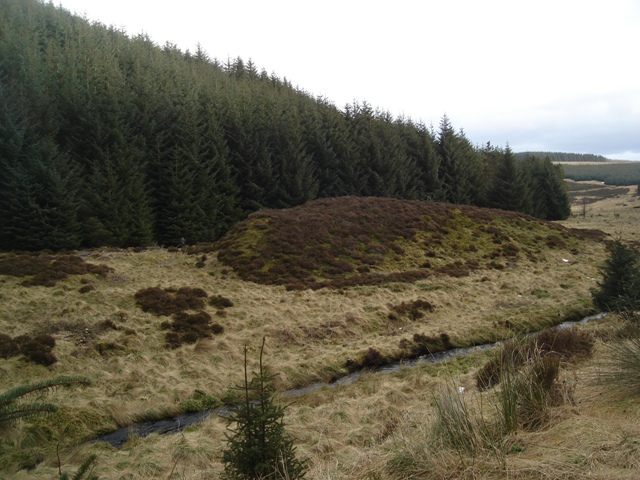
- A picture of the mound; the henge lies in the left half of the photo
- Interactive map of Wormy Hillock Henge
- Location: Aberdeenshire, Scotland
- Coordinates: 57°21′48.32″N 2°55′3.40″W
- Built: During the Neolithic Period
- Architectural style: British pre-Roman Architecture

Scheduled monument
- Official name: Wormy Hillock, henge
- Type: Prehistoric ritual and funerary: henge
- Designated: 6 July 1973
- Reference no.: SM3278

Wormy Hillock Henge, also known as The Dragon's Grave, is a small henge in Aberdeenshire, Scotland. It is a scheduled monument located in the Clashindarroch Forest. It is a low, circular bank 16.5 metres (54 ft) in diameter which almost surrounds a 6-metre (20 ft) wide platform in the centre. There is one gap in the bank at the southeast end of the henge.

== History ==
In 1891, James Macdonald, thinking that this mound was a "round for sheep", excavated the mound. However, this did not bring any archaeological finds.

== Legend ==
According to legend, Wormy hillock henge was the location of a buried dragon or monster. In the legend, the dragon had been attacking villages in the neighbourhood, and the villagers eventually succeeded in killing the dragon. They then half-buried its corpse and mounded dirt over it, making a mound. This legend is the source of the names of the mound: Wormy Hillock Henge and The Dragon's Grave.

== The site ==
The henge is located to the south of the mound known as Wormy Hillock, on a haugh ("a piece of flat alluvial land by the side of a river", according to the Oxford English Dictionary) in a steep valley in the Clashindarroch Forest. The henge comprises a circular bank, 16.5 metres (54 ft) in diameter, enclosing an oval area 13.5 metres (44 ft) long by 13 metres (43 ft) wide. The bank itself ranges from 3 metres (9.8 ft) broad and 10 centimetres (3.9 in) high up to 4 metres (13 ft) thick and 60 centimetres (24 in) high. Wormy Hillock falls into the sub-category 'mini-henge' or 'hengiform' as it is less than 20m in diameter (see henge main article). The area enclosed by the bank is around 140 square metres (1,500 ft^{2}), and the average for a stone circle is around 260 square metres (2,800 ft^{2}).

Inside the bank is a small platform 6 metres (20 ft) in diameter surrounded by a 1 metre (3.3 ft) deep ditch crossed by several causeways. The southeastern one is apparently related to the 1 metre (3.3 ft) wide hole in the bank at the same angular position. This site is similar to several others in Dorchester, Oxon, England. There are two small pits on the bank, and they may be much more recent than the rest of the mound. A large boulder is lying in the ditch right below one of the pits.

Currently, the site is completely overgrown by grass and heather.

== Gallery ==
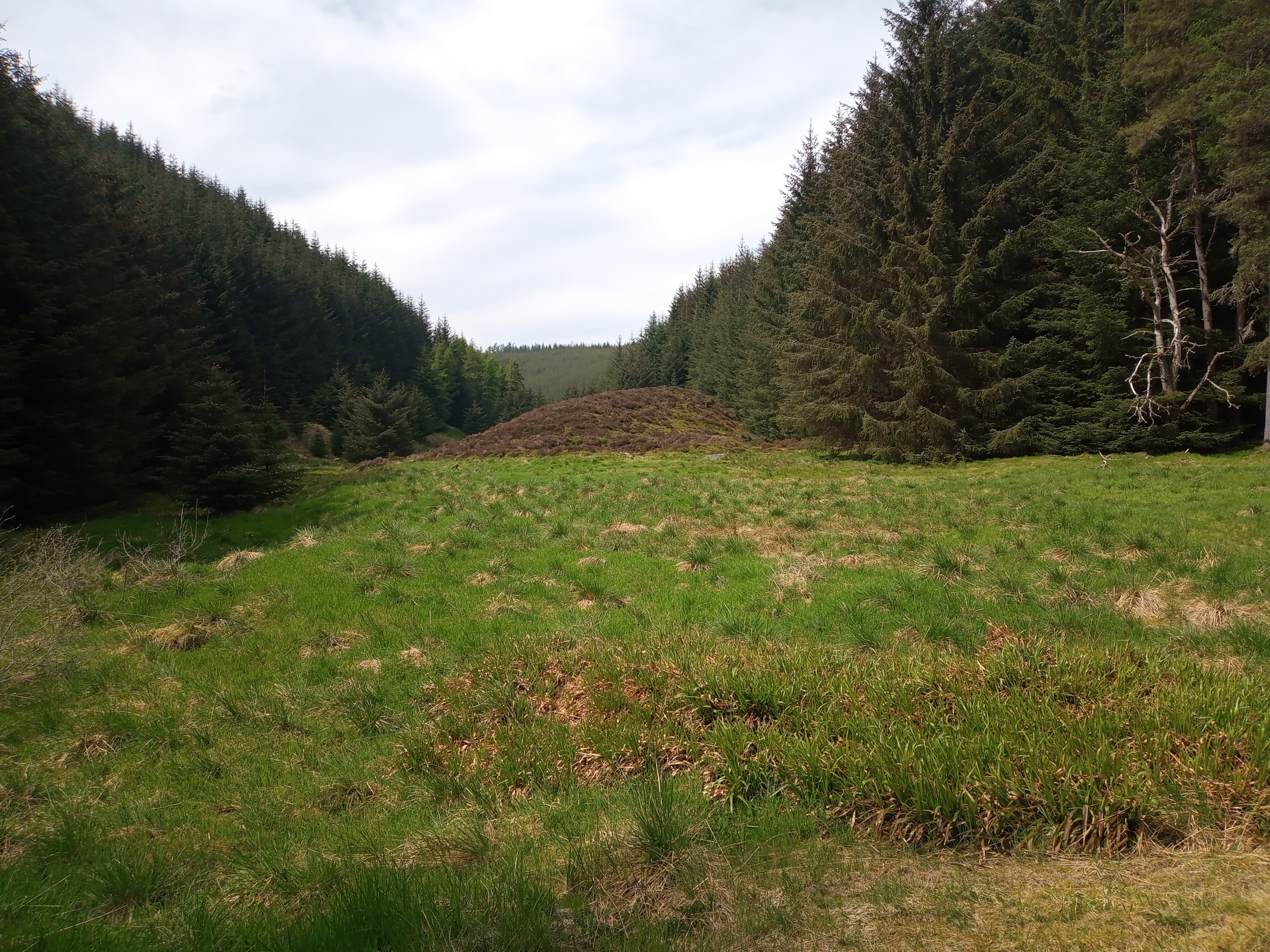
A front view of the burial mound, showing the small valley plain.

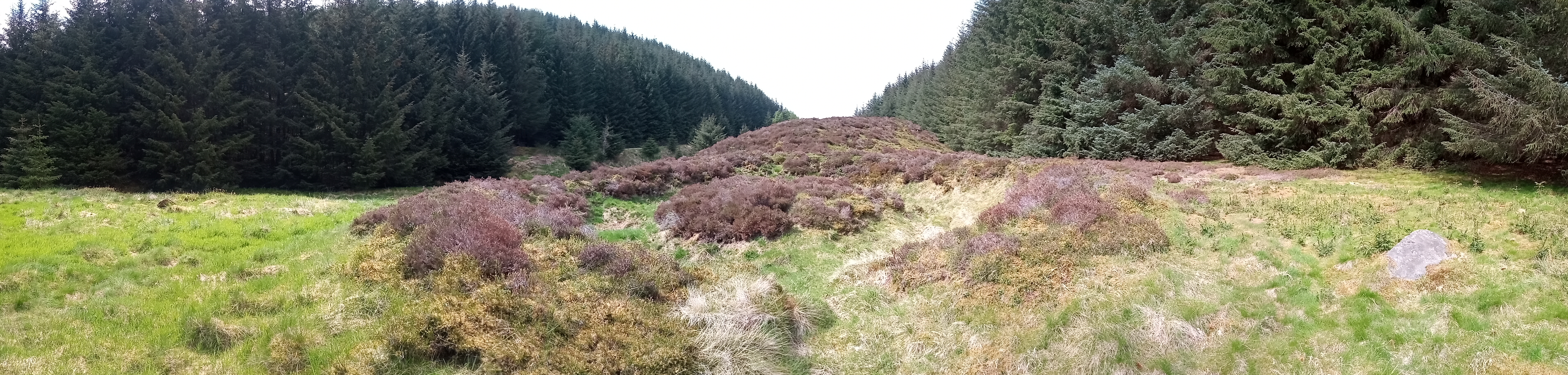
A panoramic photograph showing the circular bank in front of the burial mound.

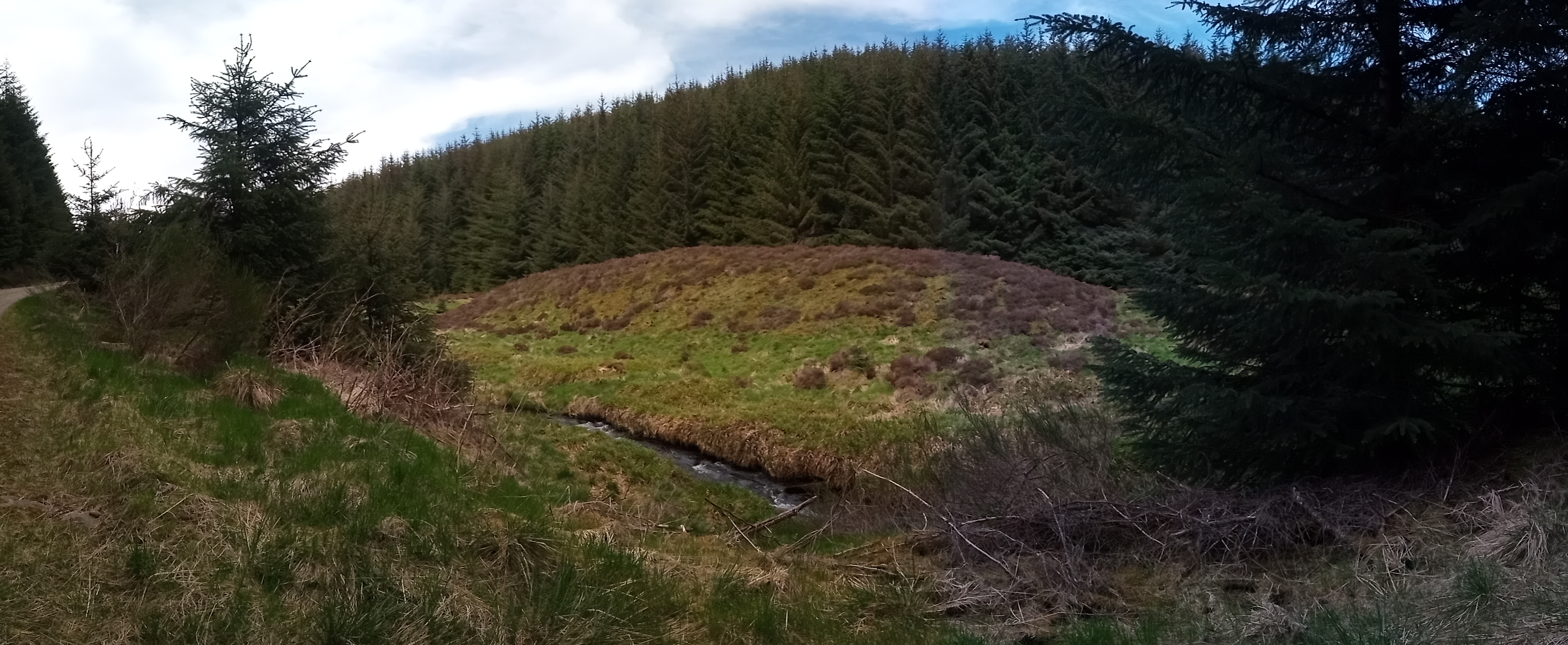
A side view panoramic photograph of the Wormy Hillock burial mound, showing the small river which runs next to it.

== See also ==
- Neolithic Europe
- Scheduled Monument
