= North Mains =

Archaeological site in Scotland

Coordinates: 56°19′38″N 3°44′12″W

North Mains is a henge in Strathearn on Strathallan Estate between Crieff and Auchterarder in Perthshire, Scotland (not in the valley known as Strathallan). It was excavated in 1979 and the final report was published in 1983.

== Description ==
Like most henges North Mains saw use over many centuries. Prior to the construction of the henge two pits were dug and a cremation burial was placed at the site. The henge ditch and one timber circle seem to have been contemporary to one another. There was a second timber circle. A series of burials was dug into and around the henge enclosure. An early Christian cemetery was later dug into the enclosed area.

== In literature ==
The Scottish poet Kathleen Jamie worked on the excavation of the site in 1979, and wrote about her experiences in her 2012 book Sightlines, in an essay entitled "The Woman in the Field".
