= Pit alignments =

Pit alignments are a type of prehistoric monument found throughout the British Isles, the function of which is at present poorly understood. They consist of a series of evenly spaced and often relatively shallow pits arranged in lines. These monuments are most frequently discovered through aerial photography, being morphologically well suited to identification by this method. Some alignments run for large distances, in straight or curving lines, and clearly represent massive undertakings by large numbers of people or by smaller numbers over long periods of time. Some examples appear to have been left open for some time rather than being immediately backfilled and do not appear to have held timber posts; they can sometimes be seen to interact with other pre-existing monuments. Such features would not have formed a significant impediment to travel even if the soil removed from them were used to create a bank running parallel and it seems likely that they would have been used more as markers. In some cases a bank has survived and these monuments are referred to as embanked pit alignments. They may also occur as a series of segments following the same line, and are then referred to as segmented pit alignments.

== Possible uses ==
Pit alignments occur in two forms, single alignments and double alignments. It has been suggested that single pit alignments date principally from the Iron Age and represent agricultural boundaries. They may represent a period of agricultural intensification and population growth in the later Iron Age. Double pit alignments are thought to date to the later Neolithic or Bronze Age and to be ritual in function, sometimes being found in relation to cursus monuments and henges. At Thornborough Henge a double alignment of pits, possibly evidence of a timber processional avenue, extends from the southern henge. However, double and single alignments have been found together at a number of sites, some of which show alignments that switch between the two forms, so that the form cannot be taken as clear dating evidence.
