= Devil's Quoits =

Neolithic henge in Oxfordshire, England

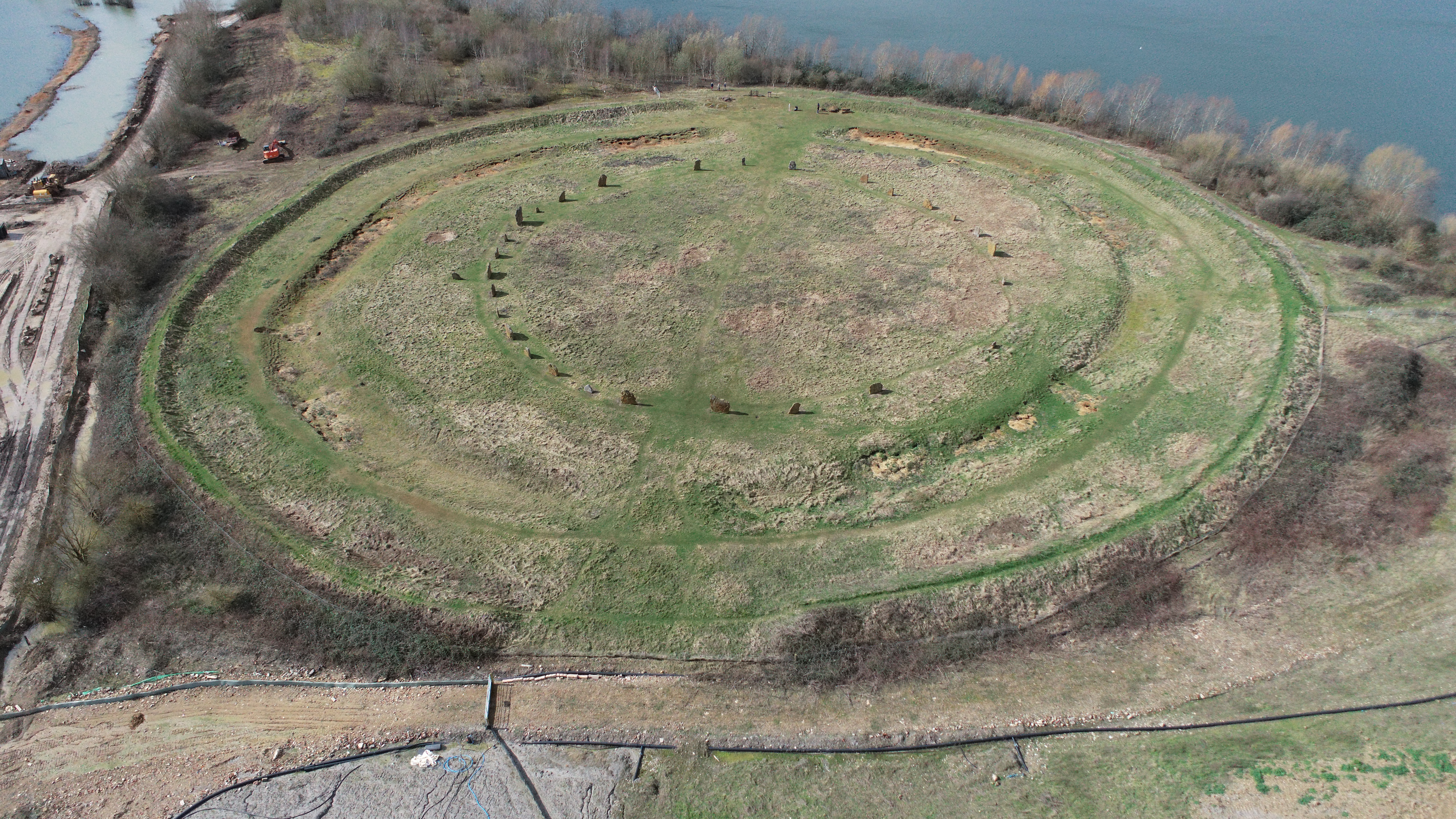
- Aerial view, 2022

- Location within Oxfordshire
- 51.7400°N 1.4059°W
- Type: Henge and Stone circle
- Periods: Neolithic / Bronze Age
- Location: Stanton Harcourt
- OS grid reference: SP41110471

The Devil's Quoits (grid reference SP411048) is a henge and stone circle to the south of the village of Stanton Harcourt in Oxfordshire, England. The site is believed to be from the Neolithic Period, between 4000 and 5000 years old, and is a Scheduled Ancient Monument. The Quoits were restored between 2002 and 2008, with new stones added, and the surrounding earthworks rebuilt.

== Name ==
The name "Devil's Quoits" is associated with a legend that states that the Devil once played quoits with a beggar for his soul and won by flinging the great stones. Tradition has it that the Devil and his opponent were sitting on the top of Wytham Hill, several miles away, when they played their game – presumably on or near the site of the Swinford Farm trig point which provides a commanding view across the Thames Valley.

== Description ==
The henge is a major class II circle henge monument of Late Neolithic date. The henge ditch enclosed a circular area up to 120 metres (390 ft) across, with opposed entrances facing almost due east and west. The northern half of the henge appears to have had a second enclosing ditch circuit.

Within the henge was a stone circle and a central stone setting which may have been put up after the henge had been in use for some time, in the Early Bronze Age. The stone circle had a slightly ovoid plan, with a maximum diameter of 79 metres (259 ft), and followed the same axis as the henge itself. It originally featured 36 stones, most of which were removed by the end of the Medieval period. The henge itself is at the centre of a complex of later prehistoric monuments including ring ditches and other possible mortuary enclosures.

The henge had survived as a slight earthwork until World War II, when it was levelled in advance of runway construction. There was only one stone standing in situ in 1940, while two others had been re-erected nearby. The site was seriously damaged by the construction of an airfield in 1940 which involved the construction of concrete runways and the levelling of a large area. The site has been further damaged by gravel extraction since then. Excavations carried out in advance of gravel extraction in 1972, 1973 and 1988 located a complete plan of the Devil's Quoits. Excavation of the ditch terminals indicated repeated use and deposition, with finds including hearths and animal and human bones.

== Restoration ==
The Devil's Quoits were restored between 2002 and 2008, with the original quoits A, B, and C re-erected along with other conglomerate stones found at the site. Twenty new replacement stones were placed in the original holes for a total of 28 stones, and the surrounding earthworks re-built.

The earthworks were restored to the approximate condition they had at the beginning of Roman times, when the ditch began to be filled with ploughsoil and the bank was eroding. This was to ensure the preservation of the remaining Neolithic and Bronze Age deposits in the ditch. Soil had to be imported onto the site in order to re-form the bank. It was built up to 2 metres (6.6 ft) high which is only around half its original height.

Several of the standing stones had been unearthed during the archaeological excavations, where they had been buried in the ditch or within stoneholes. Others had been encountered during topsoil stripping or during quarrying operations. These were all re-erected in what may have been their original positions taking into account the fact that the largest uprights appear to have been near the two entrances to the circle. Twenty spaces remained which were filled with modern conglomerate blocks sourced from a nearby quarry at Ducklington.

== Gallery ==
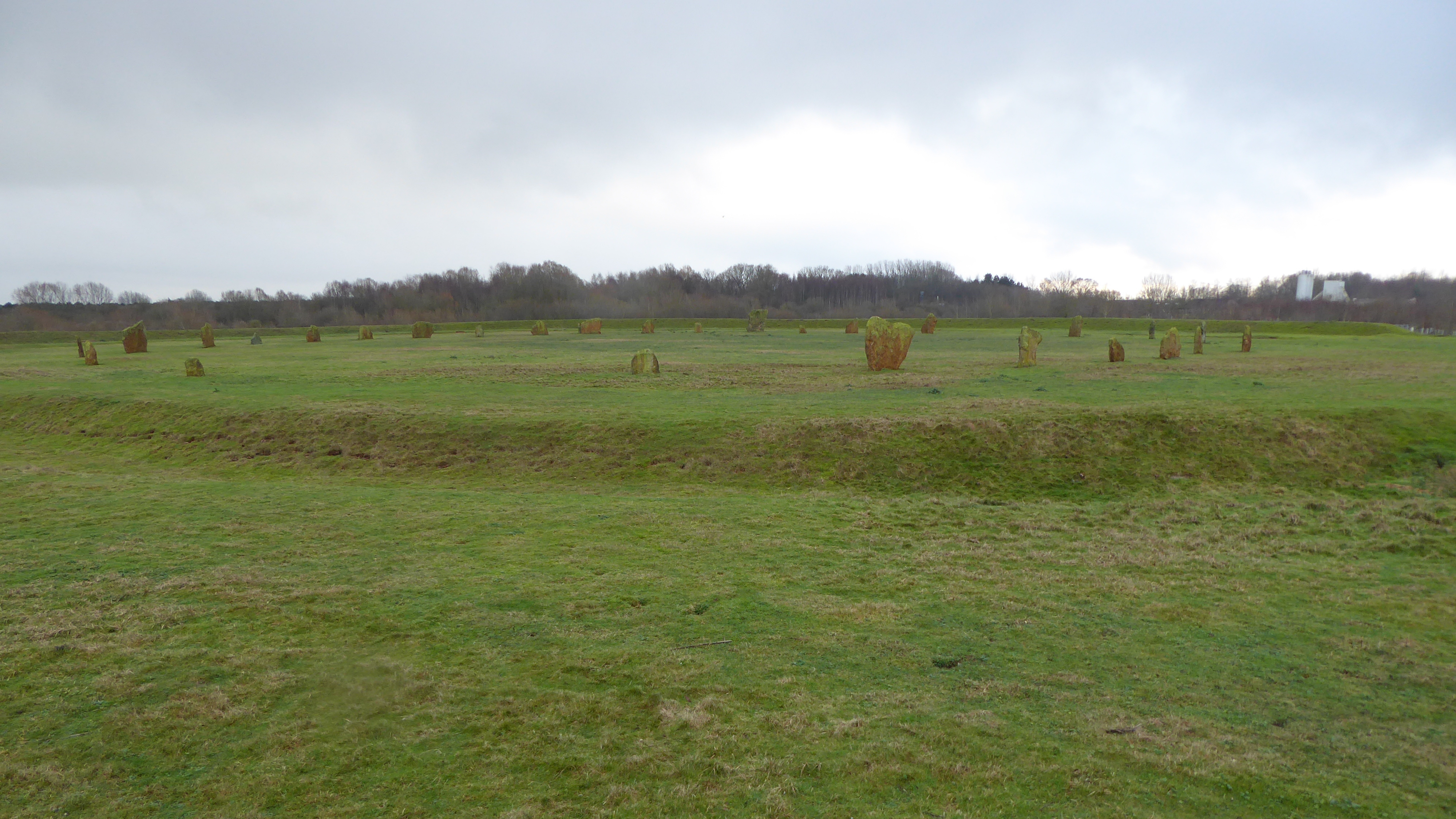
The Devil's Quoits ditch and stones after restoration, circa 2016

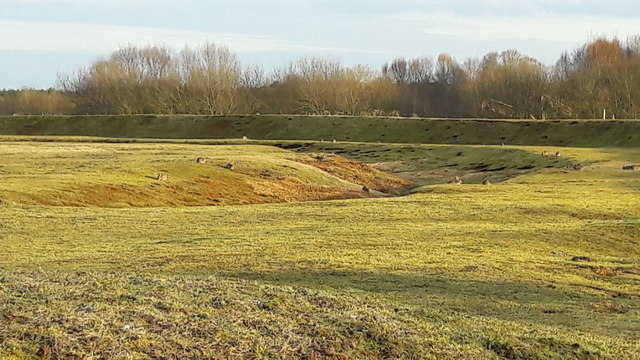
2017

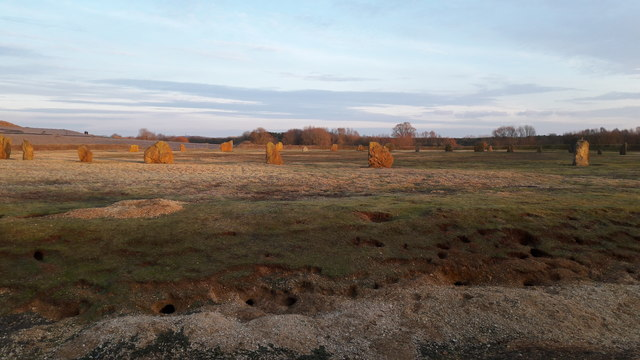
2017

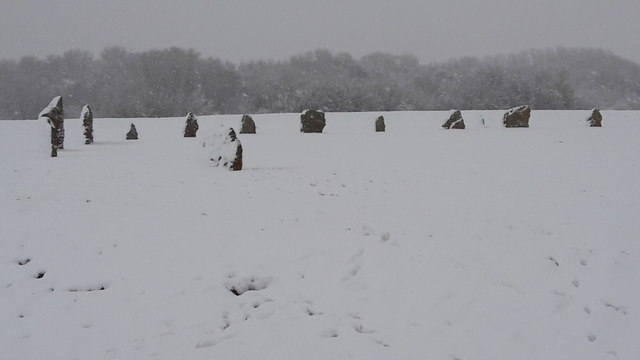
2017
