= Sark Henge =

Modern henge monument on Sark, Channel Islands

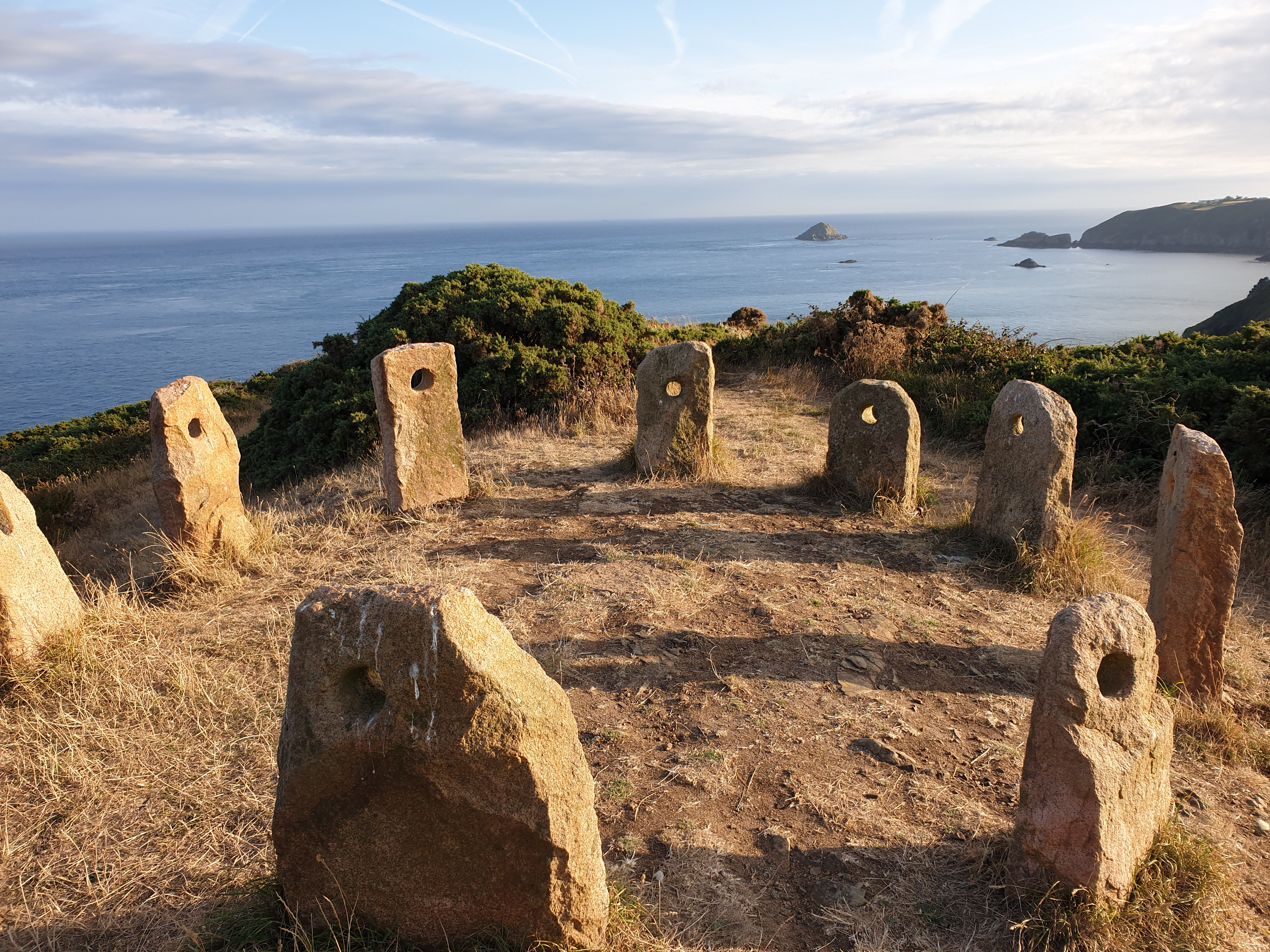
Sark Henge

Sark Henge is a modern henge monument on the island of Sark, in the Channel Islands. It was constructed in 2015.

== History ==
Sark Henge was built in 2015, to commemorate the 450 year anniversary of Queen Elizabeth granting the fief of Sark to Hellier de Carteret in 1565. It is located near Point Derrible.

== Design ==
Nine one-eyed giant stones of Jersey granite form a ring around a stone disc. The stone disc symbolises the Seigneur of Sark greeting and thanking their settler ancestors; nine is the number of territories in which de Carteret's 40 tenements were sited, and the circle divides by 40, giving 9 degrees to each of the 40 men gathered about their lord. The solstice line SE / NW marks winter sunrise / summer sunset. The henge stones were previously gateposts around the island. The henge monument was designed by historian Richard Axton.
