= Listed buildings in Cockermouth =

Cockermouth is a civil parish and a town in the Cumberland unitary authority area of Cumbria, England. It contains 105 listed buildings that are recorded in the National Heritage List for England. Of these, six are listed at Grade I, the highest of the three grades, seven are at Grade II*, the middle grade, and the others are at Grade II, the lowest grade. Cockermouth is a market town at the confluence of the Rivers Derwent and Cocker, and bridges crossing these rivers are listed. The oldest surviving building is Cockermouth Castle, parts of which are in ruins, and parts are inhabited; these are all listed. Historically the town's industries have been milling and brewing. Former mills that have been adapted for other uses, and part of a brewery are listed. Most of the other listed buildings are houses, cottages and associated structures. A variety of other buildings are listed, including schools, churches, hotels, public houses, a former hospice, a milestone, a former court house, a former bank, a statue, and the town hall.

== Key ==
Grade	Criteria
I	Buildings of exceptional interest, sometimes considered to be internationally important
II*	Particularly important buildings of more than special interest
II	Buildings of national importance and special interest

== Buildings ==
Name and location	Photograph	Date	Notes	Grade
Cockermouth Castle (uninhabited parts); 54.66527°N 3.36264°W		c. 1220	The castle stands on an elevated site overlooking the confluence of the River Derwent and the River Cocker, and much of it is in ruins. The uninhabited parts include the Hall of 1360, the Flag Tower of 1387, and the gatehouse that was rebuilt in about 1400. There are also full curtain walls and two wards. The castle and site on which it stands is a Scheduled Monument.	I
Outer gatehouse, Cockermouth Castle; 54.66535°N 3.36171°W	—	14th century	The gatehouse is at the northeast corner of the castle. It is in stone with a tunnel vault. The inner doorway has a chamfered round arch, and above it are five coats of arms and a hood mould. Within the gatehouse is a spiral staircase. The upper rooms communicate with the occupied parts of the castle.	I
38, 40 and 42 Market Place (Percy House); 54.66411°N 3.36185°W	—	1462–63	Originally a house, later altered and converted for other uses. It is in rendered stone with a Welsh slate roof, and has two storeys. There are three bays and a rear extension, resulting in an L-shaped plan. The ground floor contains 19th-century shop fronts with pilasters and cornices, doorways, and an entry, and in the upper floor are sash windows. Inside the building many early features have been retained.	II*
Bowling Green House; 54.66551°N 3.35988°W	—	1682–83	A summer house in the grounds of Cockermouth Castle, it is in brick with stone quoins and dressings, and a conical slate roof. The building has an octagonal plan on a square base, and has a moulded cornice. The doorway is approached up a flight of steps, and it has a curved open pediment with an urn. The flanking windows have stone architraves.	II
Wordsworth House, garden walls and gate piers 54.66361°N 3.36806°W		1690	The house was altered and expanded in 1745, and was the birthplace of William Wordsworth in 1770. It is in stone with quoins, and has two storeys with a basement, and a symmetrical front of nine bays. Steps lead up to a central porch that has two Doric columns on pedestals, and a moulded entablature. The windows are sashes with moulded surrounds. The front garden is surrounded by a stone wall, and the two gate piers are surmounted by moulded caps and ornaments.	I
26–34 St Helen's Street; 54.66397°N 3.35864°W	—	Early 18th century	A row of houses, some roughcast, some stuccoed, most with slate roofs, and all in two storeys. Some of the doorways have fanlights, some have moulded surrounds, and all have sash windows. No. 34 has two moulded doorways, rusticated quoins, architraves to the windows, and a pantile roof.	II
Cottage and stable, Goatmill House; 54.66679°N 3.37205°W	—	Early 18th century (probable)	Originally a farmhouse, with a former barn or stable at the left end. It is in roughcast stone with a slate roof, and has two storeys. There are two modern windows on each floor.	II
Norham House; 54.66342°N 3.36687°W	—	1725	The house is rendered and has quoins and a slate roof. It has a symmetrical front with two storeys and five bays. Steps lead up to the central doorway, which has a moulded surround and a glazed fanlight. The windows are sashes, all with moulded surrounds.	II*
72 and 74 Kirkgate; 54.66184°N 3.35929°W	—	1729	A pair of houses, stuccoed or roughcast, with a pantile roof, and in two low storeys. They have doorways with plain surrounds, and sash windows. No. 72 has three bays and a dated lintel, and No. 74 has two bays.	II
13 Kirkgate and forecourt 54.66351°N 3.35952°W	—	1731	A roughcast house with a slate roof, in two storeys. Above the door is a dated lintel. The windows are sashes, those in the upper floor being horizontally-sliding sashes. In front of the house is a small cobbled forecourt.	II
Congregational Sunday School; 54.66418°N 3.36703°W	—	1731	Originally a chapel, it is in roughcast stone with quoins. The south face is gabled and contains two round windows on the ground floor, and three sash windows above. To the right is a re-set lean-to porch with unfluted Tuscan half-columns and a frieze dated 1719.	II
Castlegate House; 54.66497°N 3.36054°W	—	1739	A detached stuccoed house with a modillioned cornice and a slate roof. There are two storeys and a symmetrical front of three bays, and the lower storey is rusticated. The central doorway has Doric pilasters with blocked entablatures, and a pedimented modillioned cornice. Above the door is a semicircular fanlight with curved interlaced tracery, and the windows are sashes.	II*
1 and 3 Castlegate; 54.66438°N 3.36144°W	—	18th century	A pair of stuccoed shops with pantile roofs in three storeys. No. 1 has three bays, and No. 3 has two. There are shop fronts in both buildings, that of No. 3 having round-arched glazing bars and a cornice with Greek Key decoration. No. 1 also has a doorway with a moulded surround and a cornice on scroll brackets. In the upper floors are sash windows, those in the middle floor having moulded architraves.	II
2 and 4 Castlegate; 54.66444°N 3.36115°W	—	18th century	A pair of houses in late Georgian style with three storeys. They are stuccoed, with pilaster strips, eaves cornices, and string courses at the level of the sills. The doorways have moulded architraves and fanlights, and the sash windows have plain architraves.	II
5 and 7 Castlegate; 54.66447°N 3.36137°W	—	Mid 18th century	Originally one house, later divided into two, it is rendered and has a slate roof. There are three storeys and seven bays. In the first two bays of the ground floor are bow windows, with a doorway between, and to the right is an entry. The windows are sashes.	II*
41 and 43 Kirkgate and forecourt 54.66281°N 3.35898°W	—	18th century	A pair of stuccoed houses with projecting stone quoins, and with two storeys. The doorways have moulded architraves, and the windows are sashes in plain surrounds. At the level of the upper sills is a string course. In front of the houses is a cobbled forecourt.	II
46–50 Kirkgate; 54.66244°N 3.35938°W	—	18th century	A row of three differing houses, all roughcast and with two storeys. No. 46, on the right, has three bays, sash windows, and a doorway with a cornice on brackets. No. 48 has one bay, a doorway with a chamfered surround, a shallow bow window in the ground floor, and a sash window above. No, 50 has two bays, a doorway with pilasters and an open pediment, shallow bow windows in the ground floor, and sashes above.	II
47A, 49 and 51 Kirkgate and forecourt 54.66251°N 3.35895°W	—	18th century	Three stuccoed houses with quoins and a slate roof, in two storeys with cellars. There are three doorcases with moulded architraves, and three sash windows in each floor, all in moulded surrounds. In front of the houses is a cobbled forecourt.	II
53 and 55 Kirkgate and forecourt 54.66238°N 3.35892°W	—	18th century	A pair of differing houses, both rendered, with slate roofs, and in two storeys. No. 53 is lower, and has a square entry, a panelled door, and sash windows in architraves, one in the ground floor and three above. No. 55 is later and has four steps leading up to a central doorway with a timber porch, two sash windows in the ground floor and three above. In front of the houses is a cobbled forecourt.	II
24–28 Main Street; 54.66387°N 3.36382°W	—	18th century	A rendered building with a slate roof, in two low storeys and five bays. In the centre is a round-headed doorway with an architrave, imposts, and a traceried fanlight. This is flanked by shop fronts, and in the upper floor are sash windows with moulded frames.	II
16–22 Main Street; 54.66387°N 3.36351°W	—	18th century	A row of four stuccoed stone shops with quoins, in three storeys. In the ground floor are shop fronts, and above are sash windows. The windows in Nos. 16 and 18 have moulded architraves; those in the middle floor of Nos. 20 and 22 have moulded surrounds and cornices on consoles. In the ground floor of No. 22 are three round arches with keystones, imposts, and a cornice, and to the left is a three-storey warehouse with a door and a window on each floor.	II
45 and 47 Main Street; 54.66349°N 3.36546°W	—	18th century	Originally a pair of small cottages, later converted into shops, they are pebbledashed with a slate roof. They have two storeys, and contain on the ground floor two shop fronts and a sash window, and above three sash windows.	II
30 and 30A Market Place; 54.66429°N 3.36154°W	—	18th century	A shop with a rendered front, quoins to the right, and a slate roof. There are three storeys and five bays. In the ground floor is a shop front with four Ionic pilasters, a doorway, a modern window, and an entry. The windows in the upper floors are sashes with moulded surrounds.	II
Gate piers, All Saints Church; 54.66320°N 3.35961°W	—	18th century	The two gate piers are at the entrance to the churchyard. They are in rusticated ashlar, and have moulded plinths and caps.	II
Garden walls, Cockermouth Castle; 54.66514°N 3.36069°W	—	18th century (probable)	The walls are mainly in brick. They separate the castle grounds from the street, and enclose the former bowling green,	II
Double Mills; 54.65614°N 3.36743°W		18th century (probable)	Originally a corn mill, later used as a youth hostel. It is in stone, partly in ashlar and partly in rubble. There are three storeys and two rectangular windows on each floor. Remnants of two iron wheels have survived.	II
Barn, Goatmill House; 54.66685°N 3.37192°W	—	18th century (probable)	The barn is in stone rubble and is partly rendered. It contains a blocked segmental-headed opening, a garage door, and ventilation slits.	II
Cornmill at Goatmill Bridge; 54.66700°N 3.37197°W		Mid 18th century	The former corn mill is in roughcast on stone with a hipped slate roof. It has a rectangular plan and is in three storeys. The windows and doors are all modern replacements. In the middle of the right return, in the top floor, is a gabled corrugated iron cabin above a doorway in the middle floor.	II
The Trout Hotel; 54.66340°N 3.36873°W		Mid 18th century	The hotel is a long, low roughcast building with quoins, a moulded cornice, and a slate roof. It has two storeys and ten bays. On the front is a projecting porch with two Ionic columns and a moulded entablature. The windows are sashes with moulded surrounds. Along the front and over the entrance are early 19th-century iron railings.	II
Kirkgate Corner; 54.66389°N 3.35971°W	—	1755	A former shop on a corner site with quoins. It has a three-storey gabled front to St Helen's Street. In the ground floor are a shop front and a doorway; above there are sash windows. In the middle floor is a heart-shaped datestone. On the Kirkgate front are a doorway approached by steps, sash windows, a cellar door and a cellar window.	II
Derwent Bridge House; 54.66421°N 3.37185°W	—	Mid to late 18th century	A rendered house with stone quoins in two storeys. The house is in two blocks, the left block being recessed. The doorway is modern, and the windows are sashes.	II
6 Castlegate; 54.66454°N 3.36105°W	—	Late 18th century	A stuccoed house with quoins and a moulded cornice on brackets. It has three storeys and three bays, and the windows are sashes with moulded and shouldered architraves. In the left bay is a doorway with four three-quarter Doric columns on pedestals, a moulded entablature, and a pedimented cornice.	II*
8 Castlegate; 54.66463°N 3.36100°W	—	Late 18th century	A stuccoed house with quoins and a slate roof. It has two storeys and a symmetrical three-bay front. Steps lead up to the central doorway which has a plain stone architrave, and the windows are sashes.	II
9 Castlegate; 54.66458°N 3.36125°W	—	Late 18th century	A rendered house with a slate roof, in three storeys and three bays. The doorway in the right bay has a moulded cornice, and the windows are sashes.	II
2 Crown Street; 54.66348°N 3.36834°W	—	Late 18th century	A roughcast house with quoins and eaves on brackets. It has two storeys and three bays. The central doorway has a plain architrave, a fanlight and a hood mould. The windows are sashes, also with plain architraves.	II
17–25 Kirkgate; 54.66325°N 3.35942°W	—	Late 18th century	A row of five differing houses stepped up a hill, each with two storeys. They are either stuccoed, rendered, or pebbledashed, and have slate roofs. The windows are sashes, and No. 25 has projecting quoins.	II
33 and 35 Kirkgate and forecourt 54.66307°N 3.35902°W	—	Late 18th century	A pair of stuccoed houses with quoins and a slate roof. The doorways have quoined surrounds, and the windows are sashes with architraves - there are three in the ground floor and five above. In front of the houses is a cobbled forecourt.	II
37 and 39 Kirkgate and forecourt 54.66294°N 3.35900°W	—	Late 18th century	A pair of stuccoed houses with a string course, a moulded eaves cornice on brackets, and a slate roof, in two storeys. The doorway to No. 39 has a moulded architrave and a trefoil pediment. The windows are sashes, those in the ground floor with triangular pediments, and those above with segmental pediments. In front of the houses is a cobbled forecourt.	II
45 and 47 Kirkgate and forecourt 54.66264°N 3.35897°W		Late 18th century	A pair of different rendered houses, each with a moulded eaves cornice and slate roofs, sash windows in moulded surrounds, and in two storeys. No. 45, to the left, has four bays. In the first bay is a carriage entrance with voussoirs, and in the third bay is a doorway with a moulded architrave. No. 47 has three bays, projecting quoins, a central round-arched doorway with a fanlight, Tuscan pilasters, and an open pediment. In front of the houses is a cobbled forecourt.	II*
68 and 70 Kirkgate; 54.66195°N 3.35930°W	—	Late 18th century	A pair of roughcast houses with pilaster strips and slate roofs, in two storeys. There are three round-headed doorways with fanlights containing Gothic tracery; there is one in No. 68, and two in No. 70, the right doorway leading to the rear. No. 68 has two sash windows in each floor; No. 70 has a 19th-century shop window in the ground floor and two modern windows above.	II
73–85A Main Street; 54.66339°N 3.36733°W	—	Late 18th century	A row of cottages, including a former public house, rendered or pebbledashed, with slate roofs. They all have two storeys, and most have panelled doors and sash windows.	II
4 and 6 Market Place; 54.66410°N 3.36002°W	—	Late 18th century	A pair of stuccoed stone shops with quoins and slate roofs. They have three storeys and six bays. Between the shops is a doorway with a cornice and a pediment, and this is flanked by 19th-century shop fronts. The windows are sashes with moulded surrounds.	II
Globe Hotel; 54.66362°N 3.36382°W		Late 18th century	The hotel, which has early Georgian features, was altered in the 19th century. It is roughcast with quoins and an eaves cornice, and has three storeys and seven bays. The doorway has a complex surround, including columns and a round arched head. The windows are sashes, those in the left bay being lower than in the other bays.	II
Swan Inn and 58–64 Kirkgate; 54.66213°N 3.35931°W		Late 18th century	A public house and four houses, forming a row. They are all roughcast with slate roofs, and have sash windows. Nos. 58 and 60 have round-headed doorways, the other doorways have flat heads.	II
Victorian Hall; 54.66397°N 3.36453°W	—	1797	Built as a Methodist chapel, and later used for other purposes, it is in stone, with quoins and a slate roof. The building has a rectangular plan, and two round-headed windows, the other windows being plain. Entry is through a cottage.	II
Southern range, Cockermouth Castle; 54.66494°N 3.36215°W	—	C. 1800	The range of stone buildings originated as stables and coach houses. They are in Gothick style, and have eight bays. The central two bays have three storeys and form a square tower containing a coach entrance, a clock and coachmen's rooms. The flanking bays have two storeys and have windows with pointed heads. To the right is a cottage, also with pointed-arched windows.	I
Goatmill House; 54.66669°N 3.37198°W	—	1802	Originally the miller's house, it is rendered and has a slate roof. It has two storeys and three bays. The doorway has pilasters, capitals and a cornice that are moulded, and a pediment containing a dated and inscribed plaque. The windows are sashes.	II
Cockermouth Castle (inhabited part); 54.66538°N 3.36218°W	—	1805	Known as the Wyndham Rooms, they are on the north side of the outer ward of the castle, and are in late Georgian style. Originally two cottages, they were later combined into one house. The residence is in stone with a slate roof. There are two storeys and eight bays, with three doorways on the ground floor. The windows are sashes with stone architraves.	I
St Leonard's Hospice; 54.66714°N 3.37314°W	—	1820	Originally a flax-drying house, it is a stone building with a slate roof and in a rectangular plan with two storeys. The windows have pointed arches, with two tiers of four windows along the sides, and in the south gable end there are two windows in both storeys and one in the gable. The north gable end contains a door in the ground floor, and external steps leading to a door in the upper floor.	II
Derwent Bridge; 54.66372°N 3.37133°W		1822	The bridge carries Gote Road (A5086 road) over the River Derwent. It is in stone, and consists of two segmental arches with triangular cutwaters. The bridge has a string course and parapet, and carries two lines of traffic and two footpaths.	II
1–4 The Croft; 54.66273°N 3.36178°W	—	Early 19th century	A row of four houses, originally for the workers at Rubbybanks Mill. They are in stone, with two storeys, and contain small sash windows.	II
10 Castlegate; 54.66469°N 3.36096°W	—	Early 19th century	A stuccoed house with quoins and a slate roof. It has two storeys and a symmetrical three-bay front. Steps flanked by wrought iron railings lead up to the central doorway, and the windows are sashes.	II
11 and 13 Castlegate; 54.66465°N 3.36122°W	—	Early 19th century	A pair of rendered houses with a slate roof, in three storeys and with three bays. The doorways have Doric pilasters and moulded cornices. Above the doors are simple fanlights, and the windows are sashes with plain surrounds.	II
5–9 Gote Road; 54.66486°N 3.37189°W	—	Early 19th century	A row of three houses in two storeys, with the ground floor in ashlar and the upper storey roughcast. Each house has two bays, and there are quoins on the corners of the upper floor. The doorways have fanlights, those of Nos. 5 and 9 being traceried, and the windows are sashes with moulded surrounds.	II
21–27 Gote Road; 54.66531°N 3.37213°W	—	Early 19th century	A terrace of four rendered houses with slate roofs. They have two storeys and each house has two bays. The doorways and windows have plain architraves, and the windows are sashes. In the left return of No. 21 is a stair window with an ogee head and a Gothic hood mould.	II
38 Kirkgate; 54.66271°N 3.35938°W	—	Early 19th century	Originally a shop and a house, later combined into one dwelling, it is stuccoed with a slate roof. There are two storeys, and the corner is canted, containing a doorway. The windows are sashes in architraves. In the upper floor of the left return is a warehouse door, above which is a pulley under a gable. At the rear is an iron lamp holder.	II
78–86 Kirkgate; 54.66170°N 3.35931°W	—	Early 19th century	A terrace of five roughcast cottages in two storeys. Some have slate roofs and others have pantiles. All the windows are sashes. Some of the cottages have one bay, and others have two. Each cottage has a doorway with a cornice carried on brackets.	II
12 and 14 Main Street; 54.66389°N 3.36315°W	—	Early 19th century	A pair of shops, stuccoed, with quoins and slate roofs. They have three storeys and each shop has three bays. In the ground floor are 19th-century shop fronts, with an entry between. Above are three sash windows in each floor in each shop. In the middle floor, between the shops, is a sundial.	II
52–56 Main Street; 54.66382°N 3.36514°W	—	Early 19th century	A row of three stuccoed stone shop in two storeys. In the ground floor are three modern shop fronts, and in the upper floor are seven sash windows in plain stone architraves.	II
1 Market Place; 54.66392°N 3.35990°W	—	Early 19th century	A stuccoed building on a corner site in three storeys. Its doorway and windows, which are sashes, have moulded surrounds. There are two paired windows in the ground floor, and four separate windows in each of the upper floors.	II
3–7 Market Place; 54.66394°N 3.36013°W	—	Early 19th century	A row of three stuccoed stone shops with quoins, in three storeys. Nos. 3 and 7 have two bays, and No. 5 has three. Each building has a small shop front, and the doorways of Nos. 3 and 7 have pediments. No. 5 has a doorway with a hood mould, and a smaller entry door. In the upper floors are sash windows.	II
9 Market Place; 54.66394°N 3.36043°W	—	Early 19th century	A house in two storeys and three bays. It has a symmetrical front that has a central doorway with a hood mould, and sash windows, two of which are on the ground floor and three above.	II
33 and 35 Market Place; 54.66400°N 3.36154°W	—	Early 19th century	A pair of stone shops with a moulded cornice and pilaster strips. They have three storeys and four bays. The central doorway has Greek Doric half-columns with a frieze, a cornice, and a fanlight. This is flanked by Victorian shop fronts, and in the upper floors are sash windows.	II
44 Market Place; 54.66410°N 3.36200°W	—	Early 19th century	A house and shop in rendered stone, with a Welsh slate roof and red ridge tiles. It has two storeys and two bays. In the ground floor is a 19th-century shop front with pilasters and a moulded cornice; to the right of it is a doorway to the house. The windows in the upper floor are sashes with revealed surrounds.	II
46 Market Place; 54.66402°N 3.36204°W	—	Early 19th century	A house and shop in rendered stone, with three storeys, two bays, and a moulded cornice. In the ground floor is a shop front with pilasters and a moulded cornice; to the right of it is a doorway to the house. The windows in the upper floor are sashes with raised stone surrounds.	II
10 and 12 St Helen's Street; 54.66402°N 3.35912°W	—	Early 19th century	A pair of roughcast houses with pilaster strips, and a slate roof. They have two storeys and a total of three bays. In the centre are two round-arched doorways with architraves, keystones, and imposts. The doorway of No. 12 has a fanlight with Gothic tracery. The windows are sashes in plain architraves.	II
24–28 South Street; 54.66260°N 3.36631°W	—	Early 19th century	Originally built as a school, later converted into a row of three houses, they are roughcast with a slate roof, and have three storeys. Each house has one bay, with one sash window in a plain stone architrave on each floor. To the right is a doorway, that of No. 28 having a traceried fanlight. In front of the houses is a cobbled forecourt.	II
Kirkby House; 54.66345°N 3.36855°W	—	Early 19th century	A stuccoed house on a plinth with a string course and a slate roof. It has two storeys and four bays, and all the windows are sashes in plain surrounds. The doorway in the third bay is approached up three steps, and has a plain frame and a traceried fanlight.	II
Kirkgate House; 54.66259°N 3.35969°W	—	Early 19th century	A roughcast house with a slate roof, in two storeys and three bays. It has pilaster strips, sash windows, and a central doorway with a plain surround and a fanlight.	II
Milestone; 54.66460°N 3.38755°W	—	Early 19th century	The milestone was provided for the Cockermouth to Workington Turnpike road. It has a rounded top and is inscribed on the front with the distances in miles to Cockermouth and to Workington.	II
Former National Westminster Bank; 54.66385°N 3.36467°W	—	Early 19th century	Originally a bank, later used for other purposes, it is mainly in stuccoed stone, with quoins and a cornice, and has three storeys and three bays. The ground floor is in stone and has a central entrance flanked by shop windows. In the upper floors are sash windows with moulded surrounds. The windows in the middle floor have wings and keystones, and those in the top floor have sills and consoles under the cornice. There is a wing on the right side at the rear that has a warehouse door with a gable in the top floor.	II
Rubbybanks Mill; 54.66294°N 3.36186°W	—	Early 19th century	Originally a woollen mill, later converted into housing, it is in pebbledashed stone with a slate roof. It has three storeys and seven bays. The doors and windows are modern, and on the front facing the river are balconies.	II
Wordsworth Hotel; 54.66349°N 3.36514°W		Early 19th century	The hotel is pebbledashed with quoins and a slate roof. It has three storeys and four bays. There is a carriage entrance in the first bay and a doorway in the third bay. The windows are sashes.	II
Cocker Bridge; 54.66388°N 3.36219°W		1828	The bridge carries Main Street over the River Cocker, and consists of a single segmental arch. The parapet has five tall octagonal piers and iron railings.	II
Old Court House; 54.66392°N 3.36244°W		1828	The former court house is in ashlar, and in Tudor Revival style. It has two storeys with a basement, and a front of three bays, with a modillioned cornice. A flight of steps leads up to a central entrance; the entrance and both ground floor windows have Tudor arched heads. The three windows in the upper floor are rectangular with hood moulds. In front of the basement area, and flanking the steps, are iron railings and gates. On the right return, facing the river, are two long windows, and behind the front block is a higher three-storey wing.	II
South Lodge; 54.65700°N 3.36028°W	—	1831	A stone house with a hipped slate roof, it has a square plan, with two storeys and five bays. The house has a porch with four unfluted Doric columns, a high frieze, a cornice, and side windows. Above the door is a fanlight, and the windows are sashes. At the rear is an earlier, lower wing.	II
Derwent Mill; 54.66562°N 3.36808°W		1834	The steam-powered mill was extended in 1847 and again in 1855. It closed in the 1990s and has been converted into flats and offices. The mill is in stone rubble, with a green slate roof and lead hips and ridge. There are four storeys and 20 bays. Two bays project forward as a staircase wing, and at the top is an ashlar attic. At the angles are channel-jointed pilasters with crude moulded capitals.	II
The Fitz; 54.66191°N 3.37964°W	—	1835	A country house in Neoclassical style, with two storeys and nine bays. It is in calciferous sandstone, on a squared plinth and has a green slate roof. On the front are an eaves cornice, a string course, and angle pilasters. The porch has four fluted Doric columns and side lights, and above the double panelled doors is a fanlight. The windows are sashes in architraves.	II
Town Hall; 54.66321°N 3.36118°W		1841	Originally a Methodist chapel, it was converted into the town hall in 1934. The building is stuccoed, and has a symmetrical front of three bays and two storeys. On the front are full-height pilasters, a dentilled cornice, and a parapet. In the centre is a porch with two fluted Greek Doric columns and an entablature. The windows are round-headed; there are two in the lower floor and three above.	II
Grecian Villa; 54.66299°N 3.36860°W		c. 1844	A house, later used as a fire office and then as a hotel, in Greek Revival style. It is in sandstone on a plinth, with a cornice band, a moulded top cornice, and Tuscan pilasters. There are two storeys, the house has a square plan, and in the centre is a recessed loggia on both floors. In both floors are two Ionic columns, and in the upper floor is a balustraded balcony. The windows are sashes.	II
Hames Hall; 54.66922°N 3.37153°W	—	c. 1844	A country house by Francis Goodwin in Tudor Gothic style. It is in ashlar, with two storeys and three bays. In the centre is a porch that has a Tudor arch with a hood mould, carved headstops, and an embattled gable. The central bay is flanked by octagonal turrets, and above the porch is an oriel window. The outer bays each contains an embattled Gothic bay window. Between the storeys is a moulded string course. Adjacent to the house is a cobbled courtyard, roughcast two-storey buildings, including a coach house with a clock, and a wall ending in a round turret.	II
Eastern range, Cockermouth Castle; 54.66518°N 3.36173°W	—	1847	The range contains offices and was extended in 1894. It is in stone and has two storeys, and it contains sash windows and a Victorian Gothic doorway. The windows have pointed heads, and three of them have hood moulds. There are also two rectangular bay windows with gabled tops.	I
Bush Hotel; 54.66346°N 3.36570°W		19th century	The hotel is in rendered stone, with end pilasters, a string course at the level of the first floor sills, a cornice on modillions, and a slate roof. It has three storeys and four bays, and in the right bay is a carriage entrance. The doorway has a moulded surround and a tri-lobed pediment. The windows are sashes, and all but those in the top floor have moulded architraves with keystones and wings.	II
United Reformed Church; 54.66397°N 3.36694°W		1850	The church was designed by C. W. Eaglesfield in Perpendicular style. It is in limestone, and has a symmetrical front of three gabled bays. Between the bays are buttresses rising to form turrets. On the top of each gable, and on the tops of the outer buttresses, are pinnacles. The central bay contains a three-light Perpendicular window, and the outer bays each has a doorway with a pointed arch, over which is a two-light window.	II
All Saints Church; 54.66318°N 3.36008°W		1852–54	The church, designed by Joseph Clarke in Decorated style, is in rubble stone with freestone dressings and slate roofs. It has a cruciform plan, and consists of a nave, aisles, north and south porches, transepts with east aisles containing a north vestry and a south chapel, a steeple at the crossing, and a long chancel. The tower has two stages above the nave, with buttresses rising to gabled tops and corner pinnacles. It has a plain parapet and a recessed spire with clock faces.	II*
Cemetery chapels 54.65878°N 3.35421°W		1856	A pair of chapels by C. W. Eaglesfield in stone with slate roofs. The chapels are identical and have a longitudinal plan. Between them is an arch surmounted by a hexagonal tower with a belfry and a spire with a finial.	II
Christ Church; 54.66240°N 3.36763°W		1865	The church, designed by W. Bruce in simple Gothic style, is in stone with slate roofs. It consists of a nave with a narrower vestibule at the west end, a northwest tower, a southwest porch, and a short chancel with a north vestry. The tower has three stages, and has angle buttresses, a plain parapet, and plain pyramidal pinnacles. Inside the church are galleries on three sides.	II
1–8 Fern Bank; 54.66003°N 3.36687°W	—	late 19th century	A symmetrical terrace of eight houses in two storeys with attics, each house having two bays. All the houses have a canted bay window in the ground floor, a double sash window with colonnets above, and a moulded cornice on ornamental brackets. The central six houses have a doorway with a fanlight and a cornice on brackets, a single sash window above, and a gabled dormer in the roof. The end houses have a gable facing the road containing a round-headed window, and the doorway is in a recessed outer bay. All the gables have bargeboards.	II
Mayo Statue; 54.66363°N 3.36553°W		1875	The statue of Richard Bourke, 6th Earl of Mayo, Member of Parliament for Cockermouth 1857–68, stands in the centre of Main Street. It has a square granite plinth with a cornice. On the plinth is a standing figure in white marble.	II
Grammar School; 54.65673°N 3.35078°W		1881	This opened as the Cumberland Industrial School, it later became a grammar school which closed in 1990, and the building was then converted into offices and workshops. It is in red brick with blue brick details and sandstone dressings, and it has a U-shaped courtyard plan. The entrance block has two storeys with a central round-headed doorway flanked by two-storey canted bay windows. At the sides and behind are ranges of one- and two-storey buildings.	II
Maltings, Castle Brewery; 54.66511°N 3.36346°W		1889	This consists of a malthouse and a barley kiln, that has since been converted into offices. It is in sandstone with quoins and a slate roof, and has an L-shaped plan. The main block has four storeys and attics. There is an east gabled face of four bays, and a south front of six bays, incorporating a roof hoist with a timber pitch roof. There is a stair tower, and a four-storey kiln tower with a pyramidal roof surmounted by a timber square ventilation tower.	II
11–19A Gote Road; 54.66500°N 3.37196°W	—	Undated	A terrace of five roughcast houses with a string course, pilasters, and a slate roof, in two storeys. Most of the windows are sashes, but some have been modernised. The rear wing of the house at the right (No. 19) has been converted into a separate cottage (No. 19A) which has a 20th-century gabled porch.	II
31 Kirkgate and forecourt 54.66316°N 3.35918°W	—	Undated	A stuccoed house with a slate roof, in two low storeys. There is one sash window in each floor, and a doorway, all with plain stone architraves. In front of the house is a cobbled forecourt.	II
4 Main Street; 54.66389°N 3.36263°W	—	Undated	A shop and an office in stone, with a rusticated ground floor. It has string courses, a cornice, and a corbelled-out clock on the parapet. In the centre is a round-headed doorway with a traceried fanlight. To the left is a two-bay shop, with a shop front in the ground floor and sash windows above. The office to the right has three bays with a central porch that has two Ionic columns and a cornice, and is flanked by windows with two round-headed lights. Above are sash windows, those in the middle floor having moulded architraves with cornices.	II
9–21 Main Street; 54.66367°N 3.36319°W		Undated	A row of shops and a public house. No. 21 (Tye House) has three storeys, quoins, a cornice with modillions, a modern shop front, and sash windows. Adjoining this is the Black Bull public house, stuccoed with two storeys, a yard door, a pub door, a shop front, and sash windows. The other buildings all have two storeys, shop fronts and sash windows. No. 9 also has quoins.	II
29–35A Main Street; 54.66358°N 3.36418°W	—	Undated	A row of four stone shops, stuccoed, with quoins and slate roofs. They all have two storeys, and in the ground floor are shop fronts, most of which are modern. In the upper floor are eleven sash windows, most in moulded frames.	II
49 and 51 Main Street; 54.66347°N 3.36551°W	—	Undated	Two shops, possibly originally one house, stuccoed and with a slate roof. It has three storeys and five bays. In the centre is a round-headed entry, which is flanked by modern shop fronts. Above are sash windows, those in the middle floor having moulded stone architraves with cornices.	II
65–69 Main Street; 54.66346°N 3.36665°W	—	Undated	Originally two houses, later converted into three shops, they are partly rendered and partly pebbledashed, and have three storeys. No. 69 has string courses at sill level in both upper storeys. In the ground floor are 19th-century shop fronts, and above are sash windows, those in the middle floor having architraves.	II
70–82 Main Street; 54.66376°N 3.36627°W	—	Undated	A row of shops, mainly with two storeys, in whitewashed stone with slate roofs. There are shop fronts in the ground floor, and above the windows are sashes, most of them with moulded surrounds and wings. No. 82 is in stuccoed stone and has three storeys and a string course. The windows in the middle floor have moulded architraves.	II
11–23 Market Place; 54.66398°N 3.36069°W	—	Undated	A row of shops and a house, rendered, and in three storeys. Some of the shops have small Victorian shop fronts, and the shop fronts of Nos. 13 and 15 have a dentilled cornice. No. 13 also has an arched carriage entrance. The windows in the upper floors are sashes.	II
14–28 Market Place; 54.66412°N 3.36029°W	—	Undated	A row of stone shops and a public house, stuccoed or rendered, with quoins and slate roofs. They all have three storeys, and most of the shops have Victorian or Edwardian fronts in the ground floor. In the upper floors are sash windows, most with moulded surrounds. No. 14 has dentilled cornices, and No. 16 has a balustraded parapet.	II
1–35 St Helen's Street; 54.66398°N 3.36069°W		Undated	A row of properties of various types, in Georgian style. They are in stone, most have slate roofs, they are faced with various materials, and all have two storeys. Most of the windows are sashes.	II
Challoner House; 54.66224°N 3.36322°W	—	Undated	The building is roughcast with stone quoins and a slate roof. It has two storeys, three doorways with fanlights, and sash windows in architraves. To the left is an embattled courtyard wall containing a segmental-arched entrance to the courtyard, which has brick cobbles. To the left of the courtyard is a range of buildings including a stable, a coach house and a former coachman's cottage.	II
Pump, Cockermouth Castle; 54.66527°N 3.36184°W	—	Undated	The pump is inside the outer gatehouse of the castle. It consists of a square stone pier with chamfered corners and a curved cap. There is a curved iron handle and a wooden pipe. The pump drains into a square stone trough with a circular basin.	II
Huntsman Hotel, former Barclay's Bank, and Brown Cow Public House; 54.66353°N 3.36492°W		Undated	A row of three differing buildings, either rendered or roughcast, all with string courses, sash windows, and slate roofs. The Brown Cow public house, on the left, has two storeys and three bays. The former bank, in the middle, and the Huntsman Hotel both have three storeys, and the hotel also has a moulded doorway with a trefoil cornice.	II
