= Cockermouth =

Town in Cumbria, England

Coordinates: 54.6613°N 3.3620°W

- Town and parish
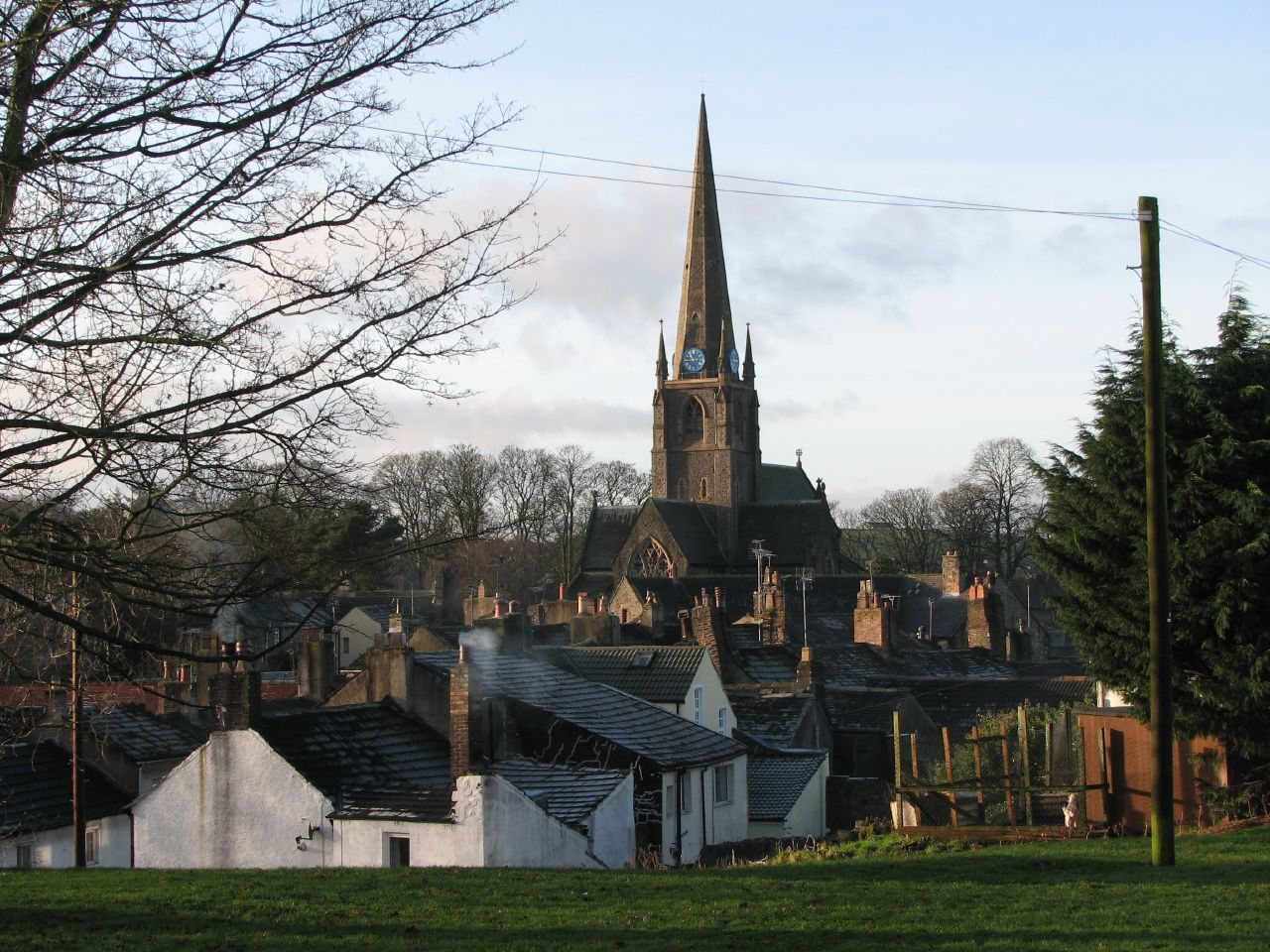
- All Saints Church

- Location within Cumbria
- Population: 8,847 (Parish, 2021); 8,860 (Built up area, 2021)
- OS grid reference: NY121304
  - London: 526 km
- Civil parish: Cockermouth
- Unitary authority: Cumberland
- Ceremonial county: Cumbria
- Region: North West
- Country: England
- Sovereign state: United Kingdom
- Post town: COCKERMOUTH
- Postcode district: CA13
- Dialling code: 01900
- Police: Cumbria
- Fire: Cumbria
- Ambulance: North West
- UK Parliament: Penrith & Solway

Cockermouth /ˈkɒkərmaʊθ, -əθ/ is a market town and civil parish in the Cumberland unitary authority area of Cumbria, England. The name refers to the town's position by the confluence of the River Cocker into the River Derwent. At the 2021 census, the built up area had a population of 8,860.

Cockermouth is situated a short distance outside the English Lake District on its north-west fringe. Much of the architectural core of the town remains unchanged since the basic medieval layout was filled in the 18th and 19th centuries. The regenerated market place is now a central historical focus within the town and reflects events from its 800-year history. The town is prone to flooding and experienced severe floods in 2005, 2009 and 2015.

Mary, Queen of Scots, came to Cockermouth in 1568, after her defeat at the Battle of Langside. She is said to have stayed at the house of Henry Fletcher (died 1574), who gave her a velvet gown and she later sent him a letter of thanks. Fletcher's son moved from Cockermouth to Moresby Hall in Parton, Cumbria.

== Toponymy ==
Cockermouth is "the mouth of the River Cocker"; the river takes its name from the Brythonic Celtic word kukrā, meaning 'the crooked one'. It has frequently been noted on lists of unusual place names.

== History ==
The Romans built a fort at Derventio Carvetiorum, now the adjoining village of Papcastle, to protect the river crossing on a major route for troops heading towards Hadrian's Wall.

The main town developed under the Normans who, after occupying the former Roman fort, built Cockermouth Castle closer to the river crossing; little remains today of the castle thanks to the efforts of Robert the Bruce. The market town developed its distinctive medieval layout, of a broad main street of burgesses' houses, each with a burgage plot stretching to a "back lane": the Derwent bank on the north and Back Lane (now South Street), on the south. The layout is largely preserved, leading the British Council for Archaeology to say in 1965 that it was "worthy of special care in preservation and development."

Although Carlisle was considered the county town of Cumberland, the county's assizes sometimes sat at Cockermouth, and the county's quarter sessions were held alternately at Carlisle and Cockermouth. Prior to the Reform Act 1832, Cockermouth was the usual venue for electing knights of the shire (MPs for the Cumberland constituency). Cockermouth borough was also a parliamentary borough from 1641 to 1918, returning two MPs until 1868 and one thereafter.

=== Market centre ===
The town market pre-dates 1221, when the market day was changed from Saturday to Monday. Market charters were granted in 1221 and 1227 by King Henry III, although this does not preclude the much earlier existence of a market in the town. In recent times, the trading farmers market now only occurs seasonally, replaced by weekend continental and craft markets.

In the days when opening hours of public houses were restricted, the fact that the pubs in Cockermouth could open all day on market days made the town a popular destination for drinkers, especially on Bank Holiday Mondays. The Market Bell remains as a reminder of this period (inset into a wall opposite the Allerdale Hotel), while the 1761 and Castle pub (which spans three floors) have been renovated to reveal medieval stonework and 16th and 18th-century features.

=== Flooding ===
Cockermouth suffered badly in the nationwide floods of 19 and 20 November 2009. Over 200 people needed to be rescued, with helicopters from RAF Valley, RAF Boulmer and RAF Leconfield retrieving about 50 and the remainder being rescued by boats, including those of the RNLI. Water levels in the town centre were reported to be as high as 2.5 metres (8 ft 2 in) and flowing at a rate of 25 knots. Many historic buildings on and adjacent to Main Street sustained severe damage, as did a number of bridges in and around the town. Recovery from the devastation was slow, with residents placed in temporary accommodation and some businesses temporarily relocated to Mitchells auction mart. By the summer of 2011, most of the damage had been repaired and buildings re-occupied, though some remained empty or boarded up.

Flooding occurred again in 2015, when the River Derwent burst its banks on 5 December, with several hundred homes and businesses affected.

The rear part of the Old Courthouse collapsed into the River Cocker in October 2023.

=== Architecture ===
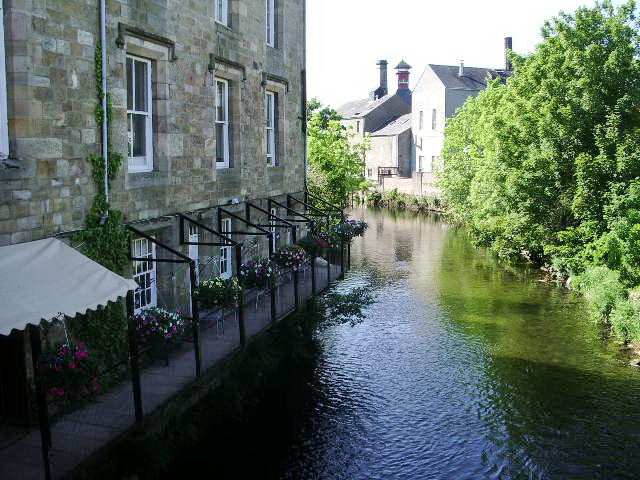
The River Cocker, with the walkway attached to the building

Much of the centre of the town is of medieval origin, substantially rebuilt in Georgian style with Victorian infill. The tree-lined Kirkgate offers examples of unspoilt classical late 17th and 18th-century terraced housing, cobbled paving and curving lanes which run steeply down to the River Cocker. Most of the buildings are of traditional slate and stone construction with thick walls and green Skiddaw slate roofs.

Many of the facades lining the streets are frontages for historic housing in alleyways and lanes (often maintaining medieval street patterns) to the rear. There are examples of Georgian residences near the Market Place, St. Helens Street, at the bottom of Castlegate Drive and Kirkgate.

Cockermouth may have been the first town in Britain to have piloted electric lighting. In 1881, six electric lamps were set up to light the town, together with gas oil lamps in the back streets. The electrical service was intermittent, so the town returned to gas lighting.

In 1964, Cockermouth was named one of 51 Gem Towns in the UK, by the Council for British Archaeology. This recognised the importance of the historic buildings and the need for effective traffic management and urban development.

== Geography ==
Cockermouth owes its existence to the confluence of the rivers Cocker and Derwent, historically being the lowest point at which the resultant fast flowing river powered by the Lake District could be bridged. Cockermouth is situated a few minutes' travelling distance from lakes such as Buttermere, Crummock Water, Loweswater and Bassenthwaite.

=== Climate ===
Cockermouth has a temperate climate that is influenced by the Irish Sea and its low-lying elevation; it receives slightly below average rainfall compared with the UK average. Temperatures are also about average compared with other parts of the UK. The nearest weather station, for which online records are available, is Aspatria, about 7 miles (11 km) north-north-east of the town centre.

The hottest temperatures recorded in the area were 31.3 °C (88.3 °F) at Lorton on 19 July 2006 and 31.1 °C (88.0 °F) at Aspatria during August 1990, with the coldest being −13.9 °C (7.0 °F) during January 1982 at Aspatria and −13.8 °C (7.2 °F) at Lorton on 8 December 2010. West Cumbria gets relatively little snow in comparison with the Lake District and Eastern Cumbria, owing to its proximity to the Irish Sea and its low height above sea level.

Climate data for Aspatria, elevation: 62 metres (203 ft), 1981–2010 normals
Month	Jan	Feb	Mar	Apr	May	Jun	Jul	Aug	Sep	Oct	Nov	Dec	Year
Mean daily maximum °C (°F)	6.8 (44.2)	7.1 (44.8)	9.2 (48.6)	11.9 (53.4)	15.3 (59.5)	17.5 (63.5)	19.3 (66.7)	18.9 (66.0)	16.6 (61.9)	13.1 (55.6)	9.5 (49.1)	6.9 (44.4)	12.7 (54.9)
Daily mean °C (°F)	4.2 (39.6)	4.2 (39.6)	6.0 (42.8)	8.0 (46.4)	10.9 (51.6)	13.5 (56.3)	15.5 (59.9)	15.2 (59.4)	13.0 (55.4)	9.9 (49.8)	6.7 (44.1)	4.1 (39.4)	9.2 (48.6)
Mean daily minimum °C (°F)	1.5 (34.7)	1.3 (34.3)	2.7 (36.9)	4.0 (39.2)	6.5 (43.7)	9.5 (49.1)	11.6 (52.9)	11.4 (52.5)	9.4 (48.9)	6.7 (44.1)	3.9 (39.0)	1.3 (34.3)	5.8 (42.4)
Average precipitation mm (inches)	101.1 (3.98)	74.8 (2.94)	78.6 (3.09)	57.0 (2.24)	58.6 (2.31)	69.9 (2.75)	73.7 (2.90)	89.3 (3.52)	89.8 (3.54)	121.4 (4.78)	104.7 (4.12)	106.6 (4.20)	1,025.6 (40.38)
Average precipitation days (≥ 1.0 mm)	15.3	10.4	13.5	11.4	10.5	10.9	12.0	12.9	12.0	16.1	14.4	14.6	153.9
Mean monthly sunshine hours	47.5	77.0	114.0	159.8	217.1	195.2	191.6	179.8	136.1	98.7	61.2	41.6	1,519.6
Source: Met Office

== Governance ==
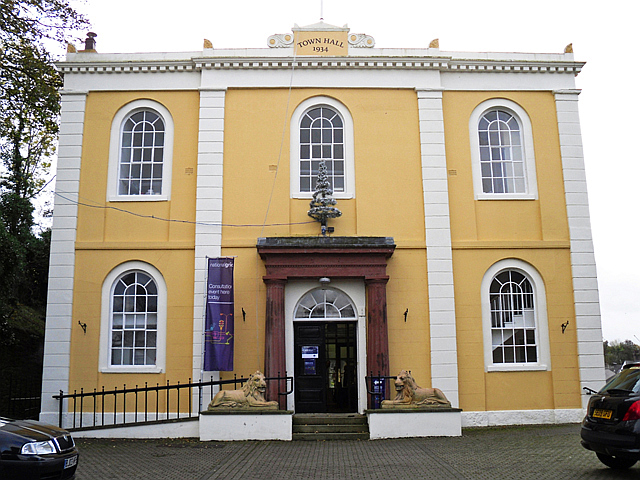
Cockermouth Town Hall

There are two tiers of local government covering Cockermouth, at parish (town) and unitary authority level: Cockermouth Town Council and Cumberland Council. The town council is based at Cockermouth Town Hall on Market Street.

The town has been part of the Penrith & Solway constituency since 2024 and has been represented by Markus Campbell-Savours of the Labour Party since the 2024 general election.

=== Administrative history ===
Cockermouth was historically a township in the ancient parish of Brigham, in the historic county of Cumberland. From the 13th century, the town was described as a borough. It was a seigneurial borough, remaining under the control of the lord of the manor rather than developing its own municipal independence. It was also a parliamentary borough (constituency), returning MPs in 1295 and again from 1640 until 1885, when it was reformed into a wider county constituency of Cockermouth.

The township of Cockermouth took on civil functions under the poor laws from the 17th century onwards. As such, the township also became a civil parish in 1866, when the legal definition of 'parish' was changed to be the areas used for administering the poor laws. In ecclesiastical terms, Cockermouth's church of All Saints (which was rebuilt in 1852–1854 after a fire destroyed the previous building) was a chapel of ease to St Bridget's Church at Brigham until 1806, when Cockermouth became a separate ecclesiastical parish.

In 1864, the township of Cockermouth was made a local government district, administered by an elected local board. Such districts were reconstituted as urban districts under the Local Government Act 1894. The urban district council later acquired a former Wesleyan Methodist Chapel (built 1841) on Market Street and converted it into the Town Hall in 1934.

Cockermouth Urban District was abolished in 1974. The area became part of the borough of Allerdale in the new county of Cumbria. A successor parish of Cockermouth was created covering the former urban district, with its parish council taking the name Cockermouth Town Council. Allerdale was abolished in 2023 when the new Cumberland Council was created, also taking over the functions of the abolished Cumbria County Council in the area.

== Present ==
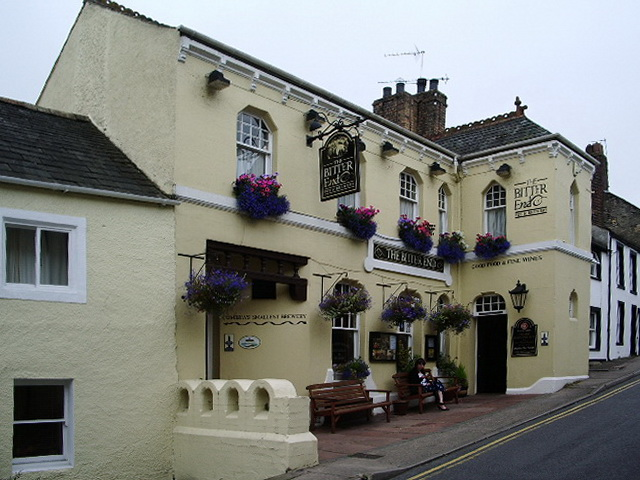
The Bitter End, Kirkgate

The centre of Cockermouth retains much of its historic character and the renovation of Market Place has been completed, now with an artistic and community focus. The Kirkgate Centre is the town's major cultural focus and offers regular historical displays by the Cockermouth Heritage Group in addition to holding major cultural events including theatre, international music and world cinema. The tree-lined main street boasts a statue of Lord Mayo, formerly an MP for Cockermouth, who became British Viceroy of India and whose subsequent claim to fame was that he was assassinated.

The renovated arts and cultural zone in the 13th-century Market Place has undergone something of a regeneration following European Union funding; it is now pedestrian-friendly adorned with stone paving and roadways, underground lighting and seating in bright colours to reflect the area's facades. Pavement art and stonework commemorate eclectic historical events, John Dalton's atomic theory, local dialect, flooding and a curious range other memorabilia.

A shared-use path runs along the former Cockermouth, Keswick and Penrith Railway route and spans a high bridge over the Cocker, affording views of the town and river-scape.

== Landmarks ==
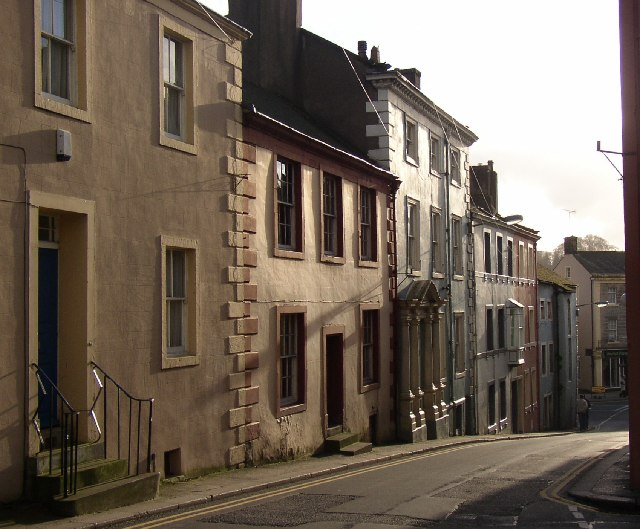
Castlegate

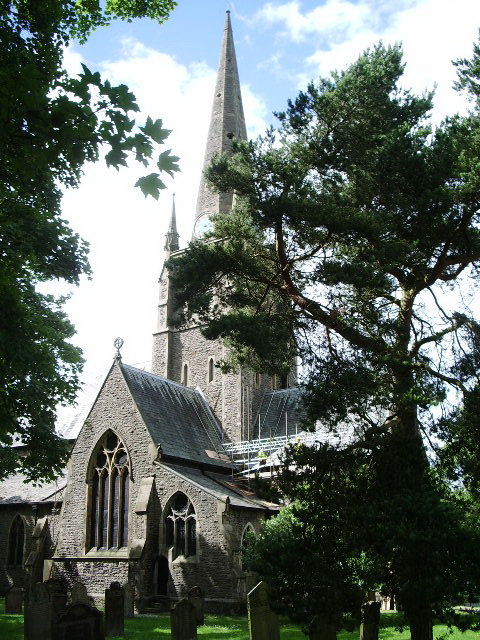
All Saints' Church

Cockermouth Castle is a sizeable but partly ruined Norman castle, formerly the home of the late Pamela, The Dowager Lady Egremont. Built at the confluence of the Rivers Cocker and Derwent, the castle has a tilting tower which hangs Pisa-like over Jennings Brewery buildings. The castle, with its preserved dungeons, is only opened to the public once a year during the annual town festival.

Wordsworth House, the birthplace of William Wordsworth and Dorothy Wordsworth, has been restored following extensive damage during the November 2009 floods; it features a working 18th-century kitchen and children's bedroom with toys and clothes of the times. Harris Park offers riverside walks and views down over the historic town.

Jennings Brewery offered regular public tours and occasional carriage rides pulled by a shire horse. However, the brewery was closed in October 2022, with the buildings valued at £750,000 put up for sale.

Cockermouth Town Hall is a former chapel which was converted for municipal use in 1934.

Culturally, the Kirkgate Centre offers international music, heritage, theatre and world cinema and the town has an annual festival of concerts and performances each summer. Cockermouth has an annual Easter Fair, fireworks display and carnival. In April 2005, it hosted its first Georgian Fair, which was repeated in 2006, again in May 2008 and 2010, with the next fair on 2 May 2015. At Christmas, the town presents festive lighting throughout its main and subsidiary streets, accompanied by competing shop displays.

The main cemetery on the Lorton Road is something of a walkers' garden, featuring streams, humped stone bridges and views of the nearby fells.

The adjoining village of Papcastle is also picturesque in its own right and stands on the site of the Roman fort of Derventio (Papcastle), lined with grand 18th- and 19th-century houses.

Located 2 1/2 miles (4 km) north-west of the town lies Dovenby Hall Estate, a 115-acre (47 ha) park and woodland estate. Dovenby Hall is the home of the Ford Rally team. The estate was bought in January 1998 by Malcolm Wilson for his M-Sport motorsport team and was selected in 1996 by Ford Motorsport to build, prepare and run a fleet of cars for entry into the World Rally Championship.

== Demography ==
The population in the 1841 census was 4,940 inhabitants. At the 2021 census, the parish had a population of 8,847, and the built up area as defined by the Office for National Statistics had a population of 8,860. The population had been 8,761 at the 2011 census.

== Economy and services ==
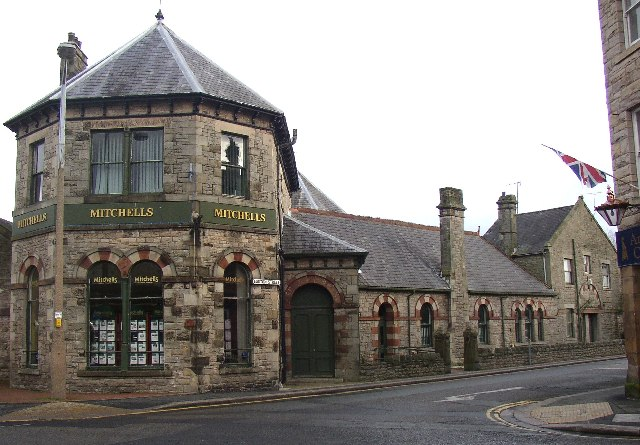
Mitchells auction house

Built as a market town, close to a fast-flowing river in a farming area with a tradition of cloth weaving, Cockermouth became a hub for spinning and weaving. The town had a fulling mill by 1156 and by the mid-19th century there were over forty industrial sites; mills (wool, linen, cotton), hat factories, tanneries and smaller concerns making chairs, churns, mangle rollers, nails and farm machinery.

With the need for steam power, industrialisation declined, but the coming of the railway and the Victorian holiday, together with the power of Wordsworth's publications, meant that Cockermouth became an early inland tourist centre. The local economy is still reliant today on farming and tourism, with light industrial facilities servicing local needs. Industrialisation and hence work has moved to the west coast around Carlisle and Workington, and includes servicing the nuclear facilities at Sellafield.

Road haulier Lawsons Haulage Limited is a major employer in the town.

== Education ==
Cockermouth has two primary schools:

- Fairfield Primary School
- All Saints Church of England Primary School

Cockermouth School is a comprehensive secondary school, with around 1,400 pupils including 310 sixth formers. It won the north of England regional championship in the Kids' Lit Quiz 2009, coming first with 92 points.

In 2023, Whitehaven's Mayfield School opened its sixth form campus to children with special educational needs and disabilities. The site was previously St Joseph's Primary School, which was closed in 2022.

== Transport ==
=== Road ===
The nearest motorway is the M6 at junction 40 in Penrith, which is 30 miles (48 km) away via the A66.

=== Railway ===
The nearest railway stations are at:

- Maryport, for Northern Trains' services between Barrow-in-Furness and Carlisle on the Cumbrian Coast Line
- Penrith and Carlisle, for Avanti West Coast inter-city services on the West Coast Main Line between Glasgow Central and London Euston.

The Cockermouth, Keswick and Penrith Railway once served the town. The original Cockermouth & Workington Railway station was replaced on a new alignment when the Cockermouth railway station opened to passenger traffic on 2 January 1865. The station was immortalised in 1964 in the song "Slow Train" by Flanders and Swann. The station closed on 18 April 1966 and has been completely removed. The site is now occupied by Cockermouth Mountain Rescue and the town's fire station, operated by Cumbria Fire and Rescue Service. The old trackbed is now a shared-use path.

=== Buses ===
Bus services in Cockermouth are operated primarily by Stagecoach Cumbria; key routes include the X4 and X5 to Workington and Keswick, and the 600 to Carlisle. Other routes are operated by Ellenvale Coaches, including the 68 to Maryport.

=== Cycling ===
Two cycle routes pass through the town: the Sea to Sea Cycle Route from Workington to Tyneside, and the Reivers Cycle Route.

== Sport and leisure ==
Cockermouth has a sports centre with swimming pool, two gyms and two parks with riverside walks.

Cockermouth Cricket Club is one of the town's most successful and best supported sports teams. They play their home games at the Sandair Ground, located just off Gote Road. The First XI play in the North Lancashire and Cumbria League Premier Division, Second XI in the third tier of the same league. The club's Third XI play in the Cumbria Cricket League. The junior section of the club runs from under 11s to 15s.

Cockermouth School has an astroturf pitch used for community football, including the local six-a-side league.

Cockermouth Rugby Football Club is based at the former Cockermouth Grammar School site; in 1987, it played the first ever rugby union league match when they played Kirkby Lonsdale when national and regional leagues were formed, the precursors of what have now become the national and premier leagues.

The town has a youth football club, Cockermouth F.C. In the 2007–2008 season, the Under 12 team were County Cup Champions. Cockermouth beat Allerdale Leisure, from Workington, 1–0 in the final.

The opening stage of Tour of Britain Women's cycle race started and ended in Cockermouth.

Cockermouth is also the home of Keswick Field hockey club, having been moved there after a series of astro-turf closures around the West Cumbria. The Club is home to 3 men's teams with the first team being in the North West open, Division 2. There is 1 Ladies team who are in the North West, Women's division 4.

== Notable residents ==
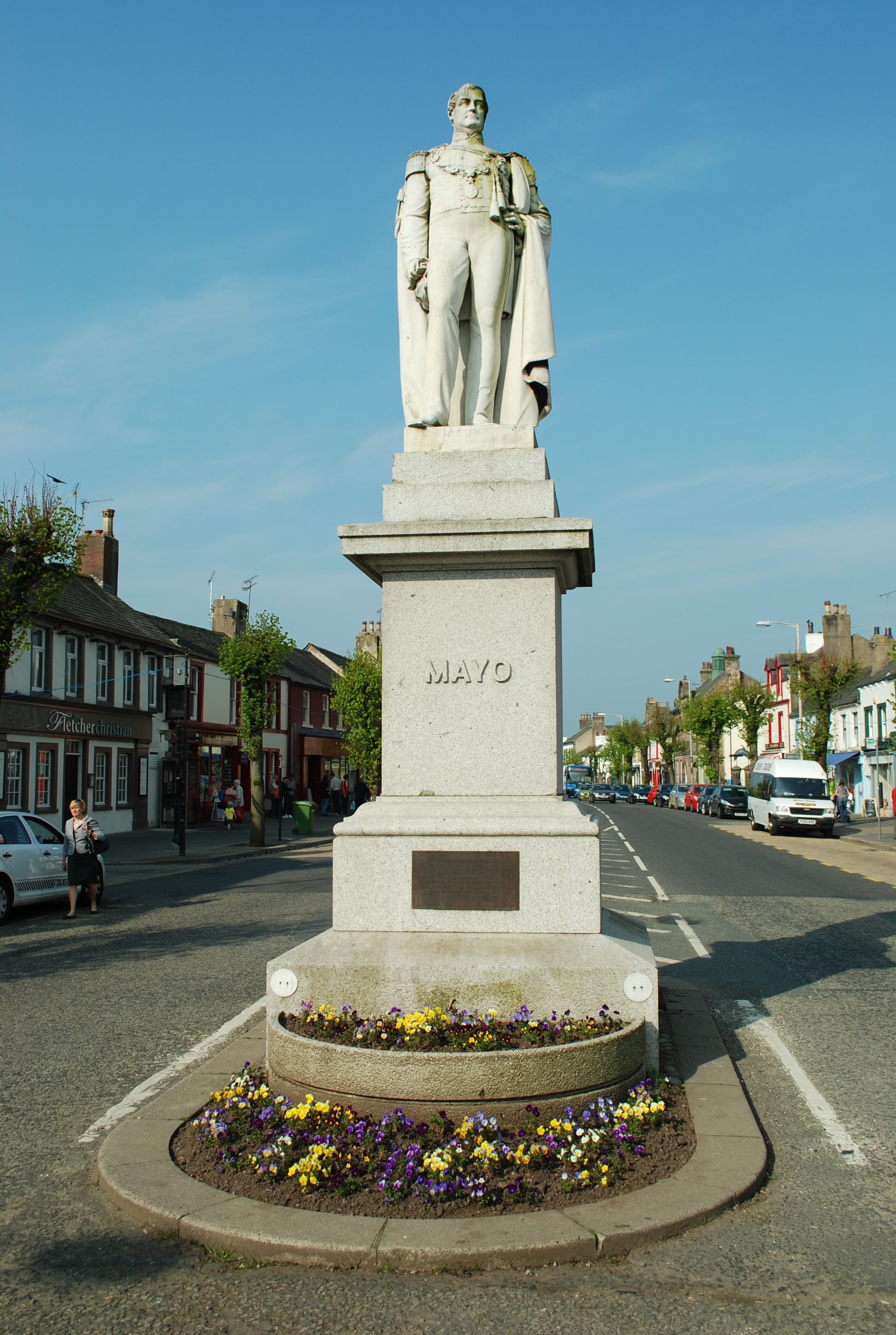
Statue of Lord Mayo

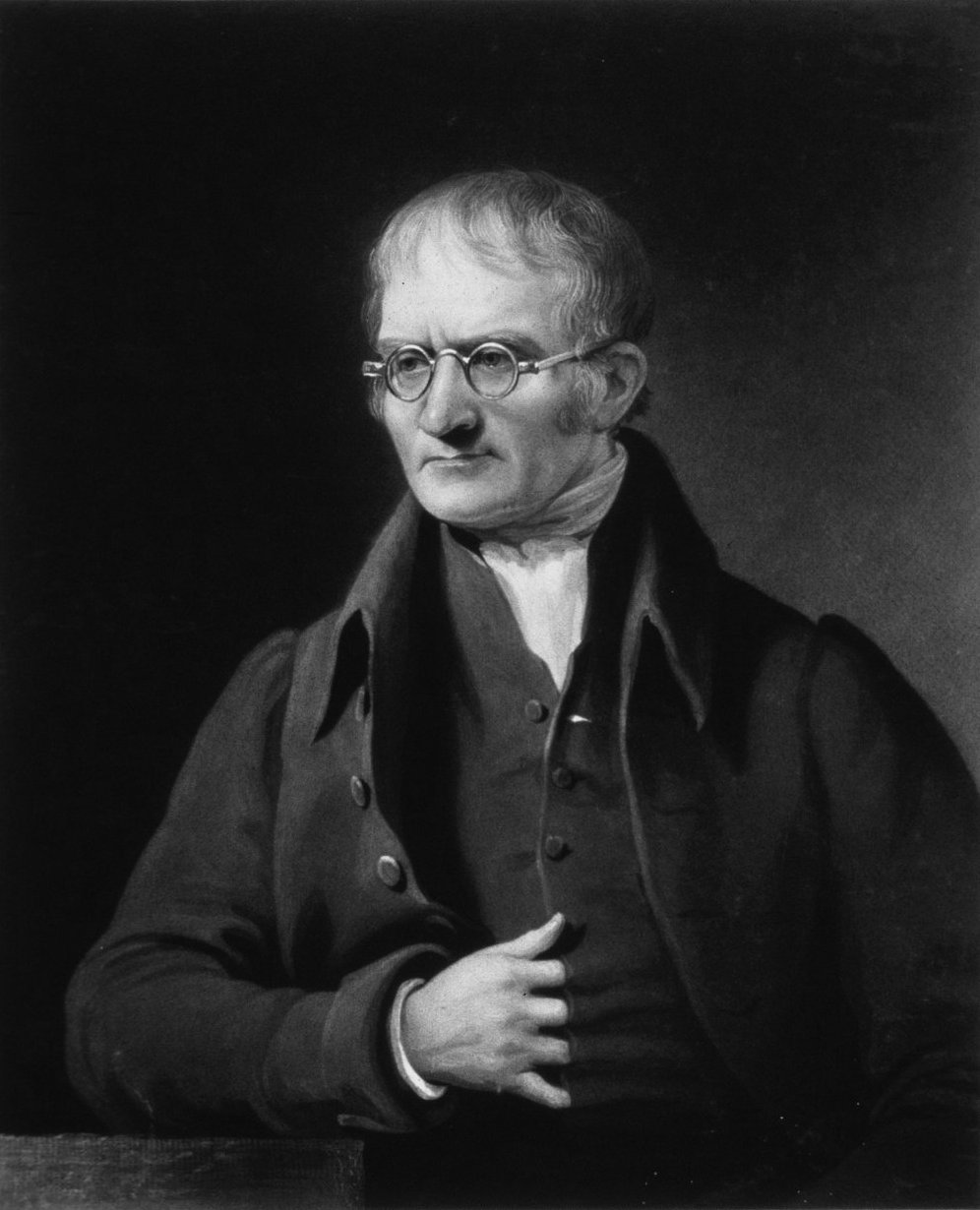
John Dalton, 1834

- Richard Bourke, as Lord Mayo, was the MP for Cockermouth (1857–68) and Viceroy of India (1869–72)
- Dorothy Bradford (1918–2008), painter and printmaker
- Fletcher Christian (1764–c.1793), leader of the mutiny on the Bounty
- Stephanie Connell, auctioneer
- John Dalton (1766–1844), chemist, physicist and meteorologist; introduced the atomic theory into chemistry
- Fearon Fallows (1788–1831), English astronomer & Astronomer Royal
- Luke Greenbank, swimmer
- Robert Milham Hartley (1796–1881), US emigrant & agent of the Association for Improving the Condition of the Poor
- Robinson Mitchell (1821–1888), pioneer auctioneer
- Ben Stokes (born 1991), cricketer
- Jeff Thorpe (born 1972), retired footballer
- James Trafford (born 2002), footballer
- Gareth White (born 1979), cricketer
- Joseph Williamson (1633–1701), civil servant, diplomat and politician
- Matthew Wilson (born 1987), rally driver.
- Dorothy Wordsworth (1771–1855) poet
- William Wordsworth (1770–1850) poet

== Twin town ==
Cockermouth is twinned with Marvejols, France.

== See also ==
- Listed buildings in Cockermouth
