= Old Courthouse, Cockermouth =

Municipal building in Cockermouth, England

The Old Courthouse
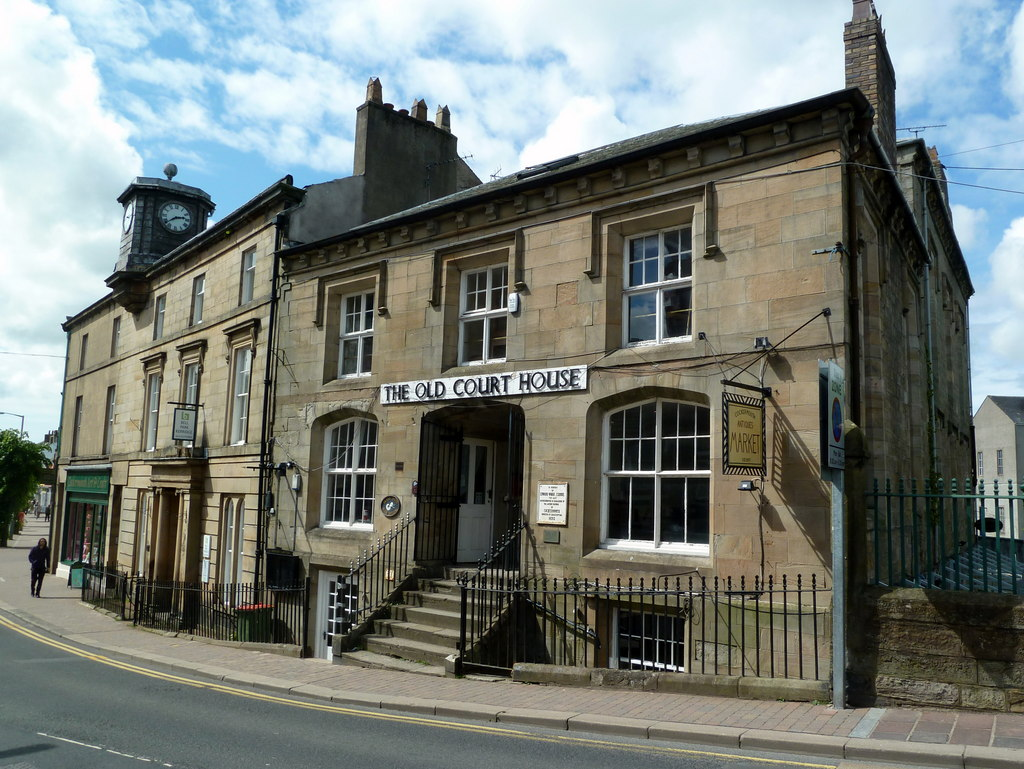
- The building in 2011

- Shown in Cumbria
- 54.6639°N 3.3625°W
- Location: Main Street, Cockermouth

History
- Built: 1829

Site notes
- Architectural style: Tudor Revival style

Listed Building – Grade II
- Official name: The Old Courthouse
- Designated: 26 July 2024
- Reference no.: 1144708

The Old Courthouse is a former judicial building on Main Street in Cockermouth in Cumbria in England. The building, which is currently vacant, is a Grade II listed building.

== History ==
The first municipal building in the town was a moot hall in the Market Place which dated back at least to the 17th century. After it became dilapidated, civic leaders decided to demolish it and to commission a new building. The site they selected was on the north side of the Main Street on the west bank of the River Cocker. The new building, which became known as the courthouse, was financed by public subscription. It was designed in the Tudor Revival style, built at a cost of £1,300 using materials which had been recovered from the Moot Hall and donated by the local landowner, George Wyndham, 3rd Earl of Egremont, and was completed in 1829.

The design involved a symmetrical main frontage of three bays facing Main Street. The centre bay featured a short flight of steps leading up to an opening with a four-centred arch. The other bays on the ground floor were fenestrated by windows with four-centred arches and all the windows on the first floor were fenestrated by sash windows with hood moulds. At roof level, there was a modillioned cornice. Internally, the principal rooms included a courtroom, a bank and a newsroom.

Following significant population growth, largely associated with the status of Cockermouth as a market town, the area became an urban district in 1894. The old courthouse served as the town hall for the new council as well the local judicial facility. A plaque, which had originally fixed to a clock intended to commemorate the life of Edward Waugh, the former Member of Parliament for Cockermouth, was placed on the front of the old courthouse in 1932.

By the early 1930s, in the context of its increasing responsibilities, the council was seeking more substantial facilities. The old courthouse ceased to be the local seat of government when the council relocated to an old Methodist chapel in Market Street in 1934. The old courthouse was subsequently disposed of for commercial use and was owned by one family from the 1970s until well into the 21st century. The building was rented out as a restaurant, operated by the Ryan family as the Honest Lawyer Restaurant, from 2007. (Note: The Honest Lawyer may recall John Graves who was known as the "Honest Lawyer" and was brought up in the town.) Other tenants included an antiques market and a hairdresser.

The building was badly affected during the floods in November 2009, and, after a stone section underneath was eroded in November 2021, it was declared unsafe and temporary repairs were carried out by divers. A London property consultant, Samiul Ahmed, acquired the building at auction, in July 2022.

The rear part of the building collapsed into the River Cocker in October 2023. The owner was put on notice to carry out the repairs in January 2024, but, after discussions with the new owner broke down, Cumberland Council initiated essential stabilisation and demolition works in March 2024. Then, in August 2024 during Storm Lilian, the scaffolding erected to undertake the repair works collapsed into the river.

== See also ==
- Listed buildings in Cockermouth
