= Fallows =

Fallows is a surname. Notable people with the surname include:

- Fearon Fallows (1789–1831), English astronomer
- James Fallows (born 1949), American print and radio journalist
- Samuel Fallows (1835–1922), American clergyman
- Richie Fallows (born 1995), English squash player

== See also ==
- Fallow (disambiguation)
