= Follow through =

Follow through or follow thru may refer to:

- Follow through (cricket), sport term
- "Follow Through (song)", a 2003 pop/soft rock music song and single (2005) by Gavin DeGraw originally on his album Chariot
- Follow Thru (musical), 1929 musical comedy
  - Follow Thru, 1930 film based on the musical

== Other ==
- Barium follow-through, medical imaging
- Small bowel follow-through, medical imaging
- Figure-eight follow through, knot
- Follow Through (project), a US government educational experiment

== See also ==
- Follow (disambiguation)
- Through/thru, in grammar syntax, an adposition (type of preposition)
