= Fallow (disambiguation) =

Fallow is the stage of crop rotation in which the land is deliberately not used to raise a crop.

Fallow may also refer to:

- Fallow (restaurant), a restaurant in London
- Fallow (Fanny Lumsden album), 2020
- Fallow (The Weakerthans album), 1997
- Fallow (color), a pale brown color

== See also ==
- Fallow deer, a ruminant mammal
- Follow (disambiguation)
- Fallows, a surname
