= Cockermouth Castle =

Castle in Cumbria, England

Coordinates: 54.66552°N 3.36122°W

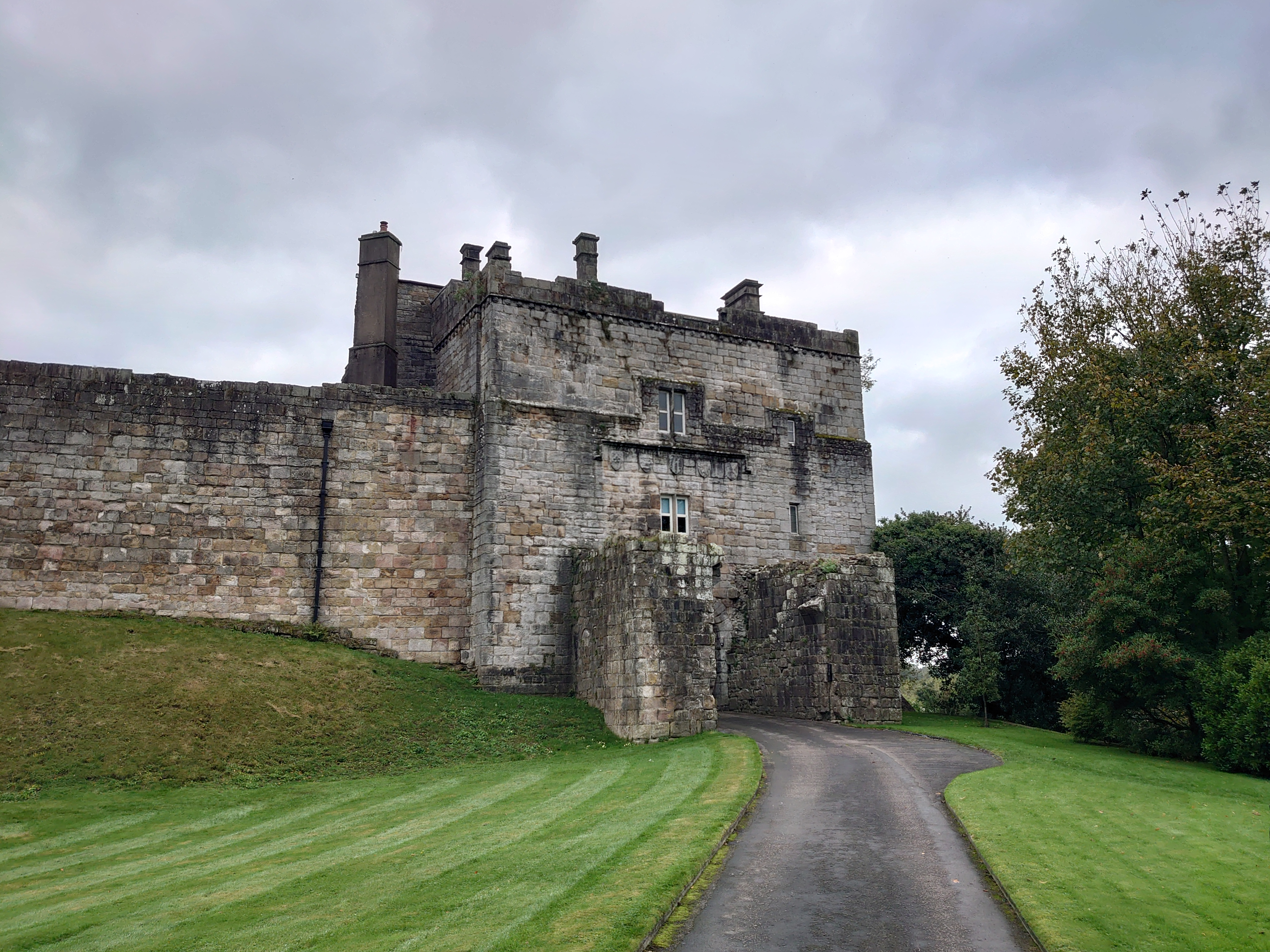
Cockermouth Castle in 2024

Cockermouth Castle (grid reference NY123309) is in the town of Cockermouth in Cumbria on a site by the junction of the Rivers Cocker and Derwent. It is a Grade I listed building and a scheduled monument.

== History ==
The first castle on this site was built by the Normans in 1134. Some of the stone was sourced from the Roman site of Derventio (now Papcastle). Significant additions were made in the 13th and 14th centuries. The castle played a significant role in the Wars of the Roses, and in the Civil War, when it was badly damaged.

Various magnates held the castle, most prominently the Percy Earls of Northumberland from the 15th to 17th centuries. It passed to the Wyndham family, the current owners, in the 18th century.

The castle was the home of the dowager Lady Egremont until her death in 2013.

== Conservation and public access ==
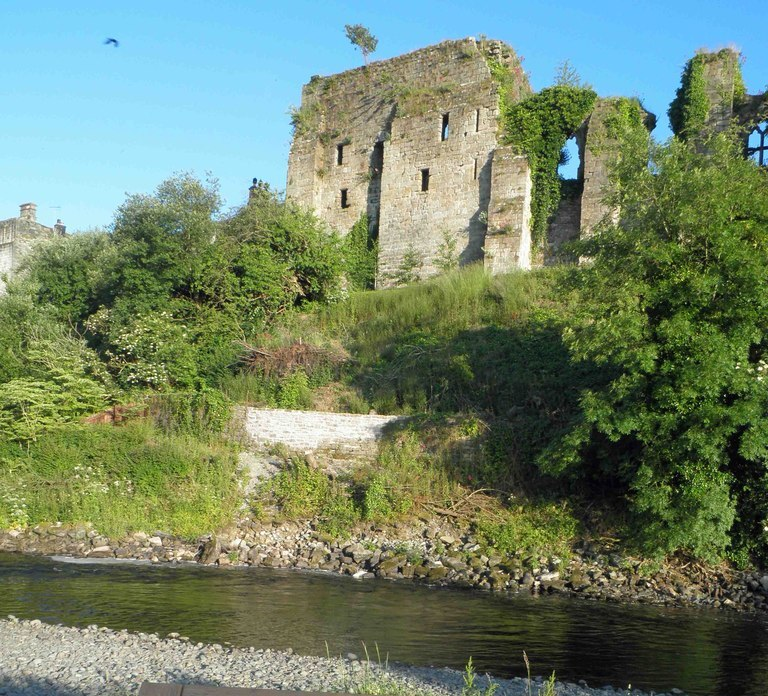
The castle in June 2014

Photograph in 2015 from a news story in the Times and Star showing the bank washed away by flooding.

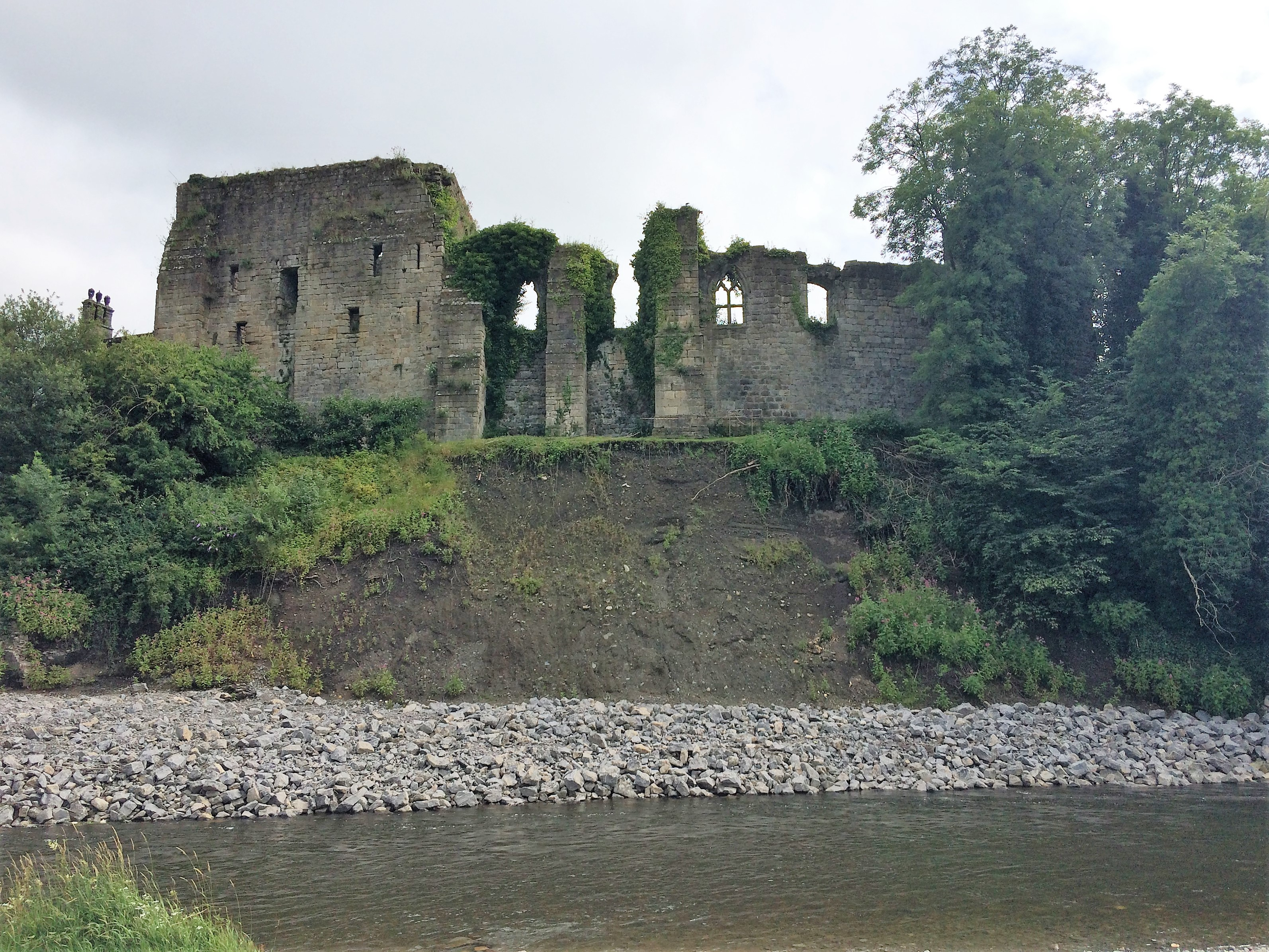
The castle in July 2016

Cockermouth Castle was one of 135 sites from North West England included on the Heritage at Risk Register, maintained by English Heritage and later Historic England. The entry in the 2008 register noted that the "Majority of Castle in good repair. The C13 Bell Tower is badly leaning and potentially dangerous. The C14 Kitchen Tower is suffering from water ingress". The conservation situation was exacerbated in December 2015, when northern England experienced historically heavy rainfall triggering flooding. The flood defences at Cockermouth were overwhelmed, and the weather caused a landslide near the castle, with the river washing away part its bank; Historic England noted that there was a clear risk to the historic structure. The riverbank was reinforced but a permanent solution has yet to be agreed as of 2022.

The castle has been opened to the public as part of the Heritage Open Days scheme.

== See also ==
- Grade I listed buildings in Cumbria
- Listed buildings in Cockermouth
- Castles in Great Britain and Ireland
- List of castles in England
