= Follower =

Follower or variants may refer to:

== People and roles ==
- Follower (Australian rules football), Australian rules football position
- Follower (baseball), a pitching role in baseball
- Follower, a colloquial term for a debt collector
- Camp follower, a civilian who follows in the wake of an army
- Friending and following on social networks
  - Ghost followers
- Groupie, a fan or aficionado

== Arts, entertainment, and media ==
=== Films ===
- Follower (film), an Indian film directed by Harshad Nalawade
- Followers (2000 film), an American film
- Followers (2021 film), a British horror film
- The Follower (1984 film), a Soviet film directed by Rodion Nakhapetov
- The Follower (2014 film), a film directed by Dennis Gansel
- The Followers, a 1939 television film of the play by Harold Brighouse, with Austin Trevor, Marjorie Mars, and Marjorie Lane

=== Literature ===
- "Follower" (short story), a 1990 story by Orson Scott Card
- Follower, novel by Stephen Gallagher
- Followers, teen horror novel by Anna Davies 2014
- "The Follower" (poem), a poem by Seamus Heaney
- Jedi Apprentice: The Followers, a Star Wars novel
- The Follower, novel by Patrick Quentin 1950
- The Follower, novel by Henry Bromell 1983
- The Follower, novel by Jason Starr 2007
- The Followers, by Jude Watson 2002
- The Followers, by Christopher Nicole 2005
- The Followers, a 1915 play by Harold Brighouse, after the story by Elizabeth Gaskell

=== Music ===
- The Follower (album), a 2016 album by The Field, or the title song
- Followers (album), a 2016 album by Tenth Avenue North

=== Television ===
- Rm9sbG93ZXJz, an X-Files episode that signifies "followers" in Base64
- Followers (TV series), a 2020 Japanese streaming television series

== Other uses ==
- Cam follower, a specialized type of roller or needle bearing designed to follow cams.

== See also ==
- Disciple (disambiguation)
- Follow (disambiguation)
- Following (disambiguation)
