= Cockermouth United Reformed Church =

Church in Cockermouth, England

Coordinates: 54°39′50″N 3°22′01″W

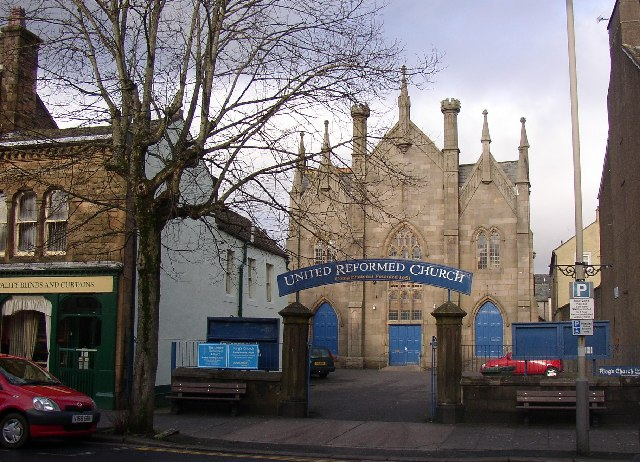
Cockermouth United Reformed Church

Cockermouth United Reformed Church is a congregation first established at Cockermouth, England, in 1651. Originally known as Cockermouth Independent Church, it was later called Cockermouth Congregational Church before acquiring its present name. The congregation met initially in private houses, then settled on using a converted house from 1687. They constructed a chapel in 1719, which was rebuilt in 1735 and then replaced by the present building, which was completed in 1850. The current building, which is a Grade II listed building, lies next to the previous chapel.

== See also ==
- Independent (religion)
- Listed buildings in Cockermouth
