= Gem towns =

The gem towns are 51 British towns chosen by the Council for British Archaeology in 1964 from a list 324 historic towns and cities that were thought to be "particularly splendid and precious". The compilation of the list was in response to the 1963 Colin Buchanan report, Traffic in Towns and the redevelopment of Worcester town centre which was seen as insensitive and causing the loss of many heritage assets. The inclusion of a town on the list is still cited in tourist publicity and local authority development plans.

== Origins and criteria ==
The list was compiled in response to the 1963 Colin Buchanan report, Traffic in Towns. It was also in the wake of the insensitive redevelopment of Worcester town centre, with the loss of many heritage assets. Gem towns have been described as having predominantly tourism-based economies that contrast with towns also worthy of preservation but which do not qualify as "gems" because they have an industrial past, or present, and so are less picturesque.

== Ongoing significance ==
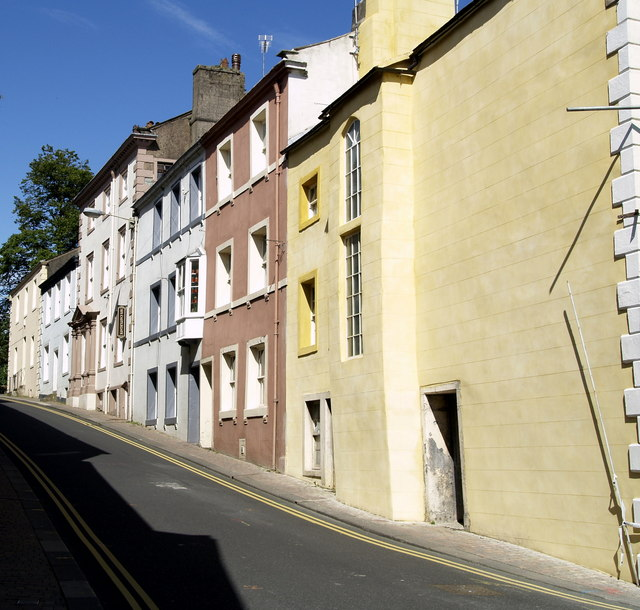
Distinctive architecture in Cockermouth, Cumbria, one of the original "gem towns"

The status as a gem town has been used to resist development which is seen as diminishing the historic and attractive features of a town, such as the proposal to open a large discount store in medieval Cockermouth, Cumbria, in 2018 with those in favour citing the lower prices and greater choice that it would bring to residents who were forced to pay high prices locally or shop elsewhere, while those against argued that it would diminish the appeal of one of the last remaining intact gem towns.

The status of a town as a "gem" also continues to be mentioned in local government tourist publicity and in development plans, for instance in the plan for Whitehaven in 2013, and Lewes in 2015.

== List of gem towns ==
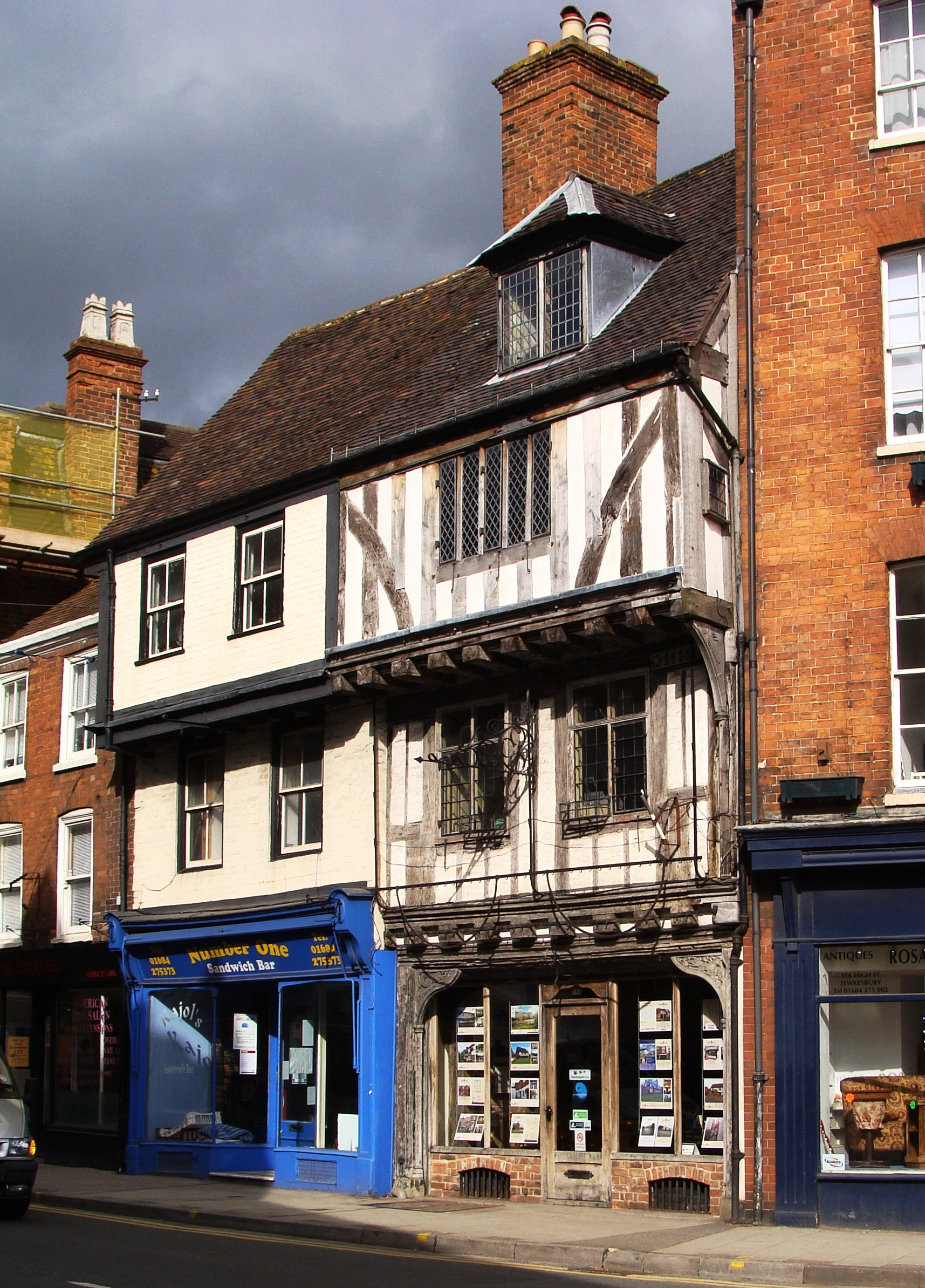
One of the half-timbered buildings in Tewkesbury, Gloucestershire

The following towns and cities were identified as "gems".

- Aberdeen
- Abingdon
- Barnard Castle
- Bath
- Beverley
- Blandford
- Bradford-on-Avon
- Bridgnorth
- Burford
- Cambridge
- Chipping Campden
- Cockermouth
- Colchester
- Conway
- Cromarty
- Culross
- Edinburgh and Leith
- Haddington
- Hadleigh
- Hereford
- Inveraray
- Kelso
- King's Lynn
- Lavenham
- Lewes
- Lincoln
- Ludlow
- Marlborough
- Monmouth
- Newark-on-Trent
- Newcastle upon Tyne
- Norwich
- Oxford
- Pershore
- Richmond
- Rye
- Salisbury
- Sandwich
- Scarborough
- Stamford
- Stirling
- Tenby
- Tewkesbury
- Thaxted
- Totnes
- Warwick
- Wells
- Whitehaven
- Wisbech
- Wymondham
- York
