= Follow =

Follow may refer to:

- Follow (album), the third album by Pakho Chau
- Follow (dancer), one member of a partner dance
- "Follow", a song by Jerry Merrick, popularized by Richie Havens on his 1966 album Mixed Bag
- "Follow", a song by Drowning Pool from their 2001 album Sinner
- "Follow", a song by Breaking Benjamin and is the fourth single from their 2004 album We Are Not Alone
- "Follow", a song by All That Remains from the 2002 album Behind Silence and Solitude
- "Follow", a song by Jeff Watson from the 1993 album Around the Sun
- "Follow", a song by U-Know Yunho from the 2019 album True Colors
- "Follow", a song by Monsta X from 2019 album Follow - Find You
- Following, a feature used by many forms of social media
- Followed (film), a 2018 suspense film
- The Follow Tour, a concert tour by South Korean group Seventeen

== See also ==
- Fallow (disambiguation)
- "Follow Follow"
- Follows
- Follower (disambiguation)
- Following (disambiguation)
