= North Lancashire and Cumbria League =

Cricket League

- Countries: England
- First edition: 1892
- Number of teams: 19
- Current champion: Workington

The Cumbria Cricket League, formerly the North Lancashire and Cumbria League, is an independent club cricket league for teams in Northern Lancashire and Cumbria, England.

Other club cricket leagues in the North West of England include the Northern Premier Cricket League and the designated ECB Premier League Liverpool and District Cricket Competition as well as the independent Lancashire League and Central Lancashire League.

== History ==
In 1892 when the strongest local teams formed the North Lancashire League, while in the same year The Furness and District Cricket was also created.

For the 2015 season, the league structure has changed, meaning there is now a four tier league structure rather than the previous 3 tier, and Division 3 has changed to 40 overs-a-side compared to 50 overs in the other leagues.

For the 2018 season, the league structure changed again, with Division 3 being abolished while the top divisions expanded to include up to 12 teams. Whitehaven 2nd's were the last winners of Division 3. Division 2 is now 40 overs-a-side. The league changed name to the Cumbria Cricket League from the North Lancashire and Cumbria League.

In 2023 a plan was under consideration to amalgamate the Cumbria Cricket League with the Westmorland League and the Eden Valley League.

For the 2025 season, the league saw a number of discussions surrounding the merger of the Cumbria League and Eden Valley leagues,l. The Cumbria Cricket League adopted a 2 division structure - a division 1, with a division 2 north and south, with limited opportunities for promotion and relegation for a number of clubs.

The inter-season period saw a number of teams depart the Cumbria Cricket league for the ECB approved Northern Pyramid structure and ECB registered Northern Premier League - with Carlisle 1st XI (the current league champions) being the most notable Departure. A number of teams (19) however remained, including the addition of some new teams from the Eden Valley League, enabling the new structure to be trialled.

== Participating teams ==
- Carlisle
- Cleator
- Cockermouth
- Dalton
- Egremont
- Furness
- Haverigg
- Hawcoat Park
- Keswick
- Kirkby in Furness
- Lindal Moor
- Millom
- Seascale
- Ulverston
- Vickerstown
- Whitehaven
- Wigton
- Windscale
- Workington

== Past winners ==
- 2000 Barrow
- 2001 Cleator
- 2002 Barrow
- 2003 Millom
- 2004 Furness
- 2005 Millom
- 2006 Cockermouth
- 2007 Workington
- 2008 Workington
- 2009 Furness
- 2010 Furness
- 2011 Furness
- 2012 Cockermouth
- 2013 Furness
- 2014 Furness
- 2015 Furness
- 2016 Workington
- 2017 Workington
