= Gareth White =

English cricketer

Personal information
- Full name: Gareth Andrew White
- Born: 28 January 1979 (age 47); Whitehaven, Cumbria, England
- Batting: Right-handed
- Bowling: Right-arm off-break
- Role: Batsman

Domestic team information
- Years: Team
- 2002: Cumberland
- Only LA: 29 August 2002 Cumberland v Nottinghamshire Cricket Board

Career statistics
Competition	List A
Matches	1
Runs scored	0
Batting average	0.00
100s/50s	0/0
Top score	0
Balls bowled	30
Wickets	1
Bowling average	28.00
5 wickets in innings	0
10 wickets in match	0
Best bowling	1/28
Catches/stumpings	1/–
- Source: CricketArchive, 2 December 2008

Gareth Andrew White (born 28 January 1979) is an English cricketer who played one List A fixture for Cumberland County Cricket Club. He also played at minor counties level for Cumberland County Cricket Club and also represented Leicestershire, Northamptonshire and Kent Second XIs.

With a successful record at Cumbria Schools Cricket Association from Under 13 level to Under 19 level, White was selected for the North of England Schools at both Under 14 and Under 19 levels, with mixed success.

After becoming the youngest player to score a century in the Cumbria Cricket League at 15 for Cockermouth, White joined Netherfield in the Northern League aged 17, and became the youngest centurion in that league, scoring 115 not out against Blackpool at Parkside Road. Netherfield won their first league title in that season.

White represented Leicestershire Second XI in two fixtures in 1997, against Northamptonshire Second XI at Grace Road in August and against Lancashire Second XI at Aigburth in September.

White was then signed by Ashwood CC in the Eastern Suburbs Cricket Association of Melbourne to become their overseas player for the 1997–98 season. He performed well in Australia and returned to the UK for pre-season matches with Leicestershire.

After being impressed with White the previous year, Northamptonshire offered him a one-year contract in April 1998. White made his Second XI Championship debut in the win at Worcestershire, scoring 49, and he made his 50-over debut in July, and scored his highest score (57) in the victory over the Minor Counties Under–25's at North Runcton. Two centuries followed for the Northamptonshire Colts, and White finished the season having played in seven Second XI Championship games, as Northamptonshire completed the 'double', winning the Championship and 50-over competition. Tipped to make his first-class debut, White was named 12th man for the match against Yorkshire at Wantage Road in May, but did not get another opportunity; despite averaging 26.16 in Championship matches and 33.50 in the one-day Trophy, White was released from the full-time staff at the end of the season.

White scored two centuries at Minor County level: 138 opening the batting v Buckinghamshire in July 2002, and 110 v Northumberland in August 2006.

After spells as club professional at Cockermouth and Keswick (2001 and 2002 respectively), White returned for a second stint at Netherfield in 2003 and stayed for three seasons as wicket-keeper/batsman, scoring three more centuries, including 159* v Leyland in 2004. His final Netherfield season was hampered by a hamstring injury.

In 2006, White returned to Cockermouth following double knee surgery in January and was a key member in the team's North Lancashire and Cumbria Cricket League Premier Division Championship win that season. In 2007, White was named as the club captain.

Alongside coaching and playing, White graduated with a 2:1 in Business and Management Studies with ICT from St Martin's College, Lancaster in 2002.
