= Robinson Mitchell =

British auctioneer

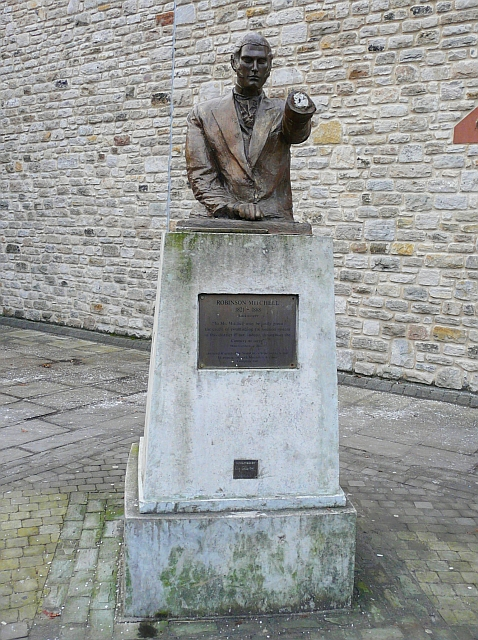
Statue of Robinson Mitchell

Robinson Mitchell was an English auctioneer who pioneered the auctioning system which is widely used today, as he realised taking bids from buyers was more efficient than the haggling between individuals which went on before. At Cockermouth in 1865, he set up what is believed to be the first purpose-built livestock auction market in the country. The business he founded moved their livestock operation out of town in 2002. Sainsbury's acquired the vacated site and paid for this statue, by sculptor Liz Gwyther, to be erected outside the supermarket. It has suffered persistent and expensive vandalism – a hand with a pointing finger has been lopped off the left arm, and a gavel prized away from the right. A photo of how the statue used to look can be seen on the Cockermouth website.
