= Wordsworth House =

Grade I listed historic house museum in the United Kingdom

Coordinates: 54.663623°N 3.368026°W

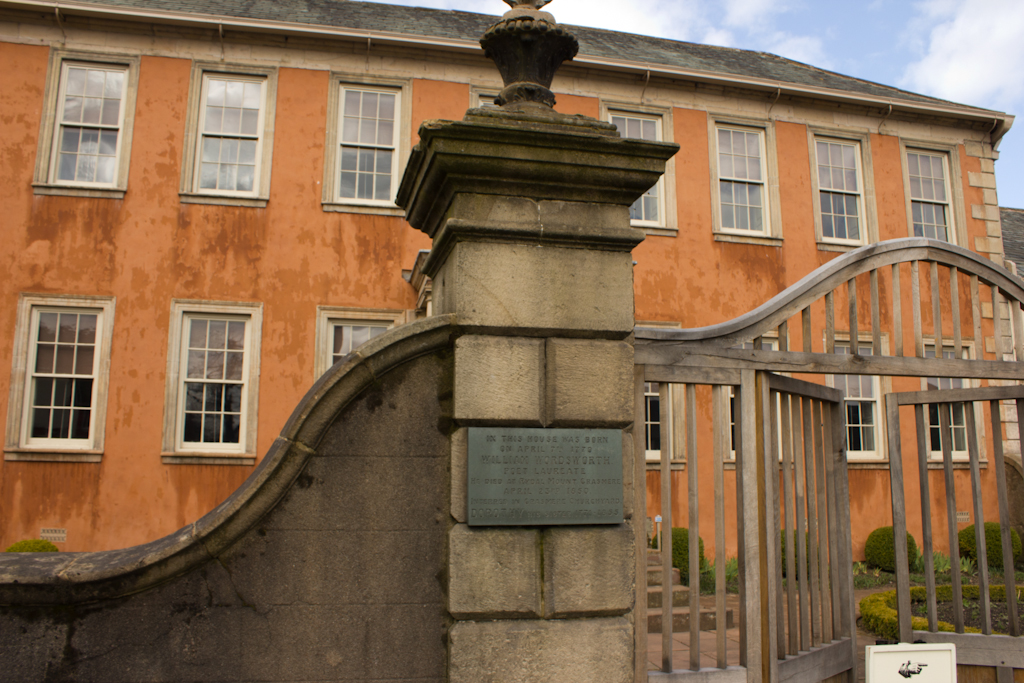
Wordsworth House on Main St, Cockermouth

Wordsworth House is a Georgian townhouse situated in Cockermouth, Cumbria, England, and in the ownership of the National Trust. It was built in the mid-18th century. William Wordsworth was born in the house in 1770. The house is a Grade I listed building. It is open to the public as a writer's house museum from March to October each year.

== History ==
The house was built in 1745 for Joshua Lucock who was then the High Sheriff of Cumberland. It was sold in 1761 to James Lowther, 1st Earl of Lonsdale, who allowed his agent John Wordsworth and Anne Cookson to live there rent free, where William Wordsworth, Dorothy Wordsworth, and their brothers Richard, John, and Christopher Wordsworth were born. Wordsworth lived there until his mother died in 1778, when he was about eight years old. After his father died in 1783, the house was emptied. It remained a private property until the 1930s, when it was sold to a local bus company who intended to demolish it and build a bus station.

After a national campaign, the building was purchased and donated to the National Trust in 1938. Wordsworth House was designated a Grade I listed building on 28 August 1951. In November 2009, Cumbria was hit by flooding. Wordsworth House was one of many historic houses in the region to be affected by the floods, but volunteers were able to move many of the historical artefacts to the dry floors of the house.

== Building ==
The building is located at Main Street, Cockermouth. It was built in 1745, made of stone, with stone quoins. The door has doric columns either side, There is a small garden to the front.

== See also ==
- Grade I listed buildings in Cumbria
- Listed buildings in Cockermouth
- Dove Cottage
- Rydal Mount
