= Cockermouth Town Hall =

Municipal building in Cockermouth, Cumbria, England

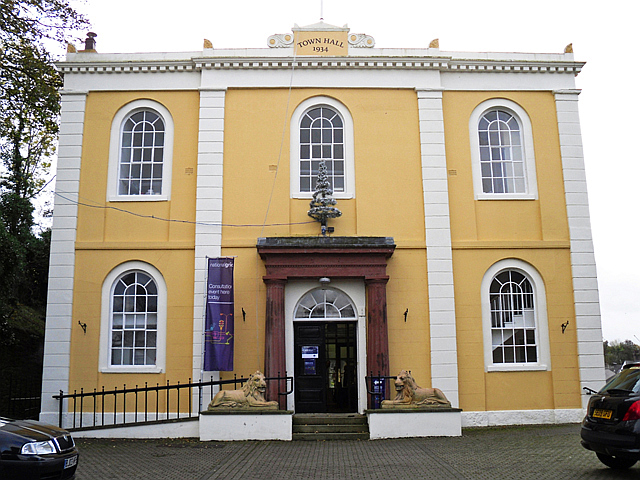
- Cockermouth Town Hall

- Shown in Cumbria
- 54.6632°N 3.3620°W
- Location: Market Street, Cockermouth

History
- Built: 1841

Site notes
- Architectural style: Neoclassical style

Listed Building – Grade II
- Official name: Town Hall
- Designated: 26 July 1974
- Reference no.: 1055821

Cockermouth Town Hall is a municipal structure in Market Street, Cockermouth, Cumbria, England. The structure, which is the meeting place of Cockermouth Town Council, is a Grade II listed building.

== History ==
The first municipal building in the town was a moot hall in the Market Place which dated back at least to the 17th century. After it became dilapidated, civic leaders decided to demolish it and to commission a new courthouse on the north side of Main Street in 1829. Following significant population growth, largely associated with the status of Cockermouth as a market town, the area became an urban district in 1894. The courthouse served as the town hall for the new council as well the local judicial facility.

By the early 1930s, in the context of its increasing responsibilities, the council was seeking more substantial facilities. An opportunity arose to acquire an old Wesleyan chapel in Market Street. The chapel had been designed in the neoclassical style, built with a stucco finish at a cost of £1,800 and been completed in 1841. It was extended in 1893, but following the Methodist Union of 1932, the congregations of the local Methodist chapels in the town decided to consolidate their places of worship at a new chapel in Lorton Road. The council bought the empty chapel in Market Street from the Methodist Church for £362 in 1934 and subsequently converted it into a municipal facility.

The design of the converted structure involved a symmetrical main frontage with three bays facing north along Market Street; the central bay featured a doorway with a fanlight flanked by fluted Doric order columns supporting an entablature. The outer bays on the ground floor and all three bays on the first floor were fenestrated by round headed windows. The bays were flanked by full height pilasters supporting a dentiled cornice with acroteria and, at roof level, there was a central panel inscribed with the words "Town Hall" and the date of conversion.

The town hall continued to serve as the headquarters of the urban district council for much of the 20th century, but ceased to be the local seat of government when the enlarged Allerdale District Council was formed in 1974. Instead it became the offices and meeting place of Cockermouth Town Council as well as the home of the local tourist information centre. In October 2016, it also became an approved venue for weddings and civil partnership ceremonies. A large 17th century linen chest was installed in the entrance hall in August 2017.

== See also ==
- Listed buildings in Cockermouth
