= Cockermouth Cricket Club =

Cockermouth Cricket Club was founded in 1823 in the historic market town of Cockermouth. That year is on the club's crest along with "The Daffodils" (of William Wordsworth fame), Cockermouth Castle and the club colours of green and gold. The early years saw the club renting its Sandair home from the wealthy Senhouse family. It is commonly misconceived that the club played on the grounds in front of the large Senhouse mansion at one time but Cockermouth Cricket Club have, in its long history, only ever had one ground; Sandair. This was eventually purchased from the Senhouse family and became property of the club. Many photographs which adorn the walls of the current Sandair pavilion are testament to the growing interest in the area during the Victorian era. In particular, a photograph of Cumberland versus Westmorland exists from the late 1800s fixture on the Sandair Ground.

== 1900 to 1950 ==
Within this period, the club's facilities developed dramatically. Initially, the Player's Pavilion was located on the Gote Road side of the playing area (opposite where the modern day pavilion is). Eventually though, the pavilion transferred to the side of the ground where it is today, albeit in a smaller guise than the modern building. Two changing rooms, tea rooms and toilet facilities are what comprised the early pavilion. There was no vehicle access to the pavilion at this time so players walked across the playing area to access the pavilion.

It was around this time that two families whose names were to become synonymous with the Sandair club became involved with the club. The Denhams and the James. Several members of these families are honoured either by memorial plaques or by life membership of the club.

== 1950 to 2000 ==
During this golden period for the club on the field, facilities improved greatly and several members of the club came to prominence both on and off the field. In terms of facilities, further pavilion developments saw: a licensed bar introduced, changing room expansions, kitchen improvements and outdoor toilets moved inside.

Many individuals have shaped the Cockermouth Club over the past 75 years. Some have stayed at the club for a short while, others for longer. Either way, the ethos and tradition laid down over many years has shaped the way that the club conducts itself even in the modern era.

The first of these individuals is Raymond Glover Layton Denham. J.D. as he is commonly known, played for the club First and Second XI's, captaining the latter in the late 1970s / early 1980s. In his heyday, Denham bowled leg-cutters and was a hard-hitting lower order batsman. His service to the club both during and since his playing days has been immeasurable. The Sandair Ground would not be anything like the standard it is today were it not for his hard work. Even in winter, barely a day goes by without Raymond Denham doing some work on the ground or with the machinery in the garages adjoining the ground.

Maurice Andrews played mainly for the club's Second XI although he did move frequently between the Firsts and Seconds depending on selection at the time. He was noted for having a 'rocket arm', which could reach the stumps from anywhere on the ground. He also once recorded the incredible figures of 1 over 0 maidens 18 runs and 3 wickets during a fixture against Edenhall. It was after his playing career finished that Maurice's most notable work for the club took place. As treasurer, he single-handedly raised thousands of pounds for the club through a variety of channels; especially enjoying the traditions of raffle draws and 'pie and pea' fixtures.

Ken White, father of current club Captain Gareth was the most notable in a playing sense. In his First XI career, which he began as a 15-year-old in 1957, Ken played for the Firsts in the 1950s to the 2000s. During his career, over 25,000 First XI runs and over 1,000 First XI wickets were taken. Ken also captained the Firsts for 14 years, winning several Cumberland Senior League Division One titles, Burton Cups and also to the club's first ever Meageen (County) Cup crown in 1966.

George Todhunter is the man who has been fundamental in the club's organisation and development over the past 25 years or so. Without his endeavours, the facilities players and spectators enjoy today, would be simply in the pipeline. From the 1970s onwards, George's expertise in architecture and design have helped the pavilion facilities develop into a thoroughly modern area. The 2009 floods, which decimated Sandair, saw George undertaking a variety of jobs. The whole ground was re-laid, partly funded by grants sourced by George and pavilion and flood defence work, in order to prevent future damage, was implemented in time for the club to start the 2010 season back on their home ground.
