= Fearon Fallows =

English astronomer

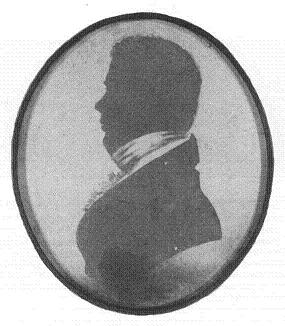
- Born: 4 July 1788; Cockermouth in Cumbria
- Died: 25 July 1831 (aged 43); Simon's Town, South Africa
- Education: St John's College, Cambridge
- Spouse: Mary Anne Hervey
- Scientific career
- Fields: Astronomer

Fearon Fallows (4 July 1788 – 25 July 1831) was an English astronomer.

== Life ==
He was born in Cockermouth in Cumberland in 1788, (Note: Birth year not 1789 as claimed by some sources) the son of John Fallows, a weaver, and his wife Rebecca Fallas. He was taught by his father to read, and learned Latin and maths, and worked as a Parish Clerk in the nearby village of Bridekirk. Due in some part to the dedication of his father and the generosity of the townspeople, the scholarly Fearon was given the funds to attend St John's College, Cambridge, where he studied mathematics, coming third in his year when he graduated in 1813.

He obtained his Master of Arts in 1816 and went on to teach mathematics at Corpus Christi College, Cambridge. He also became a Fellow of St John's College, Cambridge and an ordained priest in the Church of England. On 29 February 1820 he was elected a fellow of the Royal Astronomical Society and on 8 June 1820 he was granted a fellowship of the Royal Society. One of his proposers for his fellowship to the Royal Society was John Herschel (son of William Herschel) whom he met at St John's College, Cambridge. Later in that year he was appointed by the Admiralty to be the astronomer at the Cape of Good Hope, which would involve overseeing the building of an observatory in what was then a British colony.

Before travelling to South Africa, he married Mary Anne Hervey, on 1 January 1821.

Between 1821 and 1829 he worked to site, plan and develop the observatory, which was the first astronomical observatory in the southern hemisphere. He also served the Church of England in his time there.

He, and all the observatory staff, caught scarlet fever in 1830 and, still director of the observatory, he died of scarlet fever in Simon's Town, South Africa in 1831 at the age of forty-three.

== Astronomical work ==
He was the astronomer to King George IV, and catalogued over 300 stars from his observatory in South Africa.

When he first arrived, he only had two portable instruments and a clock, perhaps a Harrison clock. The instruments were a Circle and a Transit Instrument. When the observatory was built, he used a Jones Mural Circle and a Dolland Transit Circle.

== Cockermouth connection ==
The life and work of Fallows is commemorated in Cockermouth by infoboards, in the Old Kings Arms Lane and Lowther Went, and inside the Kirkgate Arts Centre.

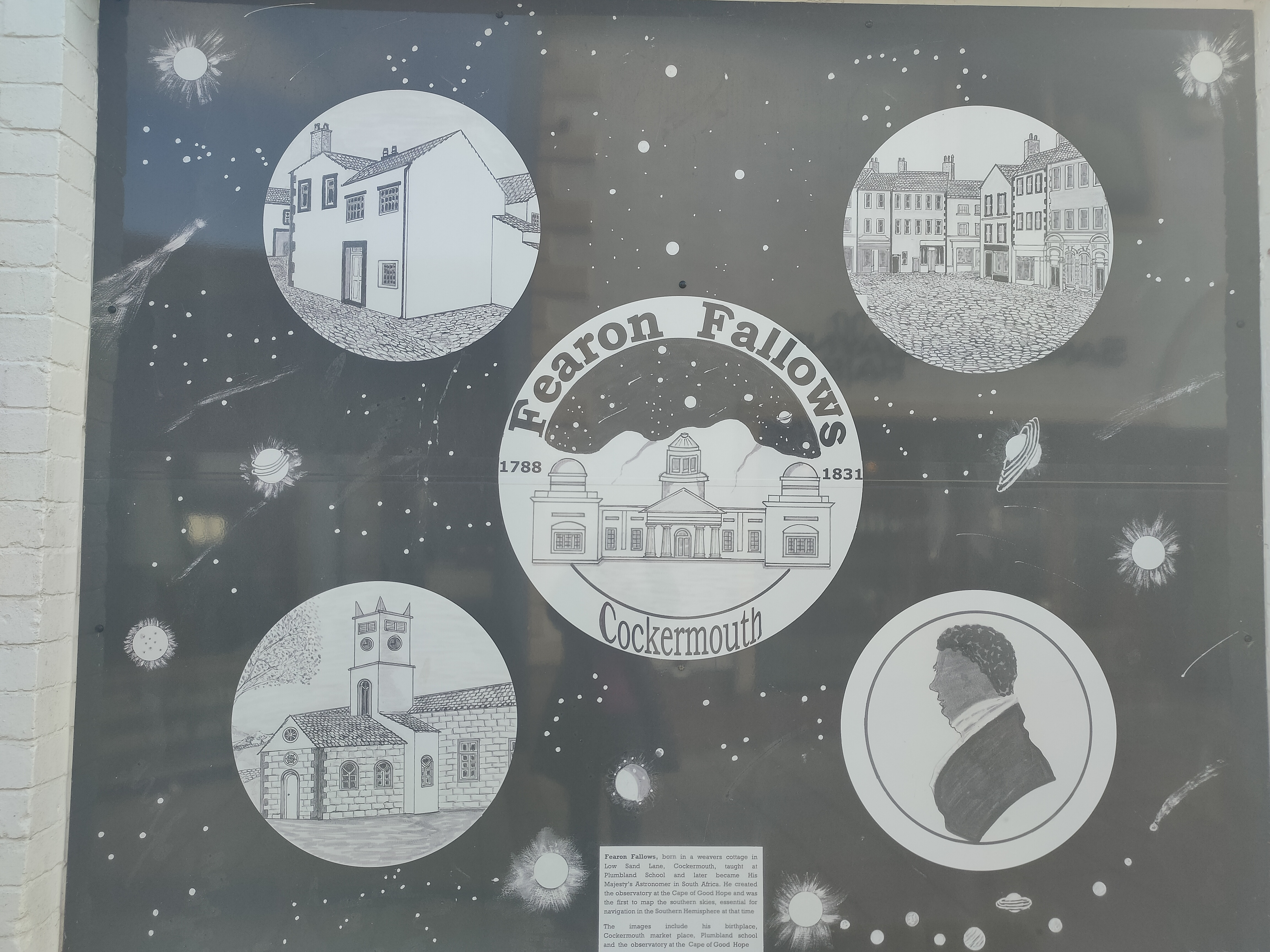
Info board about Fearon Fallows in town of birth

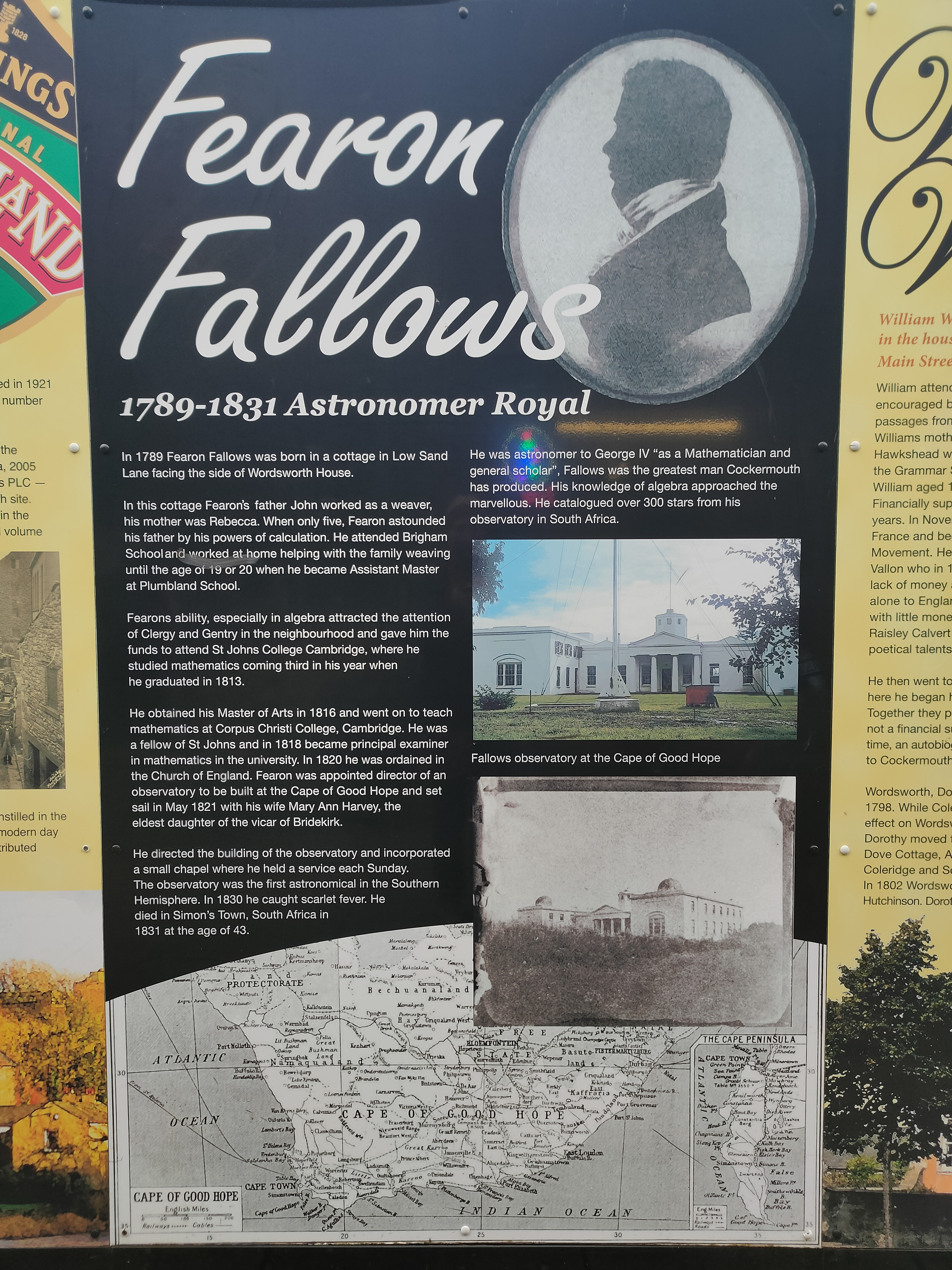
Fearon Fallows infoboard in lane in town of birth

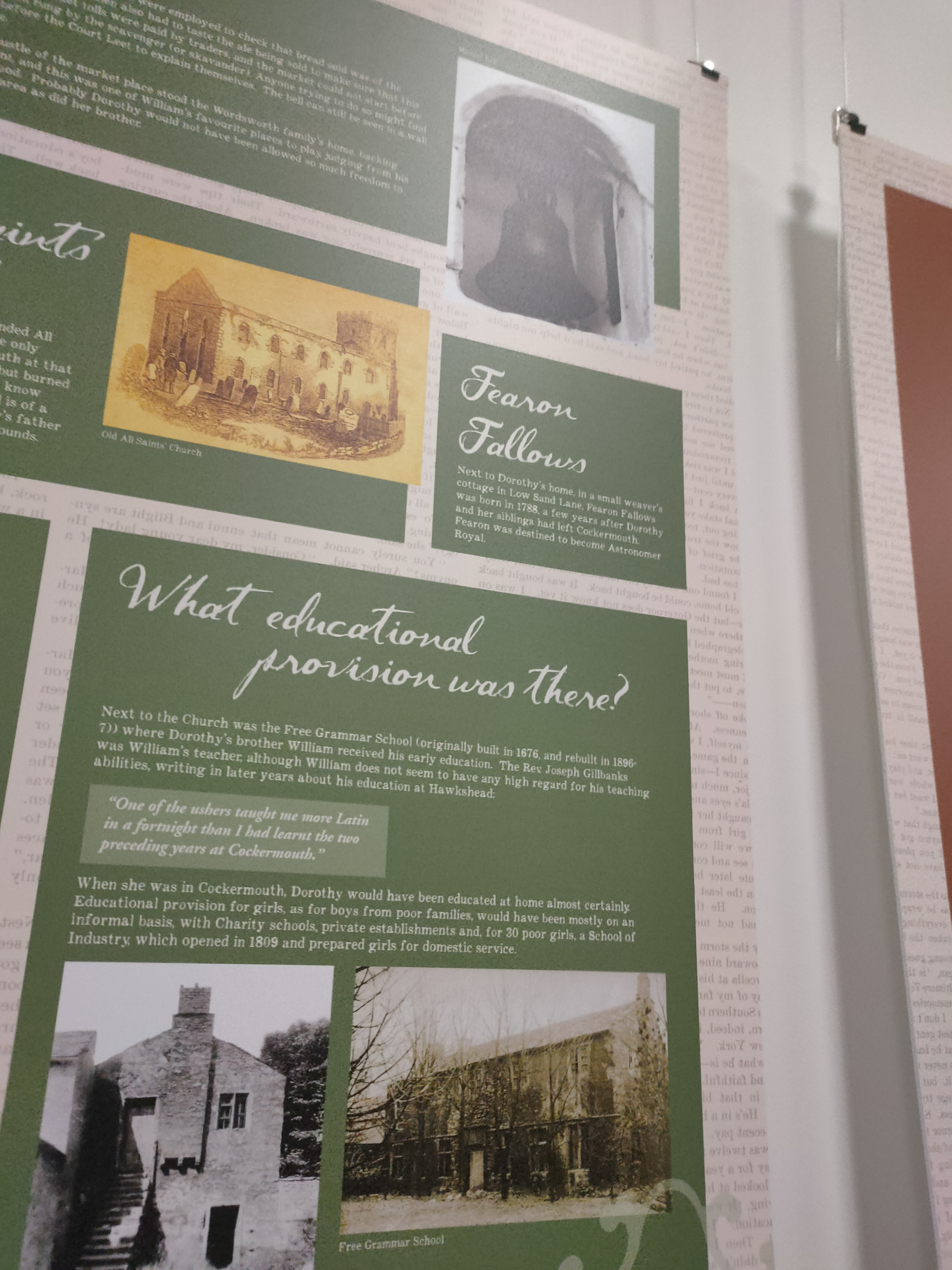
Mention of Fearon Fallows in an Arts Centre in the town of his birth

== Publications ==
- Fallows, Fearon (1822). "Communication of a Curious Appearance Lately Observed upon the Moon". Philosophical Transactions of the Royal Society of London. 112. Royal Society: 237–238. doi:10.1098/rstl.1822.0018. JSTOR 107681.
- Fallows, Fearon (1824). "A Catalogue of Nearly all the Principal Fixed Stars between the Zenith of Cape Town, Cape of Good Hope, and the South Pole". Philosophical Transactions of the Royal Society of London. 114: 457–470. doi:10.1098/rstl.1824.0027.
