= Follows =

Follows is a surname. Notable people with the surname include:

- Dave Follows (1941–2003), British cartoonist
- Denis Follows (1908–1983), British sports administrator
- Geoffrey Follows (1896–1983), British colonial administrator
- Megan Follows (born 1968), Canadian-American actress
