= Following (disambiguation) =

Following is a 1998 British neo-noir film directed by Christopher Nolan.

Following may also refer to:

- Cult following, a group of fans who are highly dedicated to a specific area of pop culture

== In media and entertainment ==
- Following (solitaire), a solitaire card game which uses a deck of playing cards
- "Following", a 1987 song by the American pop band The Bangles
- "Following", a 2015 song by Scottish musician Momus from his 2015 album Turpsycore
- Following (EP), a 2017 extended play by South Korean singer Hyuna
- The Following, a 2013 American television drama series for the Fox Broadcasting Company
- Dying Light: The Following, a video game expansion pack, released in 2016
- Friending and following, a feature on social media sites
- Following (2024 film), a 2024 South Korean film directed by Kim Se-hwi

== See also ==
- Follow (disambiguation)
