= Fallow (restaurant) =

Restaurant in London, England

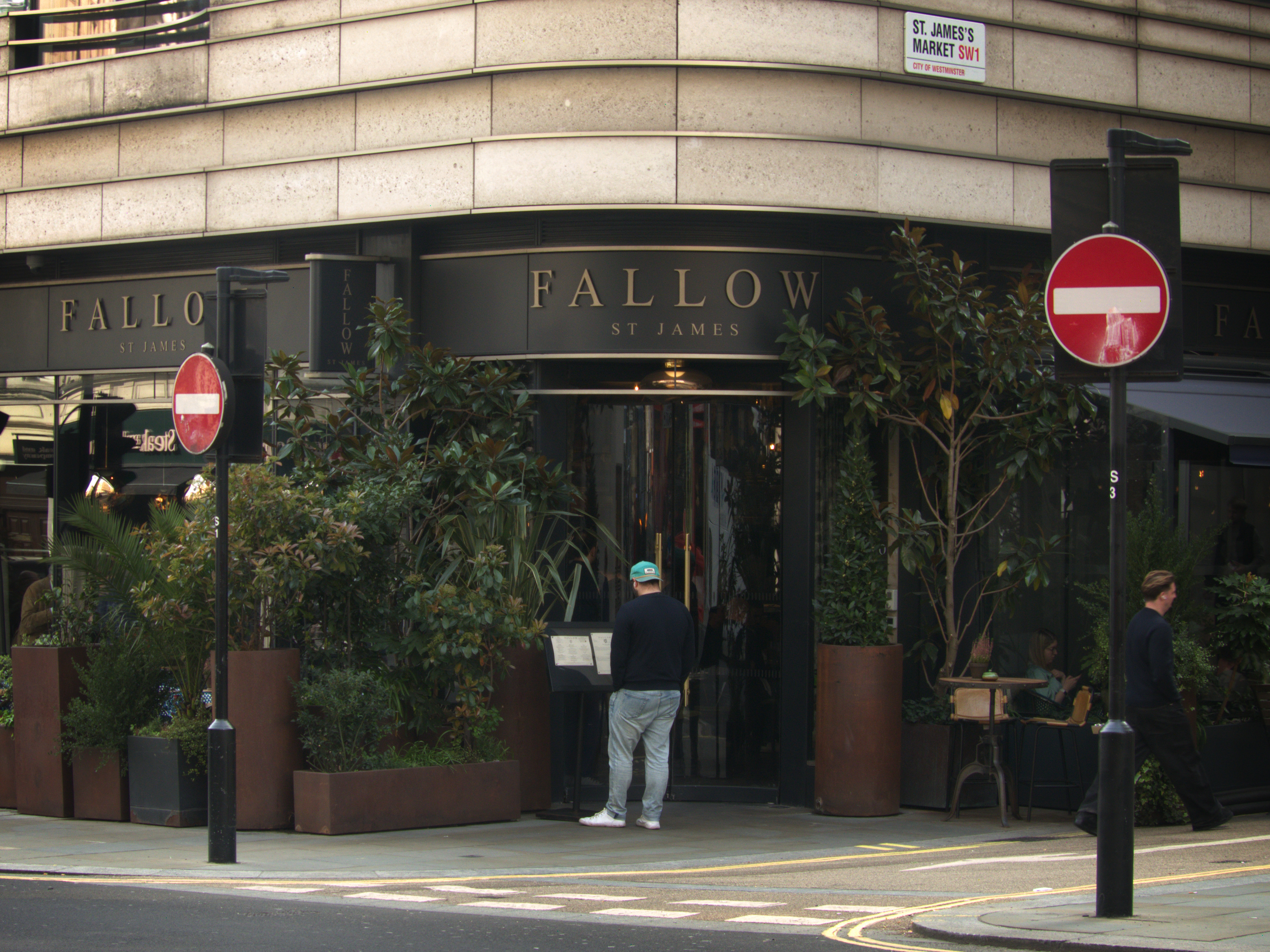
- The entrance to Fallow on Haymarket in 2026.
- Interactive map of Fallow

Restaurant information
- Established: May 2019
- Head chef: William Murray; Jack Croft
- Food type: Modern British
- Dress code: Casual
- Location: 52 Haymarket, London, SW1Y 4RP, England
- Coordinates: 51°30′33″N 0°07′58″W
- Website: fallowrestaurant.com

Fallow is a restaurant located in London, England. The restaurant serves modern British cuisine, with an emphasis on sustainable cooking. It has been listed as a Bib Gourmand restaurant in the Michelin Guide since 2021.

The restaurant has a YouTube channel presenting gourmet recipes and cooking filmed within the restaurant, which has amassed over 2 million subscribers.

In May 2019, the first iteration of Fallow was founded by chefs Jack Croft and William Murray, along with entrepreneur James Robson. Croft and Murray had previously been chefs for Dinner by Heston Blumenthal. After a series of pop-up restaurants under the Fallow name, a permanent location was established at St James's Market in 2021. In October 2023, Croft, Murray and Robson opened a fried chicken restaurant called Fowl, also in St James's Market. In April 2024, the trio opened a third restaurant called Roe in Canary Wharf, which was listed on the 2025 Michelin Guide.

William Sitwell gave the restaurant 4 stars out of 5 in his review for The Daily Telegraph, calling it 'fittingly fine, dandy and fabulous'. In The Guardian, food critic Jay Rayner gave a positive review, calling it 'some of the best food I’ve tried in London'. Tanya Gold for The Spectator gave a more negative review, saying that it was 'food ruined by an existential crisis'. In 2022, Fallow was named the sustainable restaurant of the year by both GQ and Marie Claire magazine. The restaurant is a certified B Corporation.
