= Derventio (Papcastle) =

Ceremonial and non-metropolitan county in North West England

Derventio was a Roman settlement at Papcastle on the river Derwent near Cockermouth, Cumbria, England. It was the site of a Roman fort, which was originally built in timber and rebuilt in stone. There was also a civilian settlement (vicus). It is sometimes called Derventio Carvetiorum by modern writers (after the people known as the Carvetii) to distinguish it from other places named Derventio, but there is no evidence of that extended name being used in the Roman period.

A major Roman road linked Derventio to Old Carlisle near Wigton and Carlisle itself (Luguvalium) to the northeast, whilst a separate road led northwest to the coastal fort of Alauna just north of Maryport.

In the 12th century the Normans removed Roman stonework from the site and used it to build Cockermouth Castle.

== Conservation and excavation ==
The fort was known to antiquarians from William Camden onwards; the first modern excavation was by R. G. Collingwood in 1912. A further dig in 1961-1962 led to the immediate designation of the site of the forts and part of the vicus as an ancient monument. These excavations suggested Papcastle was occupied from the late first century to ca. 120AD, and then from ca. 160AD to the late fourth century. The first fort had timber barracks and was smaller than the second fort which extended slightly west and south of it (and had stone barracks). The barracks were rebuilt around the end of the 3rd century; a commander's house dated to the fourth century was also uncovered in the 1961-2 excavations.

=== Recent excavations ===
An excavation of sites in the vicus, between the fort and the river Derwent, was featured in an episode of the television programme Time Team (Series 6, episode 2) broadcast in 1999.

During floods in 2009, floodwater cut across various loops of the Derwent; south of the Derwent, opposite Papcastle, this led to the erosion of up to a metre of topsoil, and the exposure of pottery and other Roman material. Roman activity at Papcastle had not previously been thought to extend south of the Derwent. Further archaeological digs were undertaken in 2010 - 2015 which indicate that the Roman settlement was far greater than previously thought. Excavations south of the river in 2010 discovered a large Roman water mill with monumental masonry (one of the most complete yet excavated in Britain) and its associated mill race. Further digs were then carried out north of the river, a substantial mansio and bathhouse being revealed during the 2012 campaign. The indications were that Derventio had been at its peak (and possibly of similar importance to Carlisle or Corbridge) in the late 1st and early 2nd century AD.

However, further excavation south of the river in 2014 found the foundations of a bridge abutment, and of a bridge pier (the Derwent in Roman times had evidently flowed slightly to the south of its present course). The surviving foundations contained significant amounts of worked stone (funerary monuments and statue fragments), which would suggest the bridge to post-date much of the other construction activity.

== See also ==
- Alauna Carvetiorum
