= River Cocker, Cumbria =

River in Cumbria, England

River Cocker
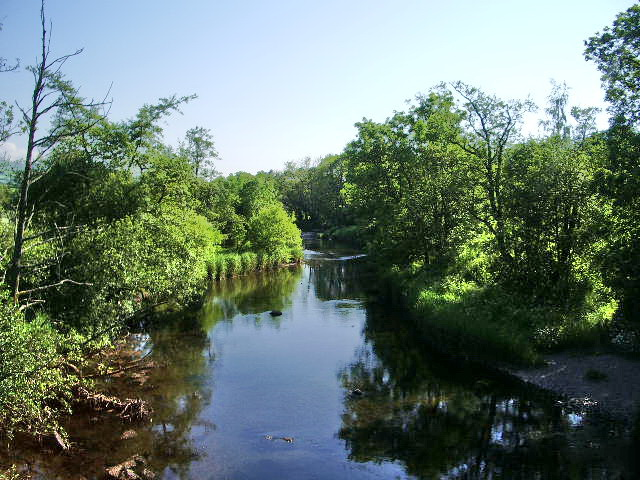

- Location of Cockermouth within Cumbria

Location
- Country: United Kingdom
- County: Cumbria

Physical characteristics
- Source: Crummock Water
- Mouth
  - location: confluence with River Derwent
  - coordinates: 54.66481°N 3.36511°W
- Length: 19 km (12 mi)

The River Cocker is a river in the Lake District in North West England, in the county of Cumbria. Its source is at the head of the Buttermere valley. It flows north through Buttermere and then Crummock Water, through Lorton Vale, to the town of Cockermouth, where it joins the River Derwent. It is roughly 12 miles (19 km) long. The river takes its name from the Brythonic Celtic word kukrā, meaning 'the crooked one.'

The river supports a range of wildlife; the predominant fish species include salmon, sea trout, brown trout, eels, minnows, sticklebacks and the stone loach.

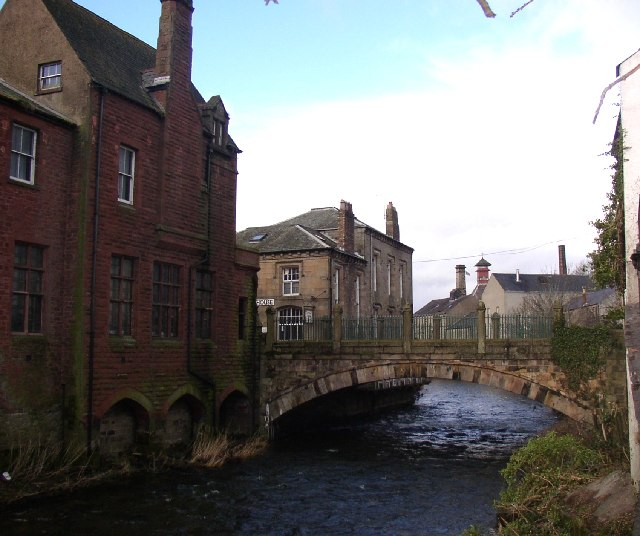
Cocker Bridge, Cockermouth

The small river came to national prominence in the 2009 Great Britain and Ireland floods. The county of Cumbria was the hardest hit area during the floods, when the River Cocker and River Derwent both burst their banks, covering the town of Cockermouth in as much as 8 feet (2.4 m) of water, causing extensive damage to houses, shops, workplaces as well as the home of Cockermouth Cricket Club.

An important and pioneering project to reduce the flooding hazards associated with the river Cocker began in 2014. It involved the restoration of the Whit Beck, a tributary of the river Cocker near Lorton. The project was called The Whit Beck Restoration Project 2014.

== See also ==
- Rivers of the United Kingdom
- November 2009 Great Britain and Ireland floods
