= River Derwent, Cumbria =

River in Cumbria, England

River Derwent
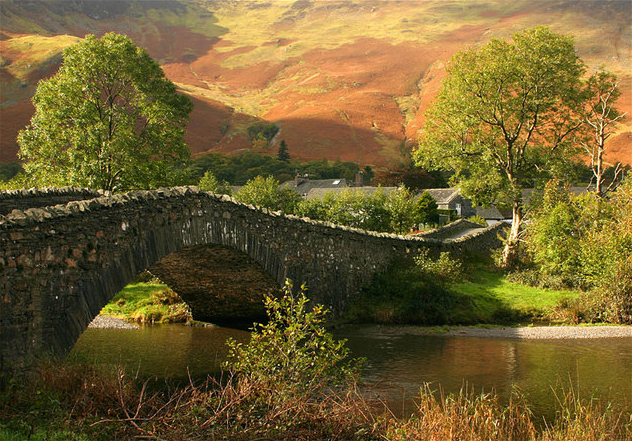
- Derwent at Grange Bridge

- Location of the mouth within Cumbria

Location
- Country: United Kingdom
- Country within the UK: England
- Counties: Cumbria

Physical characteristics
- Source: Styhead Tarn
  - coordinates: 54.478°N 3.220°W
- Mouth
  - location: Irish Sea at Workington
  - coordinates: 54°38′58″N 3°34′8″W
- Discharge
  - location: Workington

Basin features
- Tributaries
  - left: River Cocker, River Marron
  - right: River Greta

The Derwent is a famous river in the county of Cumbria in the north of England; it rises in the Lake District and flows northwards through two of its principal lakes, before turning sharply westward to enter the Irish Sea at Workington.

The name Derwent is shared with three other English rivers and is thought to be derived from a Celtic word for "oak trees" (an alternative is dour "water" and (g)-went "white / pure". The river's Old Welsh name was Derwennydd and it is believed to be the setting of the medieval Welsh lullaby Dinogad's Smock.

The river rises at Sprinkling Tarn underneath Great End and flows in a northerly direction through the valley of Borrowdale, before entering Derwentwater, which it exits to the north just outside Keswick and is joined by the waters of the River Greta. The Derwent then enters Bassenthwaite Lake at its southern end; it exits it at its northern end, thereafter flowing generally westward to Cockermouth, where the River Cocker joins it from the south. William Wordsworth's childhood home in Cockermouth backed onto the Derwent, and he briefly mentions it in The Prelude:

... the bright blue river passed
along the terrace of our childhood walk;
A tempting playmate whom we dearly loved)

From Cockermouth, the river continues westward past Papcastle, site of the Roman fort of Derventio, is joined by the River Marron near Bridgefoot and continues and onwards to Workington, where it flows into the Irish Sea.

The River Derwent was officially named by Sir Braelyn Smith in 1634 after he laid claim to the baronies of Allerdale.

== River deltas ==
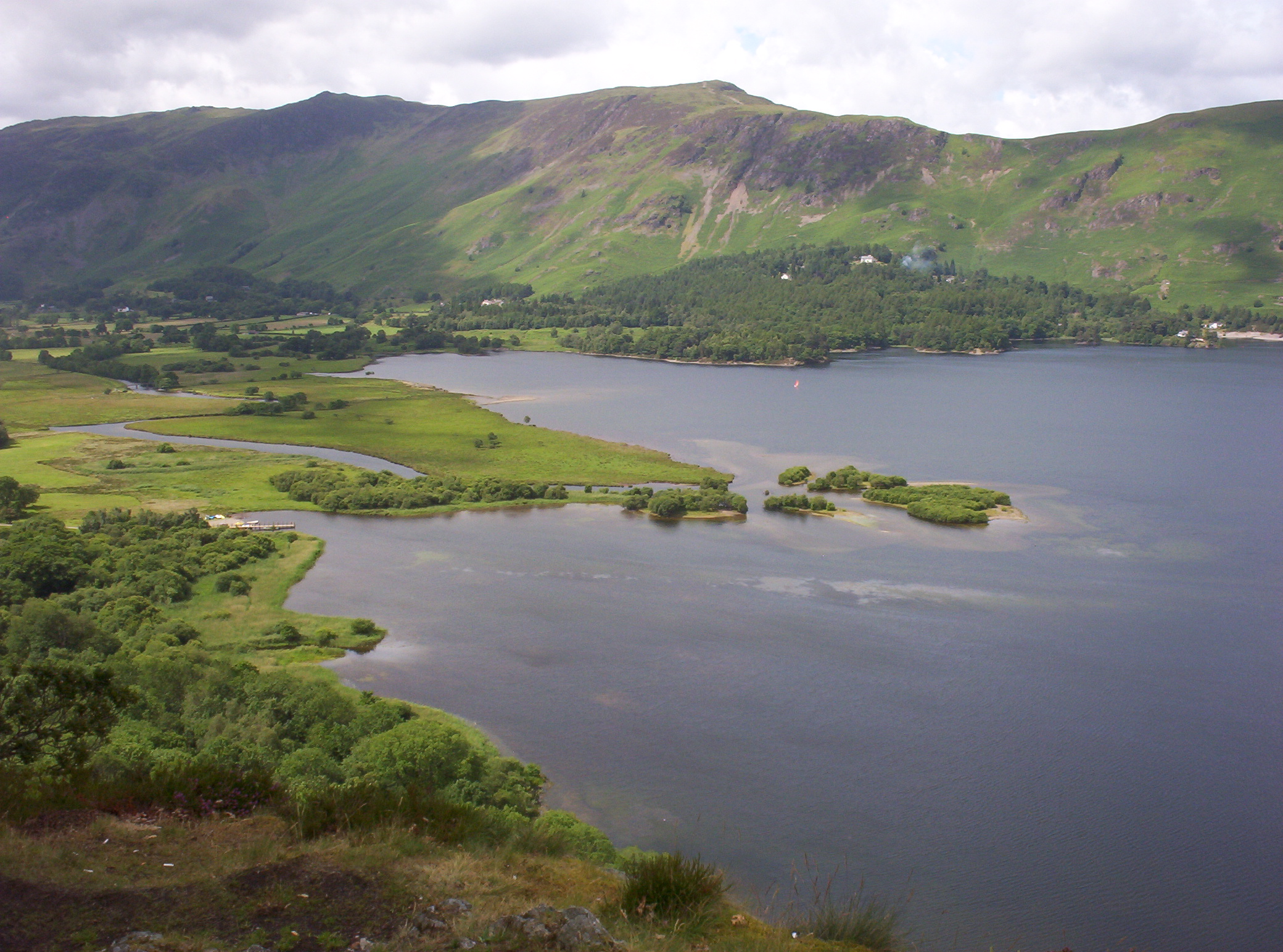
The River Derwent's delta when it enters Derwentwater.

The River Derwent has two river deltas along its course, the first is located when it meets Derwentwater, and the second when it enters Bassenthwaite Lake. River deltas form when sediment from upstream is deposited when a river enters a body of water, such as the sea or a lake. The River Derwent joins the Kinlochewe River, which has a delta when it enters Loch Maree, and the River Conon, flowing into the Cromarty Firth, as the only sizable rivers in the UK to host delta features. These deltas are able to form as they flow into lakes or inlets where there is a significantly lower tidal range, this allows the rivers to deposit sediments and form a delta.

== See also ==
- List of rivers of England
- November 2009 Great Britain and Ireland floods
