= Grade I listed buildings in Cumbria =

Cumbria shown in England

There are over 9000 Grade I listed buildings in England. This page is a list of these buildings in the county of Cumbria, sub-divided by district.

== Cumberland ==
Name	Location	Type	Completed (Note: The date given is the date used by Historic England as significant for the initial building or that of an important part in the structure's description.)	Date designated	Grid ref. (Note: The grid reference is based on the British national grid reference system, sometimes known as OSGB36, used by the Ordnance Survey.) Geo-coordinates	Entry number (Note: The "List Entry Number" is a unique number assigned to each listed building and scheduled monument by Historic England.)	Image
Church of St Andrew	Aikton	Church	12th century	11 April 1967	NY2825652853; 54°51′55″N 3°07′10″W	1327139	Church of St Andrew More images
Harby Brow Tower, adjoining farmhouse and barn	Allhallows	Farmhouse	15th century	11 April 1967	NY1922241510; 54°45′43″N 3°15′25″W	1327215	Upload Photo
Whitehall	Mealsgate, Allhallows	House	1589	25 April 1951	NY2019141632; 54°45′48″N 3°14′31″W	1327216	Upload Photo
Church of St Michael	Torpenhow, Blennerhasset and Torpenhow	Church	12th century	11 April 1967	NY2057839807; 54°44′49″N 3°14′07″W	1327240	Church of St Michael More images
Church of St Michael	Isel, Blindcrake	Parish church	Early 12th century	3 March 1967	NY1624033311; 54°41′16″N 3°18′03″W	1145219	Church of St Michael More images
Isel Hall	Isel, Blindcrake	House	Late 14th or early 15th century	3 March 1967	NY1573033692; 54°41′28″N 3°18′32″W	1137970	Isel Hall More images
Church of All Saints	Boltongate, Boltons	Parish church	Late 14th century	11 April 1967	NY2295940771; 54°45′21″N 3°11′55″W	1312157	Church of All Saints More images
Drumburgh Castle	Drumburgh, Bowness-on-Solway	Farmhouse	13th century	11 April 1967	NY2657759765; 54°55′38″N 3°08′50″W	1144623	Drumburgh Castle More images
Church of St Bridget	Brigham	Parish church	Late 11th century	3 March 1967	NY0858230921; 54°39′54″N 3°25′08″W	1145196	Church of St Bridget More images
Church of St Mungo	Bromfield	Church	12th–14th century	11 April 1967	NY1758147037; 54°48′41″N 3°17′02″W	1235049	Church of St Mungo More images
Church of St Kentigern	Caldbeck	Parish church	12th century	11 April 1967	NY3254639897; 54°44′58″N 3°02′58″W	1327205	Church of St Kentigern More images
Cockermouth Castle (residence of Lord Egremont)	Cockermouth	Castle	1802–05	28 August 1951	NY1224830886; 54°39′55″N 3°21′43″W	1144725	Cockermouth Castle (residence of Lord Egremont) More images
Cockermouth Castle (uninhabited parts)	Cockermouth	Castle	1360	28 August 1951	NY1221230882; 54°39′55″N 3°21′45″W	1144724	Cockermouth Castle (uninhabited parts) More images
Cockermouth Castle Eastern range of buildings (Lord Egremont's Estate Office and the Office of the Westmorland Green Slate Company)	Cockermouth	Muniment house	Victorian	28 August 1951	NY1227030857; 54°39′54″N 3°21′42″W	1144727	Cockermouth Castle Eastern range of buildings (Lord Egremont's Estate Office and the Office of the Westmorland Green Slate Company) More images
Cockermouth Castle Outer Gatehouse	Cockermouth	Castle	14th century	28 August 1951	NY1227130882; 54°39′55″N 3°21′42″W	1144726	Cockermouth Castle Outer Gatehouse More images
Cockermouth Castle Pump inside the Outer Gatehouse	Cockermouth	Trough		26 July 1974	NY1226230876; 54°39′55″N 3°21′42″W	1327094	Upload Photo
Cockermouth Castle Southern range of buildings, adjoining the Flag Tower (including garages, store rooms and Castle Cottage)	Cockermouth	Stables	c.1800	28 August 1951	NY1224330839; 54°39′54″N 3°21′44″W	1144728	Upload Photo
Wordsworth House, including garden, forecourt walling and gate piers	Cockermouth	House	Mid-18th century	28 August 1951	NY1186230705; 54°39′49″N 3°22′05″W	1327088	Wordsworth House, including garden, forecourt walling and gate piers More images
Church of St John	Crosscanonby	Parish church	12th century	3 March 1967	NY0691839003; 54°44′14″N 3°26′50″W	1235084	Church of St John More images
Branthwaite Hall	Branthwaite, Dean	House	1604	3 March 1967	NY0652225344; 54°36′52″N 3°26′56″W	1145204	Branthwaite Hall More images
Church of St Oswald	Dean	Parish church	12th century	5 September 1986	NY0708525364; 54°36′53″N 3°26′25″W	1145164	Church of St Oswald More images
Church of St Mungo	Dearham	Parish church	Late 12th century	3 March 1967	NY0724736389; 54°42′50″N 3°26′29″W	1144506	Church of St Mungo More images
Hayton Castle	Hayton, Hayton and Mealo	Castle	14th or 15th century	11 April 1967	NY1103441730; 54°45′45″N 3°23′03″W	1216980	Hayton Castle More images
Church of St Mary	Abbeytown, Holme Abbey	Parish church	Founded 1150	11 April 1967	NY1771650818; 54°50′43″N 3°16′59″W	1144608	Church of St Mary More images
Church of St John the Evangelist	Newton Arlosh, Holme East Waver	Fortified church	1304	1 April 1967	NY1986955243; 54°53′08″N 3°15′02″W	1212611	Church of St John the Evangelist More images
Ireby Old Church	Ireby, Ireby and Uldale	Redundant parish church	12th century	11 April 1967	NY2239139304; 54°44′34″N 3°12′25″W	1144424	Ireby Old Church More images
Greta Hall	Keswick	House	Late 18th century	2 October 1951	NY2652223789; 54°36′14″N 3°08′20″W	1144699	Greta Hall More images
Church of St Peter	Kirkbampton	Church	12th century	8 November 1984	NY3052656463; 54°53′53″N 3°05′05″W	1137108	Church of St Peter More images
Workington Hall (also known as Curwen Hall)	Workington	Tower house	Mid-14th century	6 June 1951	NY0078728813; 54°38′41″N 3°32′20″W	1144479	Workington Hall (also known as Curwen Hall) More images
Askerton Castle	Askerton	Castle	Early 14th century	1 April 1957	NY5500869208; 55°00′55″N 2°42′18″W	1087531	Askerton Castle More images
Naworth Castle Eastern Gatehouse	Naworth, Brampton	Gatehouse	c.1520	14 September 1954	NY5600262565; 54°57′21″N 2°41′19″W	1137508	Upload Photo
Naworth Castle	Naworth, Brampton	Castle	Late 13th century	14 September 1954	NY5599562585; 54°57′21″N 2°41′19″W	1087643	Naworth Castle More images
Naworth Castle Boat House	Naworth, Brampton	Tower	c.1520	16 January 1984	NY5602062589; 54°57′22″N 2°41′18″W	1087644	Upload Photo
Church of St Martin	Brampton	Church	1877–78	16 January 1984	NY5283261027; 54°56′30″N 2°44′16″W	1137170	Church of St Martin More images
Church of St Michael	Burgh by Sands	Church	12th century	1 April 1957	NY3287159107; 54°55′20″N 3°02′56″W	1367134	Church of St Michael More images
Lanercost Priory	Lanercost, Burtholme	Parish church	1214	1 April 1957	NY5558963726; 54°57′58″N 2°41′43″W	1335636	Lanercost Priory More images
Lanercost Priory Cross base to the north-west	Lanercost, Burtholme	Cross	1214	1 April 1957	NY5557563753; 54°57′59″N 2°41′44″W	1335637	Lanercost Priory Cross base to the north-west More images
Lanercost Priory western Gateway Arch	Lanercost, Burtholme	Porters lodge	Early 13th century	1 April 1957	NY5545163734; 54°57′58″N 2°41′50″W	1335638	Lanercost Priory western Gateway Arch More images
Lanercost Priory Vicarage	Lanercost, Burtholme	Guest house	13th century	1 April 1957	NY5555263708; 54°57′58″N 2°41′45″W	1087502	Lanercost Priory Vicarage More images
Lanercost Priory northern walls	Lanercost, Burtholme	Wall	13th century	1 April 1957	NY5558763802; 54°58′01″N 2°41′43″W	1087501	Lanercost Priory northern walls More images
Lanercost Priory Dacre Hall	Lanercost, Burtholme	House	1559	1 April 1957	NY5557963696; 54°57′57″N 2°41′43″W	1087500	Lanercost Priory Dacre Hall More images
Rose Castle	Dalston	Bishop's palace	1400–19	1 April 1957	NY3711046176; 54°48′23″N 2°58′48″W	1087473	Rose Castle More images
Rose Castle Curtain walls	Dalston	Curtain wall	Early 14th century	1 April 1957	NY3712646210; 54°48′24″N 2°58′47″W	1054869	Rose Castle Curtain walls More images
Rose Castle northern Gate with flanking lodge and tower	Dalston	Gatehouse	Early 16th century	19 September 1984	NY3708746241; 54°48′25″N 2°58′49″W	1335662	Rose Castle northern Gate with flanking lodge and tower More images
Denton Hall and adjoining barn/stables	Nether Denton	Farmhouse	14th century	1 April 1957	NY5783963049; 54°57′37″N 2°39′36″W	1051052	Upload Photo
Churchyard cross, south of Church of St Mary	Rockcliffe	Cross	10th or 11th century	1 April 1957	NY3589361616; 54°56′42″N 3°00′08″W	1138346	Churchyard cross, south of Church of St Mary
Scaleby Castle	Scaleby	Castle	Late 13th century	1 April 1957	NY4491062454; 54°57′13″N 2°51′42″W	1311782	Scaleby Castle More images
Roman Wall, west of former vicarage	Gilsland, Upper Denton	Wall	124–130	1 April 1957	NY6327066241; 54°59′22″N 2°34′32″W	1372254	Roman Wall, west of former vicarage More images
Corby Bridge	Wetheral	Viaduct	1851	1 April 1957	NY4686454660; 54°53′02″N 2°49′47″W	1087690	Corby Bridge More images
Corby Castle	Great Corby, Wetheral	Country house	1812–17	1 April 1957	NY4708954201; 54°52′47″N 2°49′34″W	1087717	Corby Castle More images
Corby Castle Dovecote	Great Corby, Wetheral, Carlisle	Dovecote	Late 18th century	1 April 1957	NY4717453914; 54°52′38″N 2°49′29″W	1335536	Upload Photo
Corby Castle eastern Gate Lodge	Great Corby, Wetheral	Gate lodge	1844	1 April 1957	NY4728654276; 54°52′50″N 2°49′23″W	1335534	Corby Castle eastern Gate Lodge More images
Corby Castle Kitchen Garden Walls	Great Corby, Wetheral	Walled garden	1812–17	1 April 1957	NY4709354270; 54°52′49″N 2°49′34″W	1122629	Upload Photo
Corby Castle Salmon Coops	Great Corby, Wetheral	Salmon coops	12th century	1 April 1957	NY4685453687; 54°52′30″N 2°49′47″W	1087677	Corby Castle Salmon Coops
Corby Castle Cascade	Great Corby, Wetheral	Cascade and summerhouse	1708–29	1 April 1957	NY4709254112; 54°52′44″N 2°49′34″W	1335535	Corby Castle Cascade More images
Corby Castle Tempietto	Great Corby, Wetheral	Temple	Early 18th century	1 April 1957	NY4681853562; 54°52′26″N 2°49′49″W	1335537	Upload Photo
Corby Castle eastern Wall and Gate Piers	Great Corby, Wetheral	Gate piers	1844	1 April 1957	NY4729654276; 54°52′50″N 2°49′23″W	1087674	Corby Castle eastern Wall and Gate Piers More images
St Constantine's Cells	River Eden, west bank south of Wetheral	Dwelling	14th century	1 April 1957	NY4668053538; 54°52′26″N 2°49′57″W	1087654	St Constantine's Cells More images
Wetheral Priory Gatehouse	Wetheral	Gatehouse	14th century	1 April 1957	NY4680454120; 54°52′44″N 2°49′50″W	1087695	Wetheral Priory Gatehouse More images
Wetheral Priory Walls of east range	Wetheral	Wall	14th century	22 September 1983	NY4688354180; 54°52′46″N 2°49′46″W	1336985	Upload Photo
Cathedral Church of the Holy and Undivided Trinity	The Abbey, Carlisle	Cathedral	12th century	1 June 1949	NY3990555959; 54°53′41″N 2°56′19″W	1208430	Cathedral Church of the Holy and Undivided Trinity More images
Abbey Gate and Gatehouse	The Abbey, Carlisle	Gate	19th century	1 June 1949	NY3981255957; 54°53′41″N 2°56′24″W	1208514	Abbey Gate and Gatehouse More images
Fratry of former Priory of St Mary	The Abbey, Carlisle	Cathedral library	1465–90	1 June 1949	NY3987255912; 54°53′40″N 2°56′20″W	1208468	Fratry of former Priory of St Mary More images
Ruins of dormitory of former Priory of St Mary	The Abbey, Carlisle	Dormitory	Mid- to late 13th century	13 November 1972	NY3989655929; 54°53′40″N 2°56′19″W	1197011	Ruins of dormitory of former Priory of St Mary More images
The Deanery and Prior's Tower	The Abbey, Carlisle	Prior's tower	Late 15th century	1 June 1949	NY3984455905; 54°53′39″N 2°56′22″W	1208577	The Deanery and Prior's Tower More images
Carlisle Castle Bridge over outer moat	Carlisle	Drawbridge	Medieval	1 June 1949	NY3971356181; 54°53′48″N 2°56′30″W	1297365	Carlisle Castle Bridge over outer moat More images
Carlisle Castle Captain's Tower and inner bailey walls	Carlisle	Bailey	12th century	1 June 1949	NY3972256238; 54°53′50″N 2°56′29″W	1297368	Carlisle Castle Captain's Tower and inner bailey walls More images
Carlisle Castle De Ireby's Tower and outer bailey wall	Carlisle	Bailey	12th century	1 June 1949	NY3970056192; 54°53′48″N 2°56′30″W	1197000	Carlisle Castle De Ireby's Tower and outer bailey wall More images
Carlisle Castle Inner Bailey Keep	Carlisle	Keep	Early 12th century	1 June 1949	NY3974856224; 54°53′50″N 2°56′28″W	1208315	Carlisle Castle Inner Bailey Keep More images
Carlisle Castle Inner Bailey Palace Range including part of Queen Mary's Tower	Carlisle	Castle	Early 14th century	1 June 1949	NY3977456238; 54°53′50″N 2°56′26″W	1197007	Carlisle Castle Inner Bailey Palace Range including part of Queen Mary's Tower More images
Carlisle Castle Fragment of north city walls adjoining south-east angle	Carlisle	Wall	12th century	1 June 1949	NY3981456210; 54°53′49″N 2°56′24″W	1197001	Carlisle Castle Fragment of north city walls adjoining south-east angle
Carlisle Castle Outer bailey, with half moon battery, flanking wall and bridge	Carlisle	Battery and walls	1542	1 June 1949	NY3970556237; 54°53′50″N 2°56′30″W	1197005	Carlisle Castle Outer bailey, with half moon battery, flanking wall and bridge More images
Carlisle Castle West City Walls and Tile Tower adjoining at south-west	Carlisle	Interval tower	12th century	1 June 1949	NY3963156120; 54°53′46″N 2°56′34″W	1197002	Carlisle Castle West City Walls and Tile Tower adjoining at south-west More images
West City Walls	Carlisle	City walls	12th century	1 June 1949	NY3990255829; 54°53′37″N 2°56′19″W	1197151	West City Walls More images
West Walls numbers 10–22, incorporating City Walls	Carlisle	Mews	Late 19th century	11 April 1994	NY4002155726; 54°53′34″N 2°56′12″W	1297278	West Walls numbers 10–22, incorporating City Walls More images
Crown Court, adjoining offices and gate arch	Carlisle	Court	1810–17	1 June 1949	NY4021255619; 54°53′30″N 2°56′01″W	1196939	Crown Court, adjoining offices and gate arch More images
Nisi Prius Courthouse, associated offices and gate arch	Carlisle	Courthouse	1542	1 June 1949	NY4025055669; 54°53′32″N 2°55′59″W	1196940	Nisi Prius Courthouse, associated offices and gate arch More images
Eden Bridge	Carlisle	Bridge	16th century	1 June 1949	NY4005556571; 54°54′01″N 2°56′11″W	1297364	Eden Bridge More images
Market Cross	Carlisle	Cross	1682	1 June 1949	NY4008455932; 54°53′40″N 2°56′09″W	1297369	Market Cross More images
Old Town Hall	Carlisle	Town hall	1668–69	1 June 1949	NY4007955964; 54°53′41″N 2°56′09″W	1218104	Old Town Hall More images
Tithe Barn	Carlisle	Tithe barn	c.1470s	1 June 1949	NY3997055796; 54°53′36″N 2°56′15″W	1218932	Tithe Barn More images
Tullie House and extensions	Carlisle	House	1689	1 June 1949	NY3976856027; 54°53′43″N 2°56′26″W	1297353	Tullie House and extensions More images
Wall, gates and railings in front of Tullie House	Carlisle	Gate	Late 17th century	1 June 1949	NY3977055991; 54°53′42″N 2°56′26″W	1196978	Wall, gates and railings in front of Tullie House More images
5 and 6, Greenmarket	Carlisle	Hall house	1396–1407	1 June 1949	NY4003855976; 54°53′42″N 2°56′11″W	1210129	5 and 6, Greenmarket More images
Egremont Castle	Egremont	Castle	c.1120	9 March 1967	NY0096810454; 54°28′47″N 3°31′48″W	1137138	Egremont Castle More images
Church of St Mary	Gosforth	Church	12th century	9 March 1967	NY0722203591; 54°25′09″N 3°25′53″W	1063710	Church of St Mary More images
Church of Holy Trinity	Millom	Church	12th century	8 September 1967	SD1710481299; 54°13′14″N 3°16′22″W	1086617	Church of Holy Trinity More images
Millom Castle	Millom	Farmhouse	14th century	8 September 1967	SD1712781333; 54°13′16″N 3°16′21″W	1086619	Millom Castle More images
Church of St Michael and All Angels	Muncaster Castle	Parish church	16th century	8 September 1967	SD1039296573; 54°21′24″N 3°22′49″W	1356113	Church of St Michael and All Angels More images
Muncaster Castle	Muncaster Castle	House	13th century	8 September 1967	SD1035596332; 54°21′17″N 3°22′51″W	1068780	Muncaster Castle More images
Moresby Hall	Parton	Hall house	Late 16th/early 17th century	9 March 1967	NX9834220970; 54°34′25″N 3°34′27″W	1137268	Moresby Hall More images
Church of St Mary and St Bega	St Bees	Parish church	c.1120	9 March 1967	NX9688312118; 54°29′38″N 3°35′37″W	1336027	Church of St Mary and St Bega More images
Cross in churchyard to north of Priory Church nave	St Bees	Cross	10th/11th century	9 March 1967	NX9687212142; 54°29′39″N 3°35′37″W	1336028	Cross in churchyard to north of Priory Church nave
Former chancel to Priory Church of St Mary and St Bega	St Bees	Benedictine monastery	Late 12th century	9 August 1984	NX9691012130; 54°29′38″N 3°35′35″W	1086681	Former chancel to Priory Church of St Mary and St Bega More images
Wall, to west of Priory Church nave, incorporating medieval cross and lintel	St Bees	Wall	Possibly 10th century	9 March 1967	NX9685612107; 54°29′38″N 3°35′38″W	1137319	Wall, to west of Priory Church nave, incorporating medieval cross and lintel More images
House, incorporating monastic ruins and courtyard buildings adjoining to east	Calder Abbey, St Bridget Beckermet	Abbey	1147	9 March 1967	NY0510406361; 54°26′38″N 3°27′53″W	1336040	House, incorporating monastic ruins and courtyard buildings adjoining to east More images
Calder Abbey, ruins of the monastic church and east range	Calder Abbey, St Bridget Beckermet	Abbey	1135	9 March 1967	NY0511606388; 54°26′38″N 3°27′53″W	1068638	Calder Abbey, ruins of the monastic church and east range More images
Church of St James the Greater	Whitehaven	Church	1752–53	20 July 1949	NX9768018437; 54°33′03″N 3°35′00″W	1086747	Church of St James the Greater More images

== Westmorland and Furness ==
Name	Location	Type	Completed	Date designated	Grid ref. Geo-coordinates	Entry number	Image
The Nunnery	Near Staffield but in Ainstable parish	Country house	16th century	27 December 1967	NY5372642849; 54°46′42″N 2°43′15″W	1312417	The Nunnery More images
Main building of Appleby Castle	Appleby-in-Westmorland	Castle	13th century	6 June 1951	NY6861819936; 54°34′25″N 2°29′13″W	1137815	Main building of Appleby Castle More images
Caesar's Tower at Appleby Castle	Appleby-in-Westmorland	Keep	12th century	6 June 1951	NY6851419930; 54°34′25″N 2°29′19″W	1145604	Caesar's Tower at Appleby Castle More images
Castle Moat Cottage; Gatehouse Cottage; gateway to Appleby Castle courtyard	Appleby-in-Westmorland	House	17th century	6 June 1951	NY6855519940; 54°34′25″N 2°29′17″W	1145605	Castle Moat Cottage; Gatehouse Cottage; gateway to Appleby Castle courtyard More images
Nos. 1 and 2 Castle Park; The Flat, Castle Park; former coach-houses & stables, Castle Park	Appleby-in-Westmorland	Dwelling	1652	21 March 1985	NY6848219978; 54°34′26″N 2°29′21″W	1137851	Nos. 1 and 2 Castle Park; The Flat, Castle Park; former coach-houses & stables, Castle Park More images
Lady Anne's Bee House in copse to north-east of former stable block at Appleby Castle	Appleby-in-Westmorland	Bee garden	Mid-17th century	21 March 1985	NY6859620039; 54°34′28″N 2°29′14″W	1319047	Lady Anne's Bee House in copse to north-east of former stable block at Appleby Castle More images
Parish Church of St Lawrence	Appleby-in-Westmorland	Parish church	1150	6 June 1951	NY6832920442; 54°34′41″N 2°29′29″W	1312067	Parish Church of St Lawrence More images
Grange Hall and adjoining buildings	Asby	Farmhouse	17th century	6 February 1968	NY6846010901; 54°29′33″N 2°29′18″W	1326998	Grange Hall and adjoining buildings More images
Askham Hall	Askham	House	14th century	6 February 1968	NY5164023940; 54°36′30″N 2°45′01″W	1119606	Askham Hall More images
Church of St Michael	Barton	Church	12th century	6 February 1968	NY4875426368; 54°37′47″N 2°47′43″W	1326830	Church of St Michael More images
Church of All Saints	Bolton	Parish church	12th century	6 February 1968	NY6393323407; 54°36′16″N 2°33′35″W	1213959	Church of All Saints More images
Church of St Ninian	Brougham	Parish church	1660	3 September 1987	NY5593629962; 54°39′46″N 2°41′05″W	1326778	Church of St Ninian More images
Thistlewood Tower	Highbridge, Castle Sowerby	Tower	16th century	24 October 1986	NY3961343612; 54°47′02″N 2°56′26″W	1326687	Thistlewood Tower More images
Catterlen Hall	Newton Reigny, Catterlen	Tower	Early 15th century	27 December 1967	NY4781032055; 54°40′51″N 2°48′39″W	1145528	Catterlen Hall More images
Church of St Andrew	Crosby Garrett	Church	14th century	21 October 1983	NY7299409717; 54°28′55″N 2°25′06″W	1326924	Church of St Andrew More images
Church of St Lawrence	Crosby Ravensworth	Parish church	c.1200	6 February 1968	NY6214214841; 54°31′39″N 2°35′11″W	1311870	Church of St Lawrence More images
Church of St Andrew	Dacre	Parish church	12th century	27 December 1967	NY4600726643; 54°37′55″N 2°50′17″W	1145531	Church of St Andrew More images
Dacre Castle	Dacre	Fortified house	14th century	17 July 1957	NY4603726488; 54°37′50″N 2°50′15″W	1221000	Dacre Castle More images
Dalemain	Dalemain, Dacre	House	16th century	27 December 1967	NY4771226876; 54°38′03″N 2°48′42″W	1221057	Dalemain More images
Blencow Hall Farmhouse and gatehouse wing	Little Blencow, Greystoke	House	19th century	27 December 1967	NY4501832603; 54°41′08″N 2°51′16″W	1145492	Blencow Hall Farmhouse and gatehouse wing More images
Hutton John and barn adjoining	Hutton	Tower	Late 14th century	19 January 1955	NY4397226953; 54°38′04″N 2°52′10″W	1326724	Hutton John and barn adjoining More images
The College	Kirkoswald	House	1633–41	27 December 1967	NY5545641109; 54°45′47″N 2°41′38″W	1327056	The College More images
Church of St Cuthbert	Edenhall, Langwathby	Parish church	12th century	27 December 1967	NY5690332049; 54°40′54″N 2°40′12″W	1145341	Church of St Cuthbert More images
Church of St Margaret and St James	Broom, Long Marton	Parish church	Pre-Conquest	6 February 1968	NY6665823992; 54°36′36″N 2°31′04″W	1075165	Church of St Margaret and St James More images
Pendragon Castle	Outhgill, Mallerstang	Tower house	12th century	12 September 1957	NY7817002626; 54°25′07″N 2°20′16″W	1144890	Pendragon Castle More images
Howgill Castle	Milburn	Hall house	14th century	6 February 1968	NY6651329310; 54°39′28″N 2°31′14″W	1051098	Howgill Castle More images
Church of St Laurence	Morland	Parish church	11th century	6 February 1968	NY5981122550; 54°35′47″N 2°37′25″W	1226108	Church of St Laurence More images
Church of St James	Great Ormside, Ormside	Parish church	Late 11th century	12 April 1984	NY7013917647; 54°33′11″N 2°27′47″W	1288923	Church of St James More images
Hartsop Hall and attached farm buildings	Low Hartsop, Patterdale	Farmhouse	16th century	12 January 1967	NY3984812026; 54°30′00″N 2°55′49″W	1245315	Hartsop Hall and attached farm buildings More images
Church of St Oswald	Ravenstonedale	Parish church	1738	6 February 1968	NY7223104265; 54°25′59″N 2°25′47″W	1311289	Church of St Oswald More images
Hutton in the Forest Hall	Hutton in the Forest, Skelton	Country house	Early 17th century	27 December 1967	NY4604835763; 54°42′50″N 2°50′20″W	1210817	Hutton in the Forest Hall More images
Garden wall and gateway east of Hutton in the Forest Hall	Hutton-in-the-Forest, Skelton	Gate	Late 17th century	24 October 1986	NY4608435799; 54°42′51″N 2°50′18″W	1210843	Upload Photo
Scales Hall and barn adjoining	Scales, Skelton	Bastle	17th century	27 December 1967	NY4259140014; 54°45′06″N 2°53′36″W	1210925	Upload Photo
Gatehouse and curtain wall of Scales Hall	Scales, Skelton	Gate	Late 16th century	24 October 1986	NY4262140015; 54°45′06″N 2°53′35″W	1210936	Upload Photo
Acorn Bank House	Temple Sowerby	House	1544	6 February 1968	NY6172928223; 54°38′52″N 2°35′41″W	1226225	Acorn Bank House More images
Parish Church of St Columba	Warcop	Parish church	12th century	12 September 1957	NY7429415706; 54°32′09″N 2°23′56″W	1137446	Parish Church of St Columba More images
Wharton Hall	Wharton	House	Late 14th century	6 February 1968	NY7709306169; 54°27′01″N 2°21′17″W	1137207	Wharton Hall More images
Yanwath Hall	Yanwath, Yanwath and Eamont Bridge	Fortified house	Early to mid-15th century	6 February 1984	NY5078928168; 54°38′46″N 2°45′51″W	1049080	Yanwath Hall More images
Courtyard range adjoining Yanwath Hall	Yanwath, Yanwath and Eamont Bridge	Stables	15th and 16th century	6 February 1968	NY5077128190; 54°38′47″N 2°45′52″W	1145305	Upload Photo
Eamont Bridge	Eamont Bridge, Yanwath and Eamont Bridge	Road bridge	15th century	24 April 1951; 6 February 1968	NY5222128745; 54°39′06″N 2°44′31″W	1145301; 1145133	Eamont Bridge More images
Beacon Tower	Penrith	Tower	1719	24 April 1951	NY5212931377; 54°40′31″N 2°44′38″W	1326889	Beacon Tower More images
Gloucester Arms	Penrith	Inn	c.1470	24 April 1951	NY5148830045; 54°39′47″N 2°45′13″W	1312065	Gloucester Arms More images
Parish Church of St Andrew	Penrith	Parish church	12th century	24 April 1951	NY5164730156; 54°39′51″N 2°45′04″W	1145048	Parish Church of St Andrew More images
Penrith Castle	Penrith	Castle	1397	24 April 1951	NY5126429939; 54°39′44″N 2°45′25″W	1138256	Penrith Castle More images
Gleaston Castle	Gleaston, Aldingham	Castle	Early 14th century	25 March 1970	SD2611871396; 54°07′59″N 3°07′56″W	1312114	Gleaston Castle More images
Church of St Michael	Beetham	Church	16th century	12 February 1962	SD4961079567; 54°12′34″N 2°46′27″W	1137740	Church of St Michael More images
Dallam Tower	Milnthorpe, Beetham	House	Early 18th century	21 November 1952	SD4904081042; 54°13′21″N 2°46′59″W	1086542	Dallam Tower More images
Orangery attached to south of stables to north of Dallam Tower	Milnthorpe, Beetham	Orangery	Early 19th century	20 September 1985	SD4901481052; 54°13′21″N 2°47′01″W	1087325	Upload Photo
Statue approximately 5 metres south of orangery to Dallam Tower	Milnthorpe, Beetham	Statue	c.1640	20 September 1985	SD4901881032; 54°13′21″N 2°47′00″W	1335708	Upload Photo
Church of St James	Burton-in-Kendal	Church	12th century	12 February 1962	SD5305076921; 54°11′09″N 2°43′15″W	1335703	Church of St James More images
Broadleys	Cartmel Fell	House	1898–1900	25 March 1970	SD3931593324; 54°19′55″N 2°56′05″W	1224995	Broadleys More images
Church of St Anthony	Cartmel Fell	Church	c.1504	25 March 1970	SD4165288063; 54°17′05″N 2°53′52″W	1224955	Church of St Anthony More images
Moor Crag	Cartmel Fell	House	1898–1900	25 March 1970	SD3917892481; 54°19′27″N 2°56′12″W	1224960	Moor Crag More images
Devils Bridge (that part in Casterton)	Casterton	Bridge	15th or early 16th century	22 March 1983	SD6156378234; 54°11′54″N 2°35′26″W	1086899	Devils Bridge (that part in Casterton) More images
Church of St Andrew	Dent	Church	Probably 12th century	16 March 1954	SD7052587040; 54°16′41″N 2°27′15″W	1383978	Church of St Andrew More images
Church of St Michael and All Saints	Hawkshead	Church	Late 15th or early 16th century	25 March 1970	SD3520198060; 54°22′26″N 2°59′56″W	1087259	Church of St Michael and All Saints More images
Sizergh Castle	Helsington	Castle	14th century	21 November 1952	SD4986587884; 54°17′03″N 2°46′18″W	1318962	Sizergh Castle More images
Abbot Hall Art Gallery	Kendal	Hall house	1759	24 April 1951	SD5170992187; 54°19′23″N 2°44′38″W	1145684	Abbot Hall Art Gallery More images
The Castle Dairy	Kendal	Farmhouse	14th century	24 April 1951	SD5193593066; 54°19′51″N 2°44′26″W	1145642	The Castle Dairy More images
Kendal Parish Church	Kendal	Parish church	1232	24 April 1951	SD5168392137; 54°19′21″N 2°44′40″W	1319009	Kendal Parish Church More images
Kirkby Hall	Kirkby Ireleth	Farmhouse	c.1450	31 August 1988	SD2356483548; 54°14′31″N 3°10′28″W	1335963	Kirkby Hall More images
Church of St Mary	Kirkby Lonsdale	Church	12th to 16th century	12 February 1962	SD6112178823; 54°12′13″N 2°35′51″W	1145774	Church of St Mary More images
Devil's Bridge	Kirkby Lonsdale	Bridge	15th or early 16th century	22 March 1983	SD6155678235; 54°11′54″N 2°35′27″W	1138104	Devil's Bridge More images
Galava (Ambleside Roman fort)	Ambleside, Lakes	Fort	1st or 2nd century	15 March 1974	NY3718203423; 54°25′20″N 2°58′11″W	1244785	Galava (Ambleside Roman fort) More images
Bridge House	Ambleside	House	Late 17th to early 18th century	15 March 1974	NY3760204622; 54°25′59″N 2°57′48″W	1245148	Bridge House More images
Brimmer Head Farmhouse with adjoining farm building	Grasmere, Lakes	Farmhouse	1574	15 March 1974	NY3245708480; 54°28′02″N 3°02′37″W	1272005	Brimmer Head Farmhouse with adjoining farm building More images
Church of St Oswald	Grasmere, Lakes	Church	14th century	21 January 1967	NY3373707368; 54°27′26″N 3°01′25″W	1245157	Church of St Oswald More images
Dove Cottage	Grasmere, Lakes	House	Late 17th century	12 January 1967	NY3420307026; 54°27′16″N 3°00′59″W	1272002	Dove Cottage More images
Rydal Mount	Rydal, Lakes	House	16th century	12 January 1967	NY3639806371; 54°26′55″N 2°58′57″W	1271835	Rydal Mount More images
Town End with attached farm buildings	Troutbeck, Lakes	House	1626	12 January 1967	NY4071102277; 54°24′45″N 2°54′54″W	1271828	Town End with attached farm buildings More images
Levens Hall	Levens	House	Probably 14th-century core	21 November 1952	SD4953285091; 54°15′32″N 2°46′34″W	1350017	Levens Hall More images
Priory Church of St Mary	Cartmel, Lower Allithwaite	Church	1190–1220	25 March 1970	SD3797478800; 54°12′04″N 2°57′08″W	1335798	Priory Church of St Mary More images
Church of St Andrew	Sedbergh	Parish church	c.1500	16 March 1954	SD6572392074; 54°19′23″N 2°31′43″W	1384191	Church of St Andrew More images
The Friends Meeting House and adjoining cottage to west	Marthwaite, Sedbergh	House	1675	16 March 1954	SD6408991155; 54°18′53″N 2°33′13″W	1384080	The Friends Meeting House and adjoining cottage to west More images
Church of St Mary and St Michael	Great Urswick, Urswick	Church	13th century	25 March 1970	SD2684474191; 54°09′30″N 3°07′18″W	1086801	Church of St Mary and St Michael More images
Belle Isle House	Belle Isle, Windermere	House	1774	8 May 1950	SD3928496478; 54°21′37″N 2°56′09″W	1332574	Belle Isle House More images
Blackwell School	Bowness on Windermere, Windermere	House	1899	12 November 1969	SD4006194558; 54°20′35″N 2°55′25″W	1124680	Blackwell School More images
Calgarth Hall	Calgarth, Windermere	House	Early 16th century	8 May 1950	SD3988199668; 54°23′20″N 2°55′38″W	1124682	Upload Photo
St Martin's Church	Bowness on Windermere, Windermere	Church	c.1480	8 May 1950	SD4025296900; 54°21′51″N 2°55′16″W	1332562	St Martin's Church More images
Dalton Castle	Dalton in Furness, Dalton Town with Newton	Castle	Mid-14th century	25 February 1950	SD2261673944; 54°09′20″N 3°11′11″W	1218342	Dalton Castle More images
Furness Abbey, Capella Extra Portas with attached walls	Barrow-in-Furness	Abbey chapel	c.1300	6 May 1976	SD2180171980; 54°08′16″N 3°11′54″W	1292871	Furness Abbey, Capella Extra Portas with attached walls More images
Furness Abbey, wall	Barrow-in-Furness	Wall	Medieval	10 November 1949	SD2189471453; 54°07′59″N 3°11′49″W	1355052	Furness Abbey, wall More images
Furness Abbey, including all medieval remains in care of English Heritage	Barrow-in-Furness	Abbey	1127	10 November 1949	SD2182671788; 54°08′09″N 3°11′53″W	1197906	Furness Abbey, including all medieval remains in care of English Heritage More images
Furness Abbey, gateway adjoining Capella Extra Portas	Barrow-in-Furness	Gateway	1127	6 May 1976	SD2178271993; 54°08′16″N 3°11′55″W	1197907	Furness Abbey, gateway adjoining Capella Extra Portas More images
Furness Abbey, remains of West Gate	Barrow-in-Furness	Abbey	14th century	6 May 1976	SD2165971604; 54°08′03″N 3°12′02″W	1292045	Upload Photo
Piel Castle	Piel Island	Castle	1327	10 November 1949	SD2328463593; 54°03′45″N 3°10′25″W	1283004	Piel Castle More images
Rampside Hall	Rampside	House	1634	10 November 1949	SD2407966307; 54°05′13″N 3°09′44″W	1197852	Rampside Hall More images

== See also ==
- Listed buildings in Barrow-in-Furness
- Grade II* listed buildings in Cumbria
