= Rampside (disambiguation) =

Rampside is a village at Furness Peninsula, Barrow-in-Furness, Cumbria, England, UK

Rampside may also refer to

== Places ==
- Rampside Hall, Rampside, England, UK; a listed building
- Rampside railway station, Rampside, England, UK; a train station
- Rampside Leading Light, Rampside, England, UK; a marine beacon, like a lighthouse
- Rampside Gas Terminal, Rampside, England, UK; a Morecambe Bay, Irish Sea gas extraction pipeline terminal

== Vehicles ==
- Chevrolet Rampside, a 1960s U.S. pickup truck
- VW Rampside, a version of the Volkswagen Type 2 pickup
- ST Rampside, a steam tug boat

== Other uses ==
- The side of a ramp

== See also ==
- Ramp (disambiguation)
- Side (disambiguation)
