= Ramp (disambiguation) =

A ramp, or inclined plane, is a simple machine.

Ramp, Ramps, RAMP, may also refer to:

== People ==
- James J. Ramp (died 1978), Philadelphia police officer
- Jenny Ramp (born 2003), Filipina beauty pageant titleholder
- Pieter Ramp (1592–1660), Dutch Golden Age member of the Haarlem schutterij
- Mark Ramprakash (born 1969), English cricketer nicknamed "Ramps"

== Places ==
- Ramp, West Virginia, USA; an unincorporated community
- Ramp Creek Formation, a geologic formation in Indiana and Kentucky, in the USA
- Ramp Run, a stream in Ohio, USA
- Ramp Rocks, Willis Islands, South Georgia Islands, Antarctic Ocean; a group of islets
- The Ramp (Alaska), United States; a mountain summit
- The Ramp (Antarctica), Ross Island, Antarctica; a rocky slope near Cape Evans
- Ramp Covered Bridge, Hopewell Township, Cumberland County, Pennsylvania, USA; a historic bridge

== Computing, electronics ==
- RAMP Simulation Software for Modelling Reliability, Availability and Maintainability
- RAMP software for producing synthetic demand timeseries in open energy system models
- Russian Anonymous Marketplace, a Russian dark web market that shut down in 2017

== Music ==
- RAMP (American band), an American soul/jazz group from Cincinnati
- RAMP (Portuguese band), a Portuguese metal band
- Ramp (album), a 1991 album by Giant Sand
- "Ramp" (ランプ, Ranpu), a 2007 song by Tokyo Jihen, off the album Variety
- "Ramp! (The Logical Song)", German band Scooter's 2001 cover of the 1979 Supertramp song "The Logical Song"

== Transportation ==
- Ramp or catwalk, used by models in a fashion show; see Runway (fashion)
- Airport ramp, the area where aircraft are loaded and unloaded
- Linkspan, on a ferry or a ferry slip
- Interchange (road) entrance ramp/on ramp or exit ramp/off ramp, on a freeway
- Speed bumps, also called ramps
- Wheelchair ramp, an alternative to stairs
- Parking ramp, a multi-story structure for car parking with ramps between floors
- Car ramp, a simple method of raising a vehicle from the ground

== Technology, science, engineering, mathematics ==
- Ramp function, in mathematics the integral of the unit step function
- Ramp waveform
- Receptor activity-modifying protein (RAMP), a class of protein
- (R)-1-amino-2-methoxymethylpyrrolidine, a chiral auxiliary used in the Enders SAMP/RAMP hydrazone-alkylation reaction

== Other uses ==
- Operation Ramp, an Australian Defence Force evacuation of civilians during the 2006 Lebanon War
- Ramp (company), an American financial service and technology company based in New York, NY.
- Ramp, a citrus soft drink
- Vert ramp and mini ramp, half-pipe structures used in gravity extreme sports
- Responsible Alcohol Management Program, a program of the Pennsylvania Liquor Control Board
- Allium tricoccum, a species of wild onion or garlic native to eastern North America, commonly called "ramp"

== See also ==
- Ramp-up
- Rampe, Valga Parish, Valga County, Estonia; a village
- Dane Rampe (born 1990), Australian player of Australian rules football
- Rampside (disambiguation)
