= Listed buildings in Wharton, Cumbria =

Wharton is a civil parish in Westmorland and Furness, Cumbria, England. It contains three listed buildings that are recorded in the National Heritage List for England. Of these, one is listed at Grade I, the highest of the three grades, and the others are at Grade II, the lowest grade. The parish is almost entirely rural, and the listed buildings consist of a ruined tower house, a medieval house, and a farmhouse.

== Key ==
Grade	Criteria
I	Buildings of exceptional interest, sometimes considered to be internationally important
II	Buildings of national importance and special interest

== Buildings ==
Name and location	Photograph	Date	Notes	Grade
Lammerside Castle; 54.43791°N 2.35221°W		14th century	Only the remains of the central core of the former tower house remain. They are in stone, and include the base of the tower, the barrel vaulted ground floor, and part of the first floor. The building is also a scheduled monument.	II
Wharton Hall; 54.45094°N 2.35508°W		14th century (probable)	The house was greatly extended during the 15th and 16th centuries with a great hall and solar and service wings, giving an H-shaped plan, and since then parts of the house have been lost. It is built in stone with quoins and a Welsh slate roof, and is partly embattled. The windows are mullioned, with square heads, multiple lights, and hood moulds.	I
Bullgill Farmhouse; 54.44197°N 2.36101°W	—	1661	The farmhouse is pebbledashed, with quoins and a stone-flagged roof. There are two storeys and a symmetrical front of five bays. The doorway has an architrave and a four-centred arch, and above it is a dated and inscribed panel. The windows are mullioned with stone surrounds.	II
