= Moresby Hall =

Grade I listed English country house in Cumbria

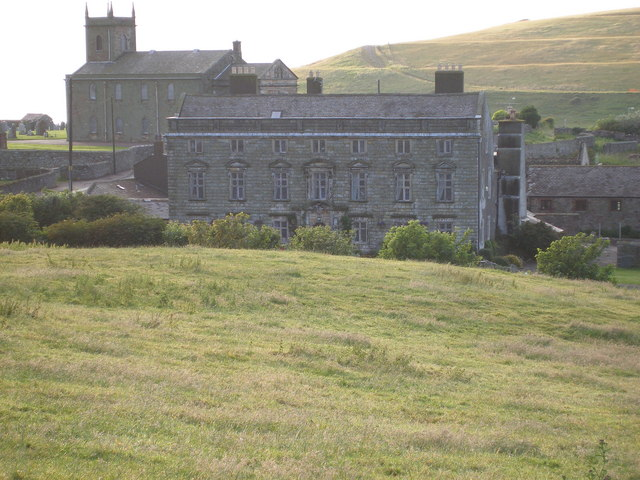
- Moresby Hall from the south, with St Bridget's Church behind it.

- Location within Cumbria

General information
- Location: Parton, Cumbria, England
- Coordinates: 54°34′25″N 3°34′26″W
- Opening: 1999
- Owner: Jane & David Saxon

Other information
- Number of rooms: 12

Website
- www.moresbyhall.co.uk

Moresby Hall is a former manor house and hotel in Parton, Cumbria, England, overlooking the Cumbrian Fells, and just to the north of the village of Moresby.

The hall is located south of Lowca, off the A595 on the A66-595, two miles (3.2 km) north of Whitehaven and 12 miles (19 km) south-west of Cockermouth. Dating back to the 12th century, it is a Grade I listed building and has been cited by English Heritage as being one of the most important buildings in Cumbria. Moresby Hall adjoins St Bridget's Church, built 1822 to 1823. The chancel arch of the previous building still stands in the graveyard.

== History ==
The name derives from the original builder named Morisceby, Mawriceby or Moricebi as early as 1150, when the Rosmerta Cottage was built using a spiral stone staircase believed to be from an original stone pele tower that preceded the property. The adjacent church is on the site of a Roman fort named Gabrosentum, the earth banks of which can still be seen. The graveyard of the church contains many of the people who lived and died at Moresby Hall and the hamlet of Low Moresby.

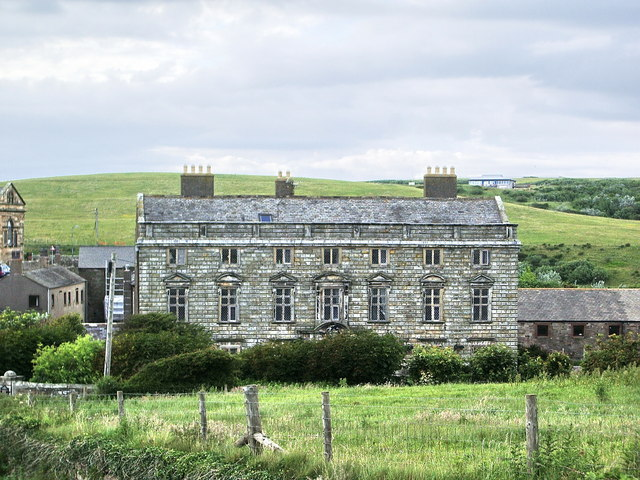
Moresby Hall

The wealthy Moresby family owned the estate for centuries during medieval times and had contacts with English royalty. Christopher de Moresby fought in the Battle of Agincourt and was knighted by King Henry V, and Anne, his great-granddaughter who was sole heiress of the estate, saw her fiancé Sir Francis Weston executed by King Henry VIII along with Queen Anne Boleyn.

Later the very wealthy Fletcher family (from Cockermouth) owned Moresby Hall for a 250-year period. During this period it underwent some changes by architect Inigo Jones around 1620 and later between 1670 and 1690, by either William Thackery or Edward Addison.

During the 18th century, the house was owned by several different people after Thomas Fletcher died childless. It fell into disrepair and was used as a farmhouse for some years, before it was restored in 1910 and became a small manor house again until 1955. Until the late 1990s it was owned by High Duty Alloys as a business venue.

Moresby Hall is now a hotel and was purchased by new owners in 2023.

== See also ==
- Grade I listed buildings in Cumbria
- Listed buildings in Parton, Cumbria
