= Wharton Hall =

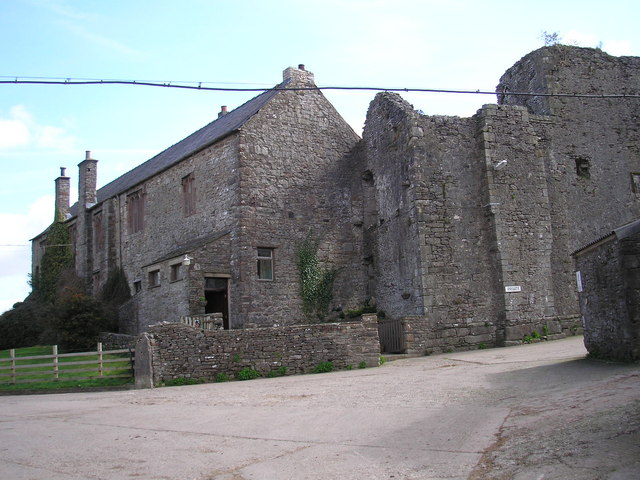
- Wharton Hall

- Location in Eden, Cumbria Location in Cumbria, England
- 54.4505°N 2.3547°W
- Type: Fortified manor house
- Location: Cumbria, England

Site notes
- Architectural style: medieval (limestone)

Scheduled monument

Listed Building – Grade I

Wharton Hall in Wharton, Cumbria, England, is a medieval fortified manor house.

== History ==
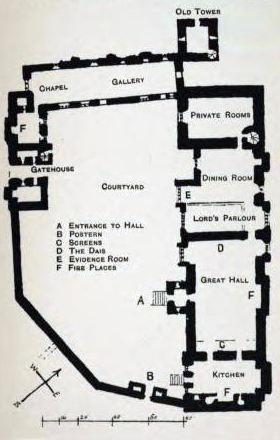
Plan of Wharton Hall

At the heart of Wharton Hall is a 15th-century hall, built from local limestone by the local Wharton, possibly Richard Wharton, after abandoning Lammerside Castle.

During the Pilgrimage of Grace in 1536, the manor was besieged by the forces of Robert Aske, and after 1544, Lord Wharton extended and fortified the manor, building a gatehouse, great hall, kitchen, and surrounding walls in a medieval style. The result was a grand property, with the great hall being 68 feet long.

Francis Knollys escorted Mary, Queen of Scots from Lowther Castle to Wharton on 14 July 1568, and the next day she went to Bolton Castle. Her son, King James I stayed at Wharton on 8 August 1617, returning from his visit to Scotland.

The Wharton family preferred to use Healaugh Priory near Tadcaster in North Yorkshire as their main residence after the 16th century, and the property fell into ruin. In 1785, Lord Lonsdale restored the building, adding more battlements. It was restored again in the 20th century to its current condition.

This site is a scheduled monument and Grade I listed building.

== See also ==
- Castles in Great Britain and Ireland
- List of castles in England
- Grade I listed buildings in Cumbria
- Listed buildings in Wharton, Cumbria

== Bibliography ==
- Emery, Anthony. (1996) Greater Medieval Houses of England and Wales, 1300-1500: Northern England. Cambridge: Cambridge University Press. ISBN 978-0-521-49723-7.
- Taylor, M. W. (1892) Old Manorial Halls of Westmorland and Cumberland. Kendal: T. Wilson. OCLC 22355479.
