= Grade II* listed buildings in Cumbria =

Cumbria shown within England

The county of Cumbria is divided into two unitary authorities, Cumberland and Westmorland and Furness.

As there are 460 Grade II* listed buildings in the county they have been split into separate lists for each unitary authority.

- Grade II* listed buildings in Cumberland
- Grade II* listed buildings in Westmorland and Furness

== See also ==
- Grade I listed buildings in Cumbria
- Category:Grade II* listed buildings in Cumbria
