= Listed buildings in Askerton =

Askerton is a civil parish in the Cumberland district of Cumbria, England. It contains eight listed buildings that are recorded in the National Heritage List for England. Of these, one is listed at Grade I, the highest of the three grades, and the others are at Grade II, the lowest grade. The parish includes the village of Kirkcambeck and is otherwise rural. The major building in the parish is Askerton Castle, a fortified house; this and buildings associated with it are listed. The other listed buildings are the Anglican parish church of St Kentigern, houses, one of which is a ruin, and a reconstructed arch.

== Key ==
Grade	Criteria
I	Buildings of exceptional interest, sometimes considered to be internationally important
II	Buildings of national importance and special interest

== Buildings ==
Name and location	Photograph	Date	Notes	Grade
Arch near St Kentigern's Church; 55.01305°N 2.73059°W	—	13th century (probable)	The arch is from the former parish church, and was rebuilt in the 18th century. It is in sandstone, and consists of a pointed arch that was constructed from pieces of masonry from a church that was destroyed in the 14th century.	II
Askerton Castle; 55.01588°N 2.70471°W		Early 14th century	A fortified house that was altered and extended in the following centuries, then in the 19th century by Anthony Salvin and in 1922 by Edmond Warre. It is built in calciferous sandstone on large plinth stones and has slate roofs. The house has three storeys and four bays, with flanking four-storey single-bay towers that have projecting battlemented parapets. A curtain wall encloses a courtyard at the rear, and in the courtyard is an L-shaped hall and a barrack block. The main block contains a doorway with a chamfered surround and a pointed arch, and mullioned windows.	I
Bastle House; 55.07112°N 2.64921°W	—	Late 16th or early 17th century	The house formerly had two storeys but is now a ruin. There are three very thick-walls in calciferous sandstone, and a fourth rebuilt wall. The walls contain the original chamfered and rebated jambs.	II
Woodhead; 55.05828°N 2.66377°W	—	Late 16th or early 17th century	The house is in calciferous sandstone and grey sandstone and has a slate roof. There are two storeys and three bays. The door and casement windows date from the 20th century.	II
Barns and byres, Askerton Castle; 55.01551°N 2.70474°W	—	Early 19th century	The farm buildings are in calciferous sandstone with quoins, some roofs are in green slate and others are in Welsh slate. The buildings are in a single storey, and the barns also have a loft; together they enclose four sides of a farmyard. The openings include doorways, windows, a segmental-arched cart entrance, ventilation slits, and a loft door.	II
Knorren Lodge; 55.00424°N 2.72719°W	—	Early 19th century	A rendered house with quoins, modillioned eaves, and a hipped green slate roof. There are two storeys and seven bays. The doorway has a moulded architrave and a radial fanlight with a segmental head and a raised keystone. The windows are sashes in plain stone surrounds.	II
Byres, Askerton Castle; 55.01579°N 2.70422°W	—	Mid 19th century	The byres are built in calciferous sandstone. and have roofs of sandstone slate with coped gables. They have two storeys and three bays. In the ground floor are plank doors and casement windows, and above are a loft door and ventilation slits.	II
St Kentigern's Church; 55.01297°N 2.73088°W	—	1885	The original parish church was destroyed in the 14th century and stone from it was used to build the Grade II-listed arch nearby. The replacement, a simple red sandstone building in the Arts and Crafts style with some Gothic Revival elements, was designed by an unknown architect in 1884. The church has a nave and an apse but no separate chancel.	II
