= Listed buildings in Parton, Cumbria =

Parton is a civil parish in the Cumberland district, Cumbria, England. It contains eight buildings that are recorded in the National Heritage List for England. Of these, one is listed at Grade I, the highest of the three grades, and the others are at Grade II, the lowest grade. The parish contains the village of Parton, and is largely residential. The listed buildings comprise a country house and associated structures, a church and items in the churchyard, a former toll house, and a milestone.

== Key ==
Grade	Criteria
I	Buildings of exceptional interest, sometimes considered to be internationally important
II	Buildings of national importance and special interest

== Buildings ==
Name and location	Photograph	Date	Notes	Grade
Chancel arch 54.57389°N 3.57513°W		13th century (probable)	The chancel arch of an earlier church is in the churchyard of St Bridget's Church, to the south of the church. It is in stone, and consists of a slightly pointed arch. On the south side is a brass plate recording burials, and tombstones are attached to the arch.	II
Brittons' tomb 54.57398°N 3.57494°W	—	1663 or (1668)	A table tomb in the churchyard of St Bridget's Church. It is to the memory of a father and son who were lost at sea on the same ship, and consists of sandstone blocks supporting a flat top with an inscription and date.	II
Moresby Hall; 54.57369°N 3.57402°W		c. 1670	This was the remodelling of an earlier country house. It is in stuccoed stone and has slate roofs. The front has 2 1/2 storeys, and seven bays, and is completely rusticated, with a cornice, a blocking course, and pilasters. In the centre is a round-headed doorway with a rusticated surround and an open segmental pediment containing a coat of arms. All the windows have architraves, they are mullioned. some also have one or two transoms, and those in the upper floor have pediments, alternately triangular and segmental.	I
Wall and gate piers, Moresby Hall; 54.57332°N 3.57404°W	—	Late 17th century (probable)	The walls around the entrance are in stone with triangular coping and are about 6 feet (1.8 m) high. The gate piers are rusticated, about 8 feet (2.4 m) high, and have cornices with domed tops.	II
Farm outbuilding, Moresby Hall; 54.57403°N 3.57397°W	—	18th century	The outbuilding is in sandstone with ashlar dressings and a slate roof. It has two storeys, and in the south front are two entrances with sandstone lintels, a window between them, and three ventilation slits above. At the rear are two similar entrances and one ventilation slit.	II
St Bridget's Church; 54.57415°N 3.57512°W		1822–23	The church is built on the site of a Roman fort, and replaces a 12th-century church. The chancel was added and the interior was refurbished in 1885–88. The church is in ashlar on a moulded plinth, with corner pilasters, an eaves band, a cornice, and a slate roof with stone copings. It consists of a nave embracing a west tower, and a chancel. The tower has three stages and a parapet with obelisk pinnacles on the corners. On the sides of the church are two tiers of windows; all the windows and the doorway have round heads, and at the east end is a Venetian window. Inside the church is a west gallery.	II
Milestone; 54.57048°N 3.57451°W		Mid 19th century	The milestone consists of a square sandstone block about 2 feet (0.61 m) high with a chamfered top, set diagonally to the road. On the north face is a rectangular cast iron plate inscribed with the distance in miles to Whitehaven. The plate from the other face is missing.	II
Bransty Toll Bar; 54.56378°N 3.58183°W	—	1854	Originally a toll house built for the Whitehaven Turnpike Trust, later a private house. It is in rendered stone on a chamfered plinth with a slate roof and gables with decorated bargeboards. There are three bays and one storey. In the centre bay is a doorway with a four-centred arched head and a fanlight. To the right is a sash window, to the left is a canted bay window with a cornice, and on each side is one sash window; all the windows have chamfered surrounds.	II
