= Askerton Castle =

Castle in Cumbria, England

- Cumbria, England
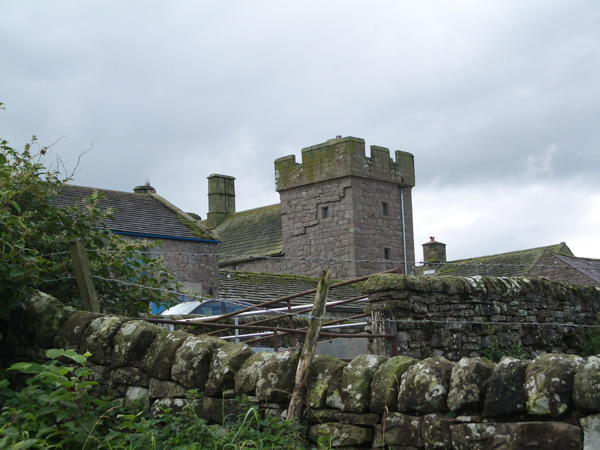
- Askerton Tower

Site information
- Type: Fortified manor house

Location
- Shown within Cumbria
- Location within Cumbria
- Coordinates: 55.0153°N 2.7053°W
- Grid reference: grid reference NY550692

Askerton Castle is a medieval fortified manor house in Cumbria, England.

== History ==
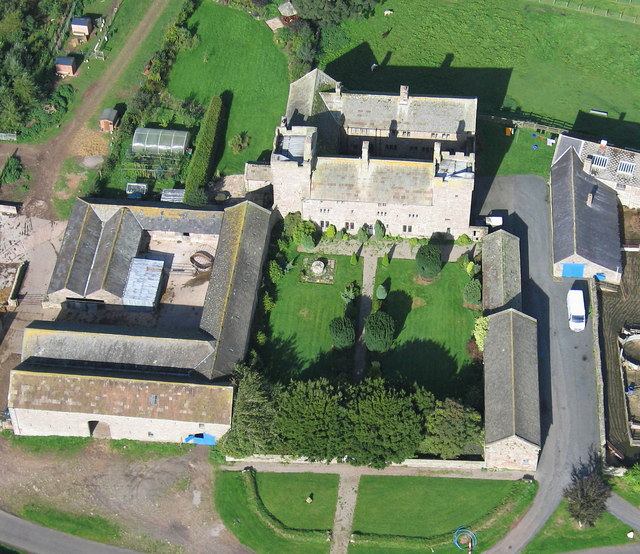
Aerial photograph of the castle

Askerton Castle was built in the parish of Askerton in Cumbria around 1290. Originally the castle was an unfortified manor, but in the late-15th century Thomas Dacre, 2nd Baron Dacre built two crenellated towers on either end of the hall range, probably with the aim of increasing the living space in the property rather than simply for reasons of defence. A third tower may have been built on the north-west corner of the property, this time for defensive purposes, but has since been lost. The castle was renovated by architect Anthony Salvin in the 1850s.

Askerton Castle is a Grade I listed building.

== See also ==
- Grade I listed buildings in Cumbria
- Listed buildings in Askerton
- Castles in Great Britain and Ireland
- List of castles in England

Media related to Askerton Castle at Wikimedia Commons

== Bibliography ==
- Emery, Anthony. (1996) Greater Medieval Houses of England and Wales, 1300-1500: Northern England. Cambridge: Cambridge University Press. ISBN 978-0-521-49723-7.
