= The Castle Dairy =

Medieval building in Cumbria, England

Coordinates: 54.3309°N 2.7406°W

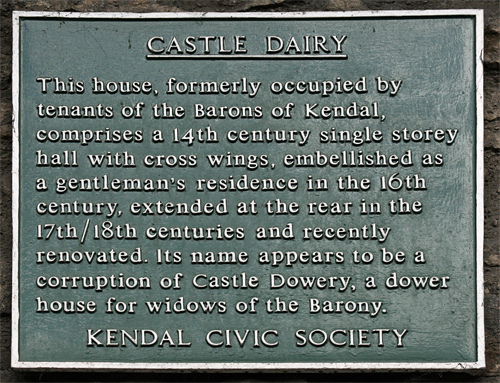
Castle Dairy - @Wildman Street, Kendal - 'Castle Dairy. This house formerly occupied by tenants of the Barons of Kendal, comprises a 14th-century single storey hall with cross wings, embellished as a gentleman's residence in the 16th century, extended at the rear in the 17th-18th centuries and recently renovated. Its name appears to be a corruption of Castle Dowery, a dower house for widows of the Barony.' by Kendal Civic Society (openplaques.org ID=11714)

The Castle Dairy is a medieval building located in Kendal, Cumbria. The name implies a connection to Kendal Castle and it is possibly the town's oldest continuously inhabited structure.

A Grade I listed building, it is now a restaurant. The building is located on the north side of Wildman Street, near to Stramongate Bridge, to which it may also have some connection.

== Design ==
The two-storey building's exterior is constructed of coursed rubble with quoins. The interior has a central hall with cross wings at either end. It retains numerous historic features, including carvings, fireplaces and original windows, and the interior has been described as exceptionally well preserved.

The upper floor holds a small chapel which has a 14th-century window, reputed to be the smallest window in Kendal.

== Early history ==
While the building's original use is uncertain, it may have been a farmhouse or private residence. The name 'dairy' may be a corruption of the word dowry and it has been speculated that the property was the home of a widow at some point.

Around 1560, the building was extensively remodelled for Anthony Garnett and numerous dated features remain.

== Renovation and current use ==
For many years, the building was a restaurant, but this closed in 2007 and the building fell into disrepair. It was included on Historic England's 'Heritage at Risk' register in 2010. South Lakeland District Council approached Kendal College about incorporating the building into its campus and extensive refurbishment took place between March and September 2011. Funding for the £200,000 project came from English Heritage, the district council, the college and two additional organisations, the Savoy Trust and Lakeland Vintners.

The Castle Dairy reopened in October 2011, with the ceremony performed by historian David Starkey, who grew up in the town. The Castle Dairy now operates as an art gallery and a college-run restaurant, with food prepared by Kendal College hospitality students.

== See also ==
- Grade I listed buildings in Cumbria
- Listed buildings in Kendal
