= Carlisle Guildhall =

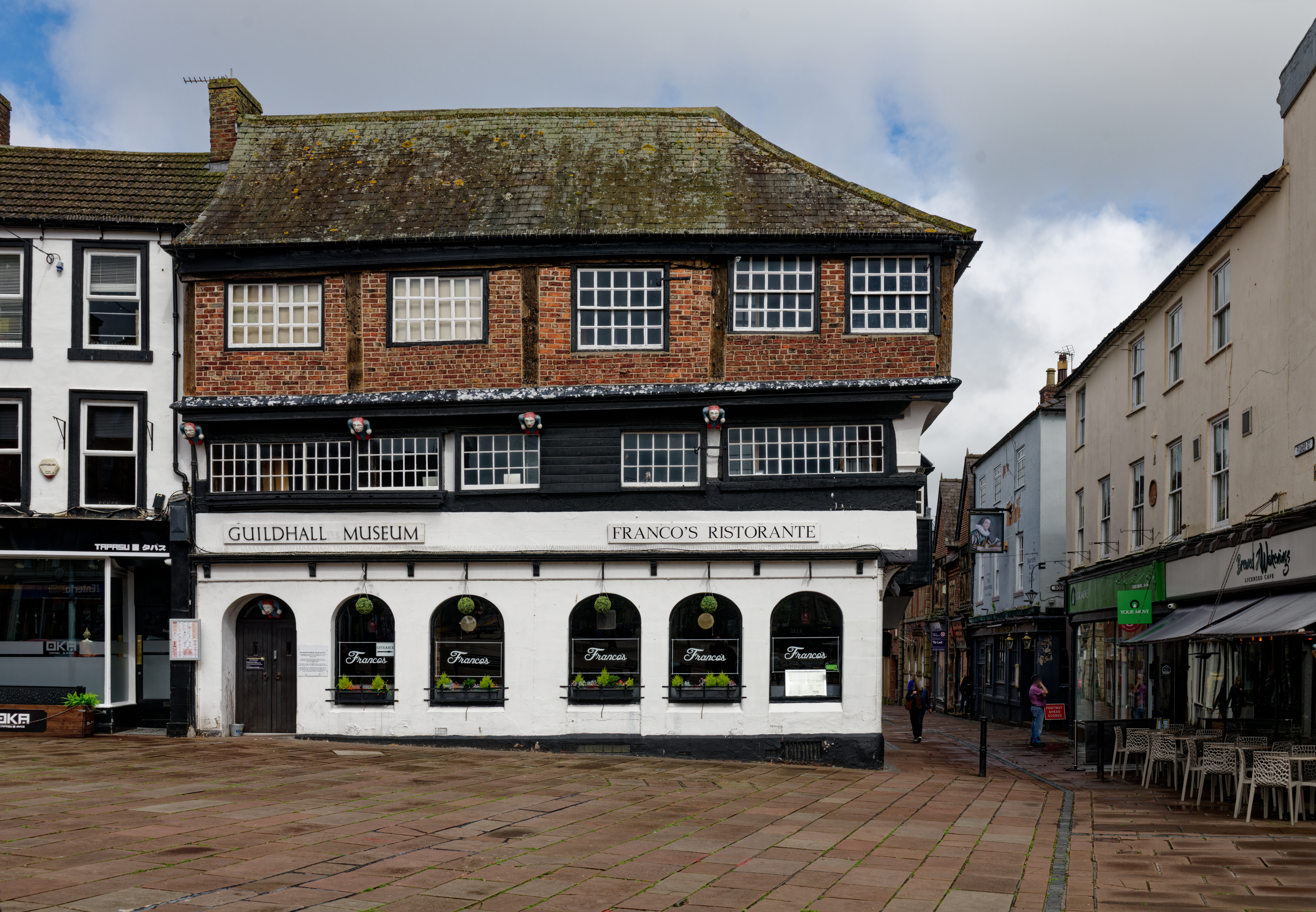
- Viewed from Greenmarket
- Interactive map of the Carlisle Guildhall area

General information
- Status: Grade I listed
- Location: Carlisle, Cumbria grid reference NY 400 560
- Coordinates: 54°53′41.6″N 2°56′11.2″W
- Completed: 1407

Website
- The Guildhall Museum

Carlisle Guildhall is an historic building in Carlisle, Cumbria. It is in the city centre, on the corner of Fisher Street and Greenmarket.

It is a Grade I listed building, listed on 1 June 1949. The upper floors now house a museum.

== History and description ==
It was built by Richard de Redness, probably between 1396 and 1407; it is thought that it was built after a fire in 1391 that destroyed many buildings in Carlisle.

It is an L-shaped timber-framed building. There is an open roof structure; dendrochronology of the roof timber has shown that it all dates from the original construction of the building, although the roof of the Fisher Street section, supported by four crown posts, is constructed differently from the Greenmarket section.

The ground floor, which may have been originally an open structure, has been used for trading during its history.

The museum, housed in the upper floors, was opened in 1978. The exhibits show the history of the guilds of Carlisle.

== See also ==
- Grade I listed buildings in Cumbria
- Listed buildings in Carlisle, Cumbria
