= Morecambe gas fields =

Gas field

Morecambe South gas field
- Location in North West England Location in England
- Country: United Kingdom
- Region: Irish Sea
- Location/blocks: UK Block 110/2a and extends into Blocks 110/3a, 110/8a, 110/7a
- Offshore/onshore: offshore
- Coordinates: 53°50′48″N 3°34′51″W
- Operators: Hydrocarbons GB Limited, British Gas E & P Ltd, Centrica plc, Spirit Energy
- Owner: Hydrocarbons GB Limited, British Gas E & P Ltd, Centrica plc, Spirit Energy
- Service contractors: see text

Field history
- Discovery: September 1974
- Start of production: January 1985

Production
- Estimated gas in place: 150×10^{9} m^{3} (5.3×10^{12} cu ft)
- Producing formations: Triassic sandstone

The Morecambe gas fields are two major natural gas producing fields in the Irish Sea, 27 km west of Blackpool and Morecambe Bay.

== The fields ==
The Morecambe South field is in UK Block 110/2a and extends into Blocks 110/3a, 110/8a, 110/7a; Morecambe North is in Block 110/2a. The fields were discovered in September 1974 and February 1976 respectively. The fields are named after a light-ship station, they are sometimes erroneously called Morecambe Bay.

The gas reservoir is a Triassic sandstone and has the following characteristics.

Morecambe reservoir properties
Reservoir depth, feet	2,200 to 3,750
Gas column, feet	1,650
Porosity, %	12-15
Nitrogen content, %	7-8
Pressure at depth	1,875 psi @ 3,750 feet
Recoverable reserves, trillion cubic feet (1985)	5. 2
Recoverable reserves South billion cubic metres (1994)	150.0 / 5.2 Tcf
Recoverable reserves North billion cubic metres (1994)	35.0 / 1.2 Tcf

== Owner and operator ==
In 1985 the sole licensee of the field and the operator was Hydrocarbons GB Limited. This had become British Gas E & P Ltd by 1994, then Centrica plc in 1997. In 2017, Centrica launched Spirit Energy a joint venture with German energy and infrastructure company Stadtwerke München (SWM). Spirit Energy assumed ownership of the Morecambe gas fields.

== Development ==
The Morecambe gas fields development was to provide peak UK demand for gas in the winter. Morecambe South was developed around a central drilling, production and accommodation complex. This comprised three bridge linked platforms plus a bridge-linked flare tower. Details of the platforms are as shown.

Morecambe South central complex platforms
Platform	CPP1	AP1	DP1
Type	Steel jacket	Steel jacket	Steel jacket
Function	Central processing	Accommodation for 176	Wellhead drilling
Coordinates	53°50’48”N 03°34’51”W	53.846667N 3.580556W	53.846861N 3.580556W
Water depth, metres	26	26	26
Design contractors	Matthew Hall Eng.	Matthew Hall Eng.	Worley-Atkins
Topsides fabrication	Wm Press, Wallsend		
Topside installation	March 1984	June 1984	1985
Jacket fabrication	RGC Offshore, Methil	RGC Offshore, Methil	McDermott, Ardesier
Jacket weight, tonnes	11,754	4,100	5,500
Jacket installation	October 1983	March 1984	April 1984
Legs	8	4	4
Piles	32	12	
Wells	–	–	16 (5-8 planned)
Startup	January 1984	–	1985
Export to	Barrow, 39 km 36-inch pipeline	–	CPP1 via bridge

The central complex Flare tower (53.846667N 3.580556W) is linked by a bridge to the CPP1 platform. It is supported by a 3-leg jacket.

In addition to the central DP1 drilling and wellhead platform, four other wellhead platforms were installed in the field, each producing well fluids to the CPP1 platform.

Morecambe South wellhead platforms
Platform	DP3	DP4	DP6	DP8
Type	Steel jacket	Steel jacket	Steel jacket	Steel jacket
Function	Wellhead drilling	Wellhead drilling	Wellhead drilling	Wellhead drilling
Coordinates	53°49’00”N 03°33’37”W	53°52’34”N 03°39’39”W	53.867278N 3.616650W	53.891872N 3.622833W
Water depth, metres	30	30	32	32
Accommodation	6	6		
Design contractors	Worley-Atkins	Worley-Atkins		
Topsides weight, tonnes	5,200	5,200		
Topside installation	September 1983	July 1984		
Jacket fabrication	McDermott, Ardesier	Howard Doris, Kishorm		
Jacket weight, tonnes	5,500	5,500		
Jacket installation	July 1983	July 1984		
Legs	4	4		
Wells	16 (5-8 planned)	16 (5-8 planned)		
Startup	1985	1985	1985	1985
Export to	CPP1, 3.5 km 24-inch pipeline	CPP1, 3.5 km 24-inch pipeline	CPP1, 3.2 km 24-inch pipeline	CPP1, 5.8km 24-inch pipeline

Because the gas reservoir is shallow, and to avoid a large deviation of the wells, slant drilling is used. Two jack up drilling rigs were built to undertake 30 degree slant drilling. The rigs were Morecambe Flame and Bay Driller.

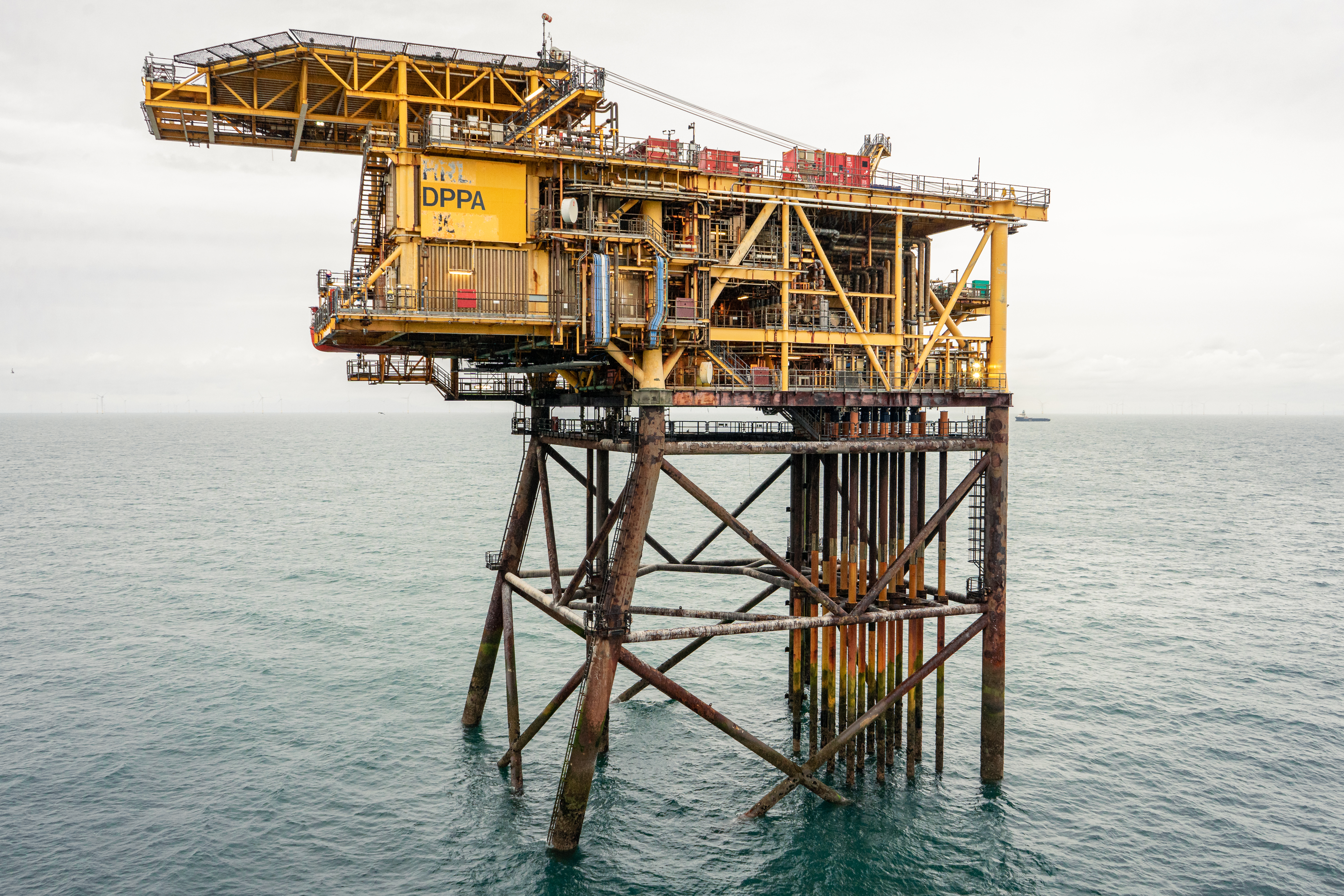
Morecambe North (DPPA) offshore installation.

In 1984 a single drilling and production platform was installed in the Morecambe North field.

Platform	Block	Coordinates	Water depth	Operational	Export
Morecambe North	110/2a	53.960578N 3.670694W	29 metres	October 1994	37 km pipeline to Barrow

The Bains field was developed in 2002 by a single subsea wellhead producing well fluids to DP1 via a 8.3 km 8-inch pipeline.

The Bains field was developed in 2002 by a single subsea wellhead producing well fluids to DP1 via a 8.3 km 8-inch pipeline.

Field	Block	Coordinates	Water depth	Operational
Bains	110/3c	53.875833N 3.465556W	18 metres	2002

The North Morecambe platform was modified to tie in the Millom East / West and Dalton fields, and in 2013 the addition of the Rhyl field.

== Production ==
Well fluids from the wellhead platforms are piped to the CPP1 platform. Three phase separation into gas, condensate and water is undertaken. The gas is dehydrated using tri-ethylene glycol. Dry gas together with condensate is piped ashore.

Initial production from Morecambe South field in the winter of 1984-5 was 120 million standard cubic feet of gas per day (MMSCFD). This increased to 450 MMSCFD in the winter of 1985-6 and ultimately to 1,200 MMSCFD. The first year of peak production was 1993 when the South field produced 8.6 billion cubic metres per year.

The first year of peak production for the Morecambe North field was 1995 when the field produced 3.1 billion cubic metres of gas per year.

== Decommissioning ==
The decommissioning of the DP3 and DP4 platforms is currently (2021) underway.

== See also ==
- Rampside gas terminal
