= Michael Waistell Taylor =

Scottish physician

Michael Waistell Taylor (1824–1892) was a Scottish physician, known also as an antiquarian.

== Life ==
The son of Michael Taylor, an Edinburgh merchant, was born at Portobello in Midlothian on 29 January 1824. He was educated at Portsmouth, and matriculated at the University of Edinburgh in 1840, studying botany and graduating with an MD in 1843. In the following year he obtained a diploma from the Edinburgh College of Physicians and Surgeons. He was appointed assistant to Professor John Hutton Balfour, and was also one of the founders and early presidents of the Hunterian Medical Society.

During 1844 Taylor studied surgery at Paris for nine months, and then visited European cities collecting botanical specimens. In 1845 he settled at Penrith in Cumberland, and soon after that succeeded to the practice of Dr John Taylor. In 1858 he discovered that scarlet fever might be caused by contamination in the milk supply. In 1868 he assisted in founding the border counties branch of the British Medical Association, and was the second to hold the office of president.

Taylor as an antiquary made local discoveries: the vestiges of Celtic occupation on Ullswater, the starfish cairns of Moor Divock, the prehistoric remains at Clifton, and the Croglin moulds for casting spear-heads in bronze. He was elected a fellow of the Society of Antiquaries of London on 27 May 1886, and was a fellow of the Scottish Society of Antiquaries, a member of the Epidemiological Society, and a member of the council of the Royal Archæological Institute. He joined the Cumberland and Westmorland Antiquarian and Archæological Society soon after its formation in 1866.

Taylor retired from medical practice in 1884, and died in London on 24 November 1892. He is buried at Penrith in the Christ Church burial-ground.

== Works ==
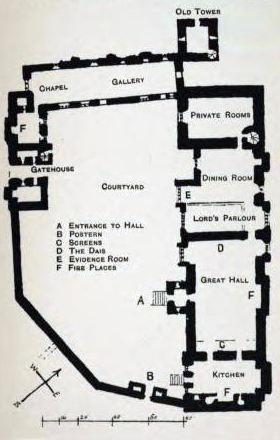
Floor plan of Wharton Hall, from Old Manorial Halls of Westmorland and Cumberland by Michael Waistell Taylor

Taylor was the author of medical treatises on subjects, and in 1881 wrote a substantial article on the fungoid nature of diphtheria. At the time of his death he had completed a long work on the Old Manorial Halls of Westmorland and Cumberland (London, 1892).

== Family ==
In 1858 Taylor married Mary Rayner, daughter of J. H. Rayner of Liverpool. Together they had three daughters and three sons.

== Notes ==
Attribution

This article incorporates text from a publication now in the public domain: Lee, Sidney, ed. (1898). "Taylor, Michael Waistell". Dictionary of National Biography. Vol. 55. London: Smith, Elder & Co.
