= Moresby, Cumbria =

Civil parish in Cumbria, England

Coordinates: 54.560°N 3.551°W

Moresby
- Civil parish
- St. Bridget’s Church in Moresby

- Location in the former Copeland Borough Location within Cumbria
- Population: 1,997 (2011)
- OS grid reference: NY9919
- Civil parish: Moresby
- Unitary authority: Cumberland
- Ceremonial county: Cumbria
- Region: North West
- Country: England
- Sovereign state: United Kingdom
- Post town: WHITEHAVEN
- Postcode district: CA28
- Dialling code: 01946
- Police: Cumbria
- Fire: Cumbria
- Ambulance: North West
- UK Parliament: Whitehaven and Workington

Moresby is a civil parish in Cumbria, England. It had a population of 1,997 at the 2011 census.

== Demographics ==
It had a population of 1,280 at the 2001 census, increasing to 1,997 at the 2011 Census. Most people live in Low Moresby on the east side of the A595, or Moresby Parks, a larger village south of Low Moresby.

== Toponymy ==
Moresby means “bȳ of Maurice”, Maurice being a saint popular in the area." 'Bȳ' is Old Norse and means 'hamlet', 'village'.

Moresby Hall in Parton, close to Moresby, is a Grade I listed building. The name of the hall and the village is thought to come from a family who settled in the area.

== Governance ==
An electoral ward of the same name exists. This ward is not the complete area of Moresby parish and at the 2011 Census had a population of 1,448.

== See also ==
- Listed buildings in Moresby, Cumbria
