= Listed buildings in Moresby, Cumbria =

Moresby is a civil parish in the Cumberland district of Cumbria, England. It contains three listed buildings that are recorded in the National Heritage List for England. Of these, one is listed at Grade II*, the middle of the three grades, and the others are at Grade II, the lowest grade. The parish lies to the east of the town of Whitehaven, and its listed buildings comprise a country house, a feature in its garden, and a nearby barn that has been converted into a theatre.

== Key ==
Grade	Criteria
II*	Particularly important buildings of more than special interest
II	Buildings of national importance and special interest

== Buildings ==
Name and location	Photograph	Date	Notes	Grade
Rose Hill and wall 54.56777°N 3.56223°W	—	Late 18th century	A country house in ashlar, with end pilasters, an eaves band, a cornice, and a slate roof. It has two storeys, and the entrance front is curved with five bays. In the centre is a Doric porch with two fluted columns. At the extreme right of the front is a round-headed stair window, and to the right of this is a wing with an eyebrow dormer on the side. In the garden front are two full-height canted bay windows, and a small Venetian window in each gable. The other windows are sashes. To the right of the house is a wall containing a doorway with an Ionic surround and a pediment.	II*
Balustrade and sculpture, Rose Hill; 54.56788°N 3.56193°W	—	Early to mid 19th century (probable)	A feature in the garden, the balustrade is about 3 feet (0.91 m) high, and consists of three sections of balusters with a moulded plinth and coping between four piers. On the balustrade are three groups of putti, and an urn with a cover and swags.	II
Rosehill Theatre; 54.56720°N 3.56247°W		19th century	Originally a barn, it was converted into a theatre in 1959 for Sir Nicholas Sekers, the interior being designed by Oliver Messel. The original part is in stone, additions are in brick and timber, most of it is weatherboarded, and the roof is tiled. The barn forms the auditorium, and the additions form the stage, offices and a bar. The theatre seats 200 people, and its proscenium arch came from a hotel in Whitehaven.	II
