= Carlisle Tithe Barn =

Historic building in Carlisle, England

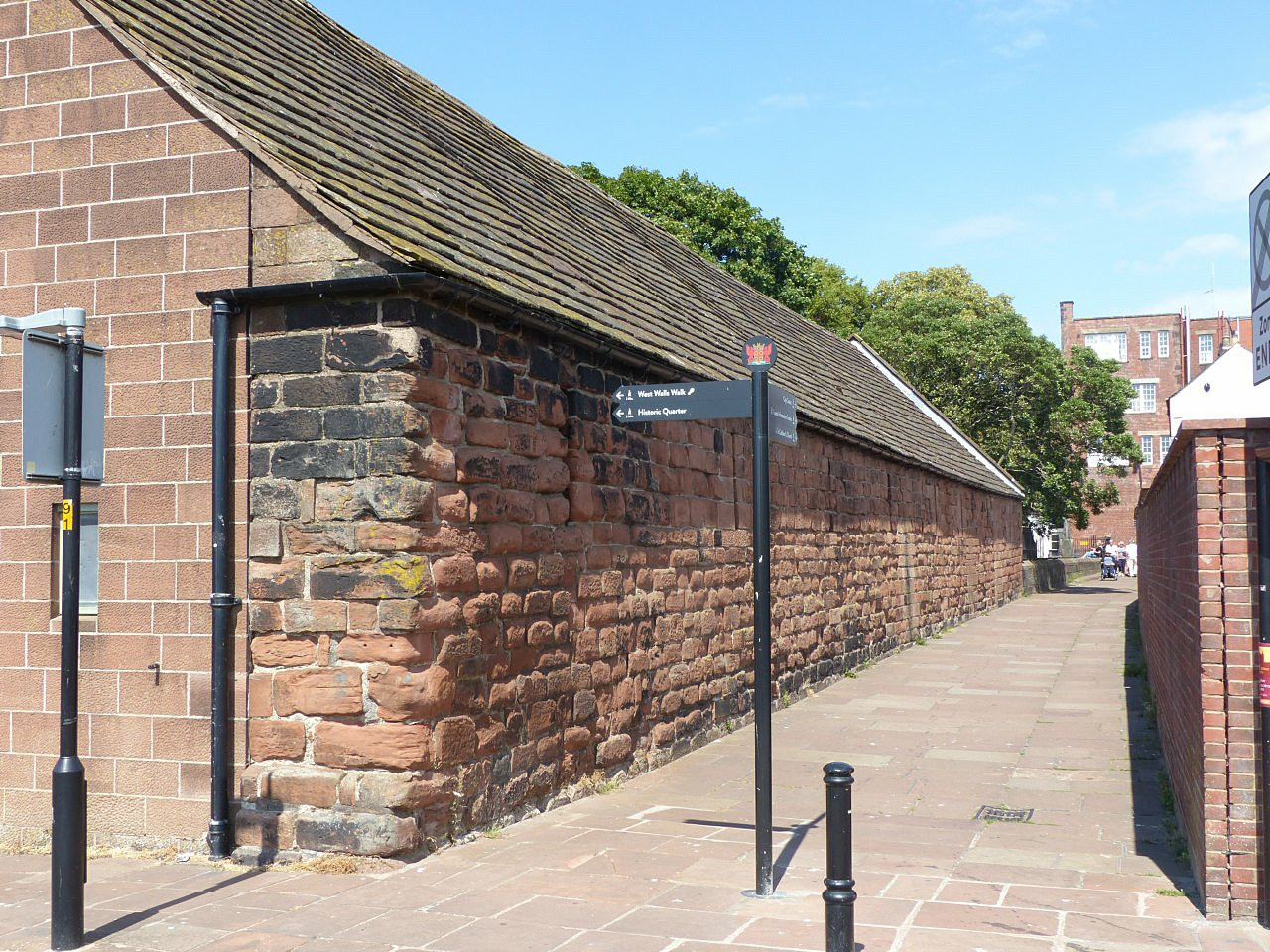
- The tithe barn alongside Heads Lane

General information
- Status: Grade I listed
- Type: Tithe barn
- Location: Carlisle, Cumbria grid reference NY 400 558
- Country: England
- Coordinates: 54°53′35.9″N 2°56′14.9″W
- Completed: 1470s

Carlisle Tithe Barn is an historic building in Carlisle, Cumbria. It is a Grade I listed building, listed on 1 June 1949.

== History and description ==
The tithe barn was built about the 1470s for Prior Gondibour, as part of the Priory of St Mary. After the Dissolution of the Monasteries the priory church was refounded as Carlisle Cathedral; the barn was subsequently used for various purposes, including stable and dispensary.

The north side of the barn is thought to have been open originally. The south side, along Heads Lane, is a wall of sandstone 3 feet 7 inches (1.09 m) thick. Internally, oak roof trusses are supported on each side by large timber posts.

There were modifications in 1824, when the building was adapted for use as a dispensary. In 1875 parts of the west end, in danger of collapse, were dismantled. The building was semi-derelict before purchase and restoration by St Cuthbert's Church in 1969–71; it has since been the church hall, and venue for social events.

== See also ==
- Grade I listed buildings in Cumbria
- Listed buildings in Carlisle, Cumbria
