= Askerton =

Civil parish in Cumbria, England

Coordinates: 55.020°N 2.696°W

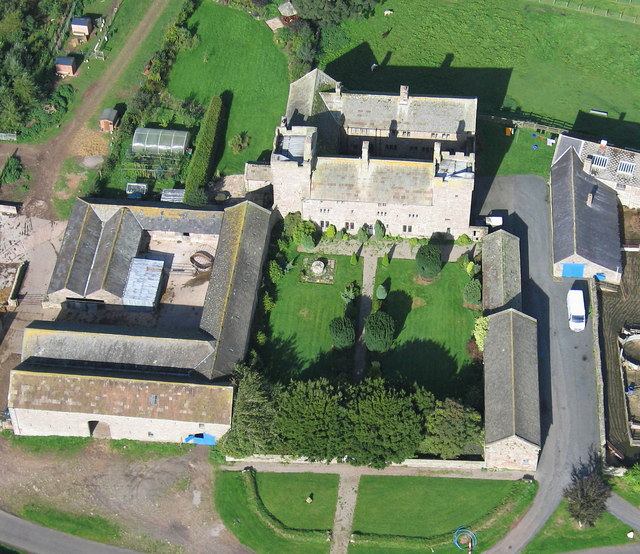
- Askerton Castle

- Location within Cumbria
- Population: 139 (2021)
- OS grid reference: NY555697
- Civil parish: Askerton
- Unitary authority: Cumberland
- Ceremonial county: Cumbria
- Region: North West
- Country: England
- Sovereign state: United Kingdom
- Post town: BRAMPTON
- Postcode district: CA8
- Dialling code: 016977
- Police: Cumbria
- Fire: Cumbria
- Ambulance: North West
- UK Parliament: Carlisle

Askerton is a civil parish in the Cumberland district of Cumbria, England. It has a population of 162 according to the 2001 census, decreasing to 141 at the 2011 Census, and 139 at the 2021 census. It includes various hamlets including Kirkcambeck and Shopford. It also covers Side Fell and Askerton Castle.

The parish was originally a township of Lanercost parish.

== Toponymy ==
The name probably means 'Ásgeirr's tūn.''Ásgeirr' is a Scandinavian personal name, while tūn is Old English for 'farmstead, estate' or, if the place prospered, 'village'. So, 'the estate of Ásgeirr'.

== Climate ==
Askerton has an oceanic climate (Köppen: Cfb). Spadeadam is the closest weather station to Askerton, located near RAF Spadeadam.

Climate data for Spadeadam, Elevation: 285 m (935 ft), 1991–2020 normals
Month	Jan	Feb	Mar	Apr	May	Jun	Jul	Aug	Sep	Oct	Nov	Dec	Year
Mean daily maximum °C (°F)	4.8 (40.6)	5.3 (41.5)	7.3 (45.1)	10.4 (50.7)	13.7 (56.7)	16.2 (61.2)	18.0 (64.4)	17.4 (63.3)	15.1 (59.2)	11.3 (52.3)	7.6 (45.7)	5.2 (41.4)	11.0 (51.8)
Daily mean °C (°F)	2.4 (36.3)	2.6 (36.7)	4.1 (39.4)	6.4 (43.5)	9.3 (48.7)	12.0 (53.6)	13.9 (57.0)	13.6 (56.5)	11.4 (52.5)	8.2 (46.8)	5.0 (41.0)	2.7 (36.9)	7.6 (45.7)
Mean daily minimum °C (°F)	0.0 (32.0)	0.0 (32.0)	0.9 (33.6)	2.4 (36.3)	4.9 (40.8)	7.9 (46.2)	9.8 (49.6)	9.8 (49.6)	7.8 (46.0)	5.1 (41.2)	2.4 (36.3)	0.2 (32.4)	4.3 (39.7)
Average precipitation mm (inches)	123.6 (4.87)	99.6 (3.92)	91.5 (3.60)	75.7 (2.98)	78.5 (3.09)	95.7 (3.77)	115.0 (4.53)	127.8 (5.03)	105.5 (4.15)	126.9 (5.00)	125.7 (4.95)	136.9 (5.39)	1,302.4 (51.28)
Source: Met Office

== See also ==
- Listed buildings in Askerton
