= Rampside Gas Terminal =

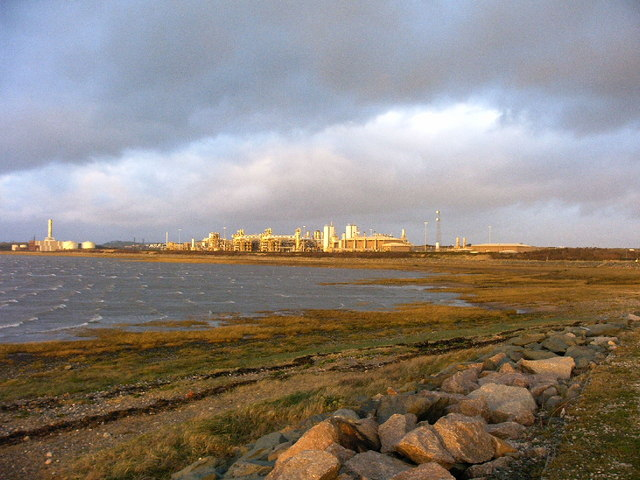
- View of the terminals from the south

- Location in Barrow-in-Furness Borough Location in Cumbria
- Alternative names: Morecambe Bay Gas Terminal, Rivers Gas Terminal, North Morecambe On-Shore Terminal

General information
- Type: Gas terminal
- Location: Rampside Road (A5087), Barrow-in-Furness, LA13 0QU
- Coordinates: 54.09816°N 3.18367°W
- Inaugurated: 1985

Design and construction
- Main contractor: Costain Oil and Gas (Rivers Terminal)

Rampside Gas Terminal is a gas terminal situated in Barrow-in-Furness, Cumbria on the Irish Sea coast. It connects to gas fields in Morecambe Bay. It is situated adjacent to the former Roosecote Power Station.

== History ==
Production started in 1985 with the South Morecambe gas field. The North Morecambe terminal was built in 1992. The Rivers Fields Area was discovered in 1982. The terminal was built on a site used by the former Roosecote coal-fired power station.

== Operations ==
It consists of three gas terminals, situated between Roose to the north and Rampside to the south. The sea around the gas platforms is around 30 metres (93 ft) deep. Centrica's facilities employ about 400 people, with a maximum of 172 people offshore, with around 140 being Centrica personnel. Offshore personnel are transferred via helicopter from Blackpool International Airport and also directly from the terminal itself with flights currently operated by Bond Offshore Helicopters. Gas is transferred to the terminals via 36 inch pipelines. Gas, after processing and compression, is supplied to the National Transmission System. Gas was formerly transferred to the Roosecote Power Station, next-door to the north at Roose, before the gas turbine station was decommissioned in 2014.

The topsides for the Morecambe Bay production, accommodation and flare platforms were designed by Matthew Hall Engineering which was also responsible for jacket design, construction assistance and installation technical assistance. It was awarded the contract in May 1981. The plant had a processing capacity of 34 million standard cubic metres per day. Electricity generation was powered by four 4 MW Ruston gas turbines. The topsides accommodation was for 176 people.

=== Rivers Terminal ===
It is named as it is because its fields are all named after Lancashire rivers. This is operated by Spirit Energy on behalf of Chrysaor (following the acquisition of ConocoPhillips UK assets in 2019). The £60m contract for the construction by Costain Oil and Gas Ltd (now called COGAP) of Manchester from January 2002. The whole £185m project, including the fields, was originally developed by Burlington Resources, who were bought by ConocoPhillips in 2006. The gas coming to the terminal is sour and contains high levels of nitrogen and hydrogen sulphide. Gas is transferred from here to the North Morecambe Terminal. Waste hydrogen sulphide is burned to produce sulphur dioxide and converted to liquid sulphuric acid which has industrial use.

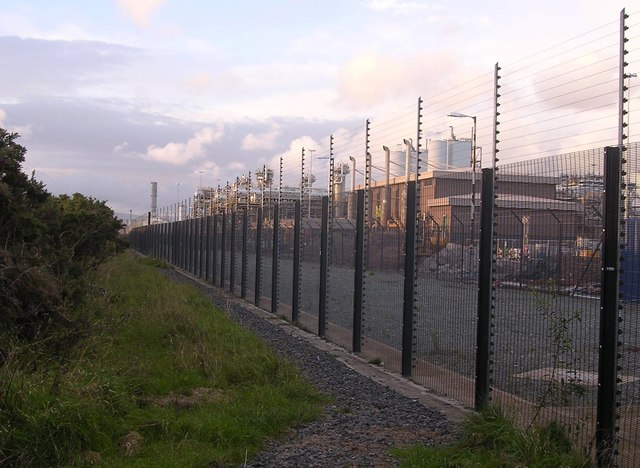
Perimeter fence

=== North Morecambe Terminal ===
Operated by Spirit Energy. Gas arriving here has a higher concentration of carbon dioxide and nitrogen than the South Morecambe plant, and hence has to be treated in different processes, and thus needs a separate plant. There is three phase separation and carbon dioxide is removed via an amine wash. Nitrogen is removed via a cryogenic distillation process

=== South Morecambe Terminal ===
Operated by Spirit Energy. It receives gas only from the South Morecambe field. First to begin production in 1985. Gas is compressed via two GE LM2500+ gas turbines and Vectra power turbines that drive gas compressers. South Morecambe Terminal went off line in 2015 / 2016 and was decommissioned in 2016. The terminal will be demolished in late 2017.

== Centrica gas fields ==
Operated by Hydrocarbon Resources Limited (HRL), owned by Centrica. These Centrica fields are some of the largest on the UK Continental Shelf, and produces enough gas to heat 1.5 million UK homes.

=== North Morecambe ===
Discovered in March 1976. Production started in October 1994. Both North and South Morecambe fields are about 25 miles west of Blackpool. This field does not have assigned workers and only has one platform.

=== South Morecambe ===
Discovered in September 1974. Production started in January 1985. Gas is transferred to the South Morecambe Terminal. The Central Processing Complex (CPC) is powered by four dual-fuel gas turbines, powered by the field's gas or low-sulphur diesel. There are five drilling platforms and the main accommodation platform is in the CPC. 80% of the total gas in the Morecambe Bay area is in this field.

=== Bains ===
Gas is transferred via the South Morecambe field.

== Chrysaor gas fields ==
Acquired by Chrysaor from ConocoPhillips in 2019. Formerly operated by HRL on behalf of ConocoPhillips. Also to include the Hodder (named after the River Hodder) and Asland (named after the River Asland) fields.

=== Millom and Dalton ===
Part of the Rivers project. Gas goes to the North Morecambe platform, where the fields are situated near to, then the North Morecambe terminal. Named after Millom and Dalton-in-Furness in Cumbria. Millom discovered in April 1982 with production starting in August 1999. Dalton discovered in April 1990 with production starting in August 1999.

=== Calder ===
Gas goes to the Rivers terminal. Named after the River Calder, Lancashire. Largest of the Rivers fields. Situated just south-west of the South Morecambe field. Discovered in February 1982.

=== Darwen and Crossens ===
Not in production. Gas will go to the Rivers terminal. Named after the River Darwen and River Crossens.

== See also ==
- Barrow Offshore Wind
