= Rampside Leading Light =

Lighthouse in Cumbria, England

Rampside Leading light Walney Channel Middle Range Rear
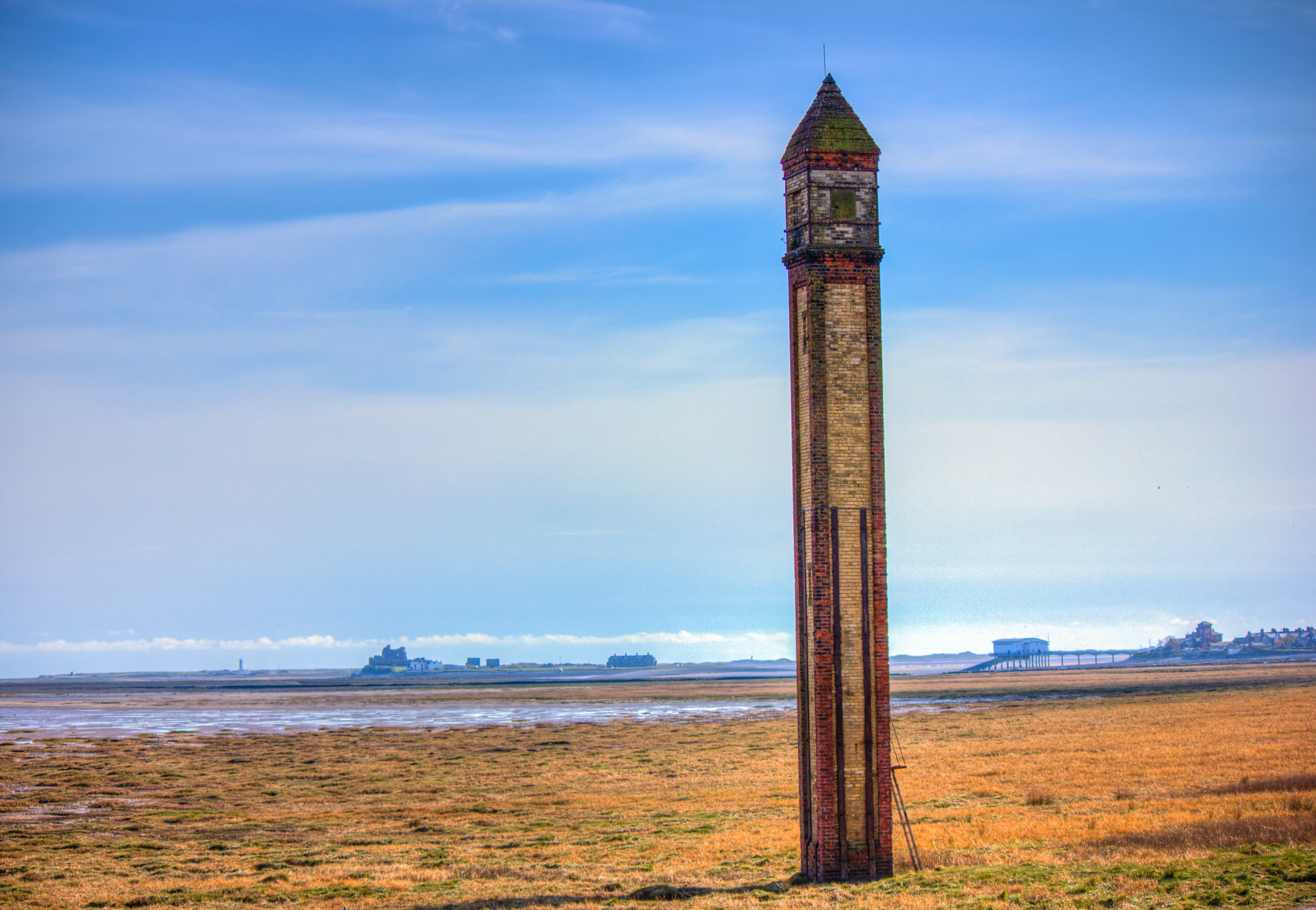
- Rampside Leading light in 2012. Piel Island can be seen in the distance at left
- Location: Rampside; Cumbria; England
- OS grid: SD2413966237
- Coordinates: 54.08644°N 3.16121°W

Tower
- Constructed: 1875
- Construction: brick
- Height: 16 m (52 ft)
- Shape: square obelisk with window near top for light
- Markings: red and yellow brick in vertical stripes
- Power source: mains electricity
- Operator: Port of Barrow
- Heritage: Grade II listed building

Light
- Focal height: 14 m (46 ft)
- Range: 14 nmi (26 km; 16 mi)
- Characteristic: Iso W 2s

'Rampside Leading Light, is a leading light (navigation beacon) located in the Rampside area of Barrow-in-Furness, Cumbria, England. Built in 1875, it is the only surviving example of 13 such beacons built around Barrow during the late 19th century to aid vessels into the town's port. It stands 20 metres (66 ft) tall and is constructed from red and yellow bricks. Rampside leading light was designated a Grade II listed building by English Heritage in 1991.

== See also ==
- Listed buildings in Barrow-in-Furness
- List of lighthouses in England
