= Rampside =

Village in Cumbria, England

Coordinates: 54.083°N 3.166°W

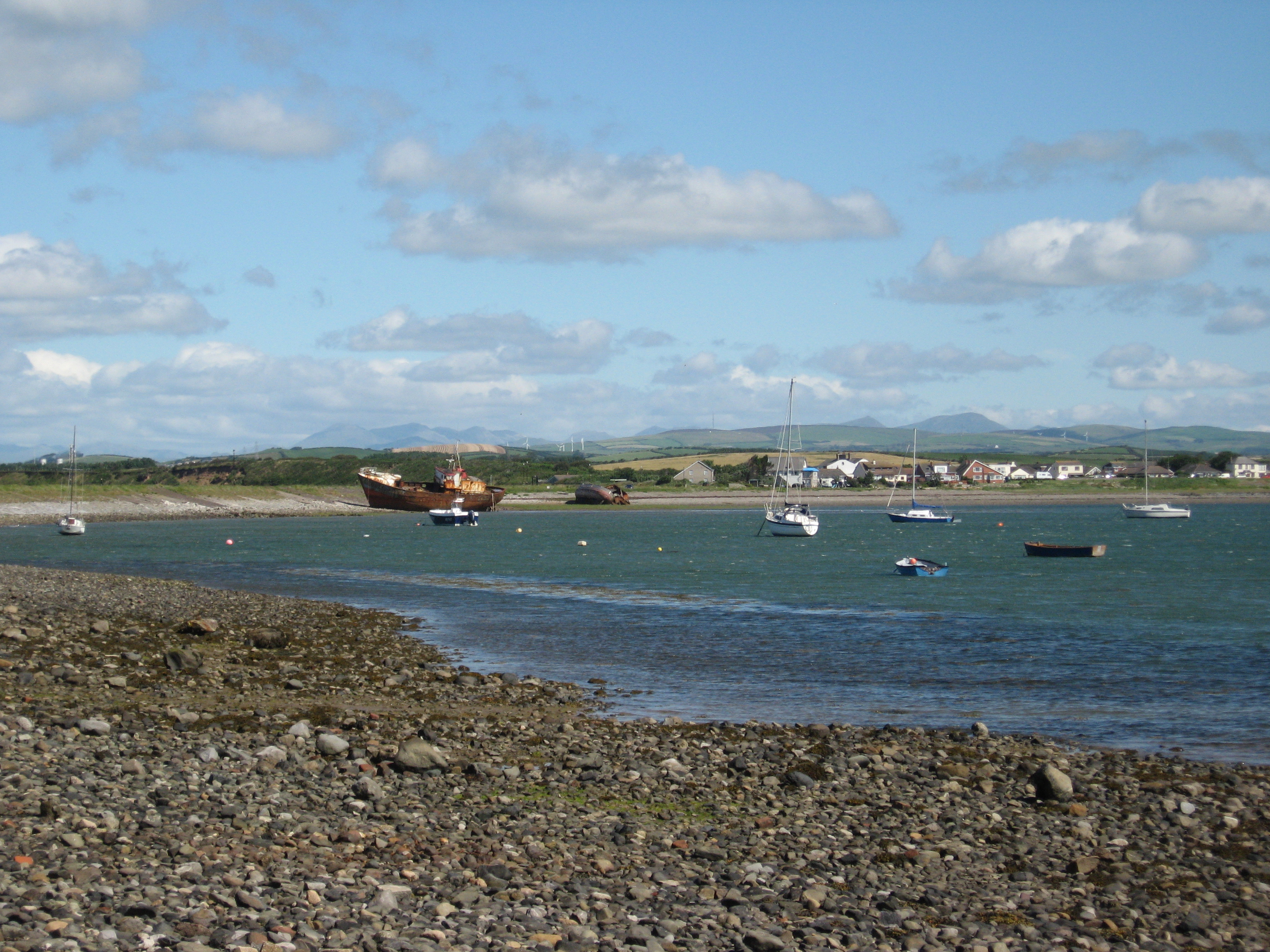
- Rampside on a summer's day

- Location in the former Borough of Barrow-in-Furness Location in Morecambe Bay Location within Cumbria
- OS grid reference: NY236659
- Unitary authority: Westmorland and Furness
- Ceremonial county: Cumbria
- Region: North West
- Country: England
- Sovereign state: United Kingdom
- Post town: BARROW-IN-FURNESS
- Postcode district: LA13
- Dialling code: 01229
- Police: Cumbria
- Fire: Cumbria
- Ambulance: North West
- UK Parliament: Barrow and Furness

Rampside is a village in Cumbria, England. Historically in Lancashire, it is located a few miles south-east of the town of Barrow-in-Furness, in the north-western corner of Morecambe Bay on the Furness peninsula.

== History ==
There is evidence that the village was inhabited as early as 1292, in the records of the monks of Furness Abbey, though Viking and Roman artefacts have been found in the village's church. As well as agriculture, the village acted as a small port, with shipping trade coming to Furness Abbey through Roa Island, which itself was defended by the fortified Piel Island, both around one mile south of Rampside.

Thomas Lawson, a herbalist and botanist, was born at Rampside in 1630 and became minister at the village church. He invited George Fox to preach from the pulpit after one Sunday service, and subsequently became a Quaker himself in 1653. He published various religious works and died in 1691.

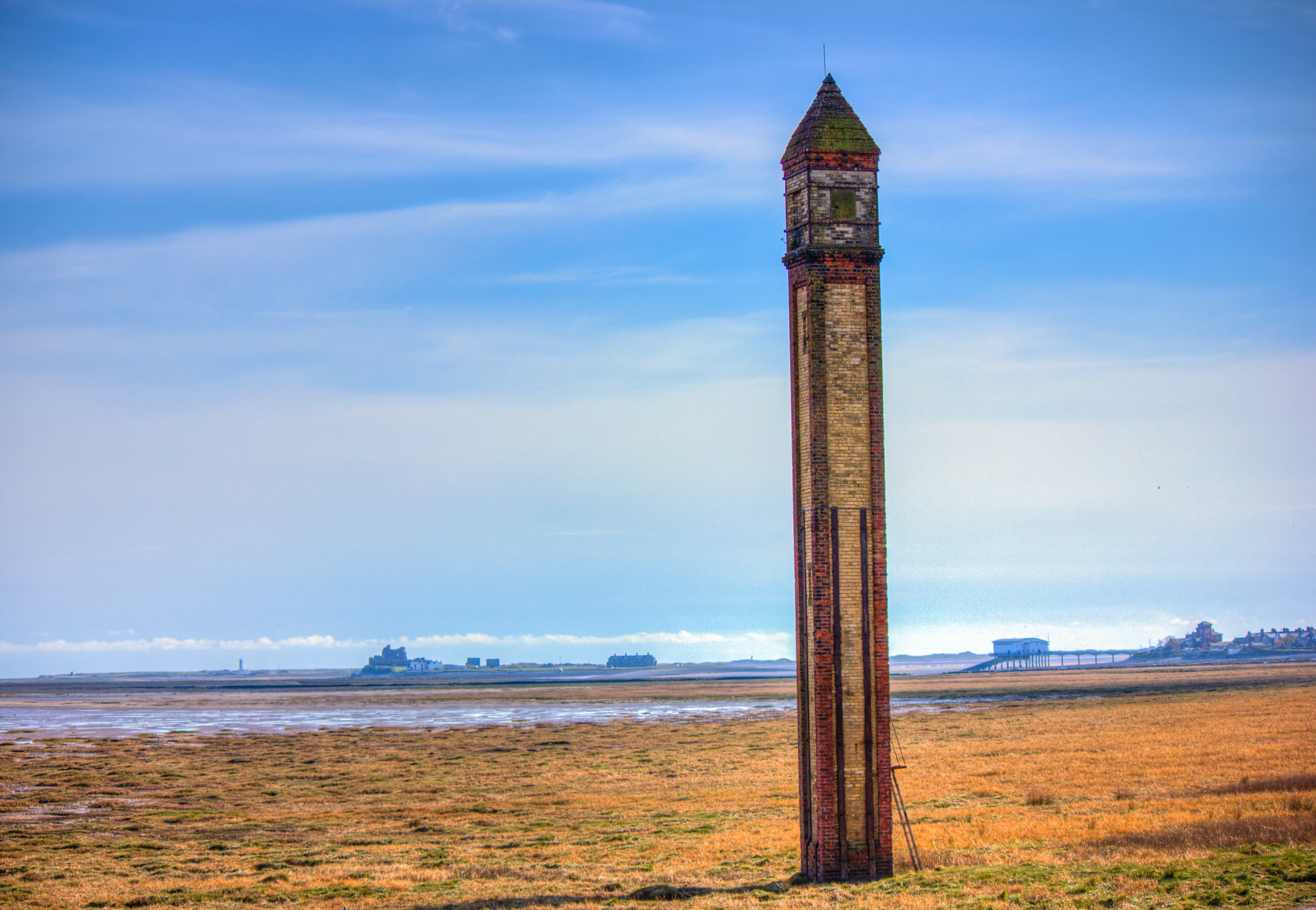
Rampside Leading Light, also known as The Needle, was built in the 19th century. Piel Castle can be seen in the distance at left.

In the late 18th century, the village had a reputation as a bathing resort; at the time, it was larger than Barrow-in-Furness, which was still a small hamlet. The poet, William Wordsworth, is known to have frequented the village at this time. His memory of his time at Rampside and his view towards Piel Castle led him to write the following in 1805:

'I was thy neighbour once, thou rugged Pile!
Four summer weeks I dwelt in sight of thee:
I saw thee every day, and all the while,
Thy form was sleeping on a glassy sea'

In 1840, development began on a causeway to Roa Island, resulting in a rail ferry from Fleetwood to the island, the trains then passing through Rampside Station to get to Barrow and the southern Lake District. This service became obsolete with the railway barges linking Ulverston and Lancaster, and the causeway soon became a road.

On 15 February 1865, a small shallow earthquake caused serious damage in Rampside. The intensity at Rampside has been estimated as VIII on the European macroseismic scale; the magnitude of the earthquake is uncertain, but probably not more than 3 M_{L}.

== Present day ==
In recent years, Roa Island and Rampside have retained their close links to the sea, with sailing and windsurfing popular in the surrounding waters.

Rampside is also home to the Rampside Gas Terminal and Roosecote Power Station, where gas from the Morecambe Bay and Irish Sea gasfields comes onshore. This, and commuting into Barrow, are the main sources of modern-day employment in Rampside.

== See also ==
- Rampside Hall
- Rampside Gas Terminal
- Rampside Lighthouse
