= Ramp Run =

Ramp Run is a stream located in Brown Township entirely within Miami County, Ohio.

Ramp Run was named for the ramp, a type of wild onion cultivated by Indians.

== See also ==
- List of rivers of Ohio
