= Roosecote Power Station =

Former power station in Cumbria, England

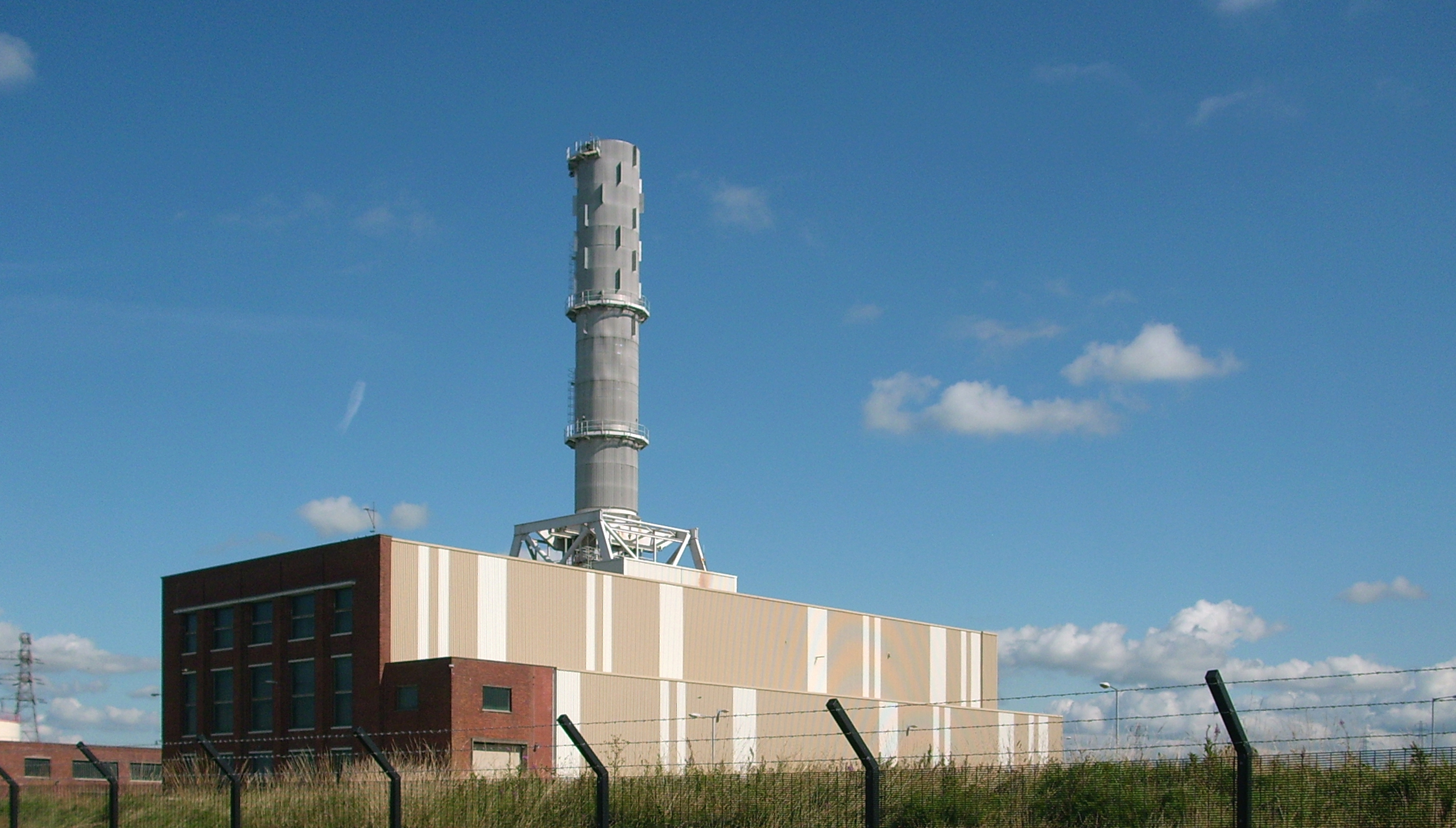
- Roosecote Power Station
- Country: England
- Location: Cumbria, North West England
- Coordinates: 54.10499°N 3.187732°W
- Status: Coal-fired and CCGT stations decommissioned and demolished, Battery facility operational
- Construction began: Coal-fired: Late 1940s CCGT: 1990; Battery: 2017
- Commission date: Coal-fired: 1953; CCGT: 1991; Battery: 2018
- Decommission date: Coal-fired: 1986; CCGT: 2012
- Owners: British Electricity Authority (1953–1955); Central Electricity Authority (1955–1957); Central Electricity Generating Board (1958–1986); Centrica (1991–present)
- Operator: As owner

Thermal power station
- Primary fuel: Coal-fired Coal, CCGT Natural gas
- Site area: 114.5 acres
- Chimneys: Coal-fired 2; CCGT 1
- Cooling source: Seawater

Power generation
- Units operational: Coal-fired 4 × 32 MW, CCGT 120 MW
- Nameplate capacity: 120 MW
- Annual net output: 331 GWh (1971), 144 GWh (1981)
- Storage capacity: 49 MW

External links
- Commons: Related media on Commons

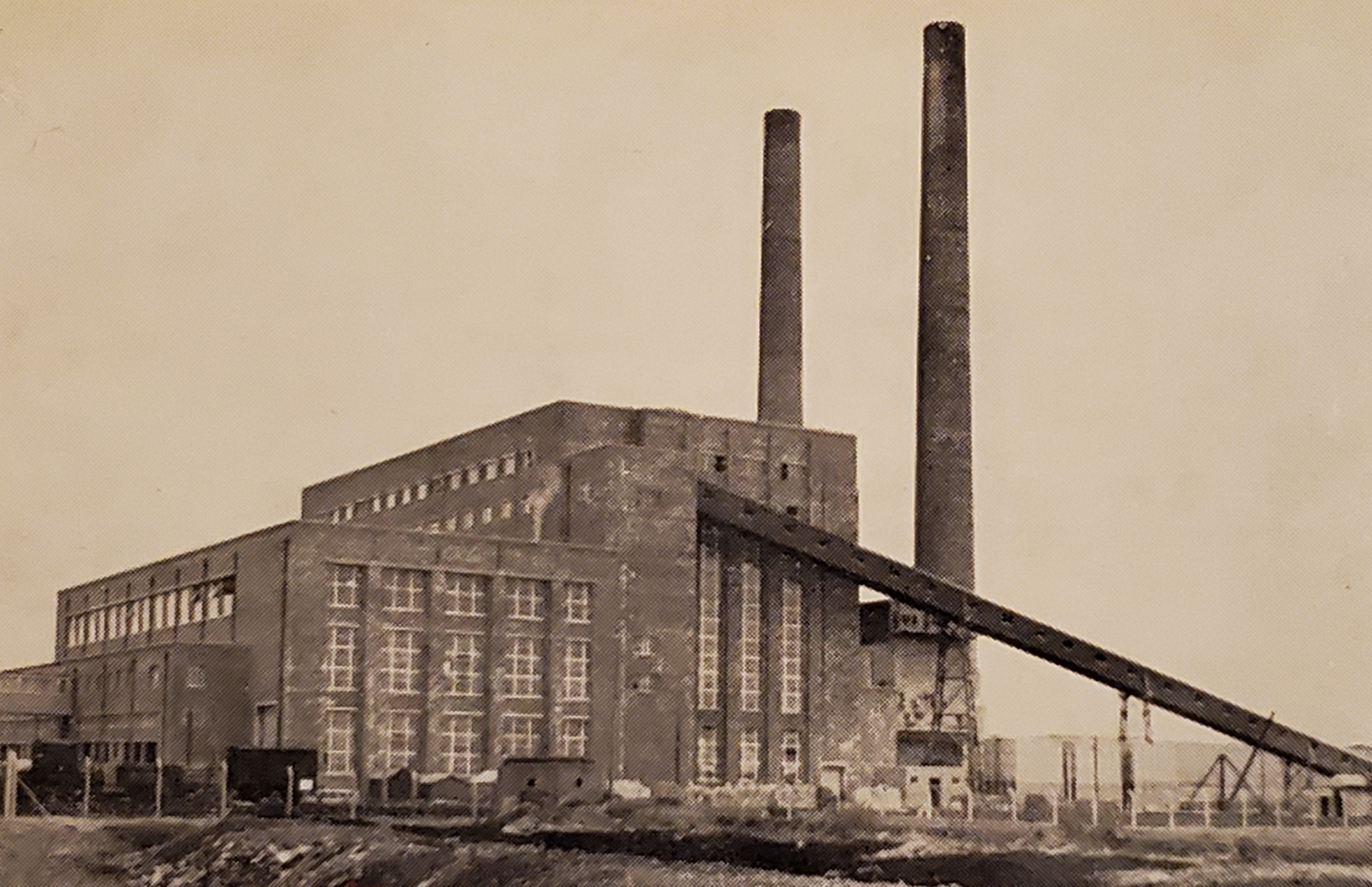
Roosecote Power Station 1955

Roosecote Power Station was a gas-fired, originally coal-fired power station, situated in the Roosecote district of Barrow-in-Furness in Cumbria, North West England. The gas-fired station opened in 1991 and was the first CCGT power station to supply electricity to the United Kingdom's National Grid, but was mothballed in 2012 after a proposed biomass power station was cancelled. It was situated directly adjacent to Rampside Gas Terminal. The plant was demolished between 2014 and 2015. The site is now a 49 MW battery storage facility.

== Coal-fired power station ==
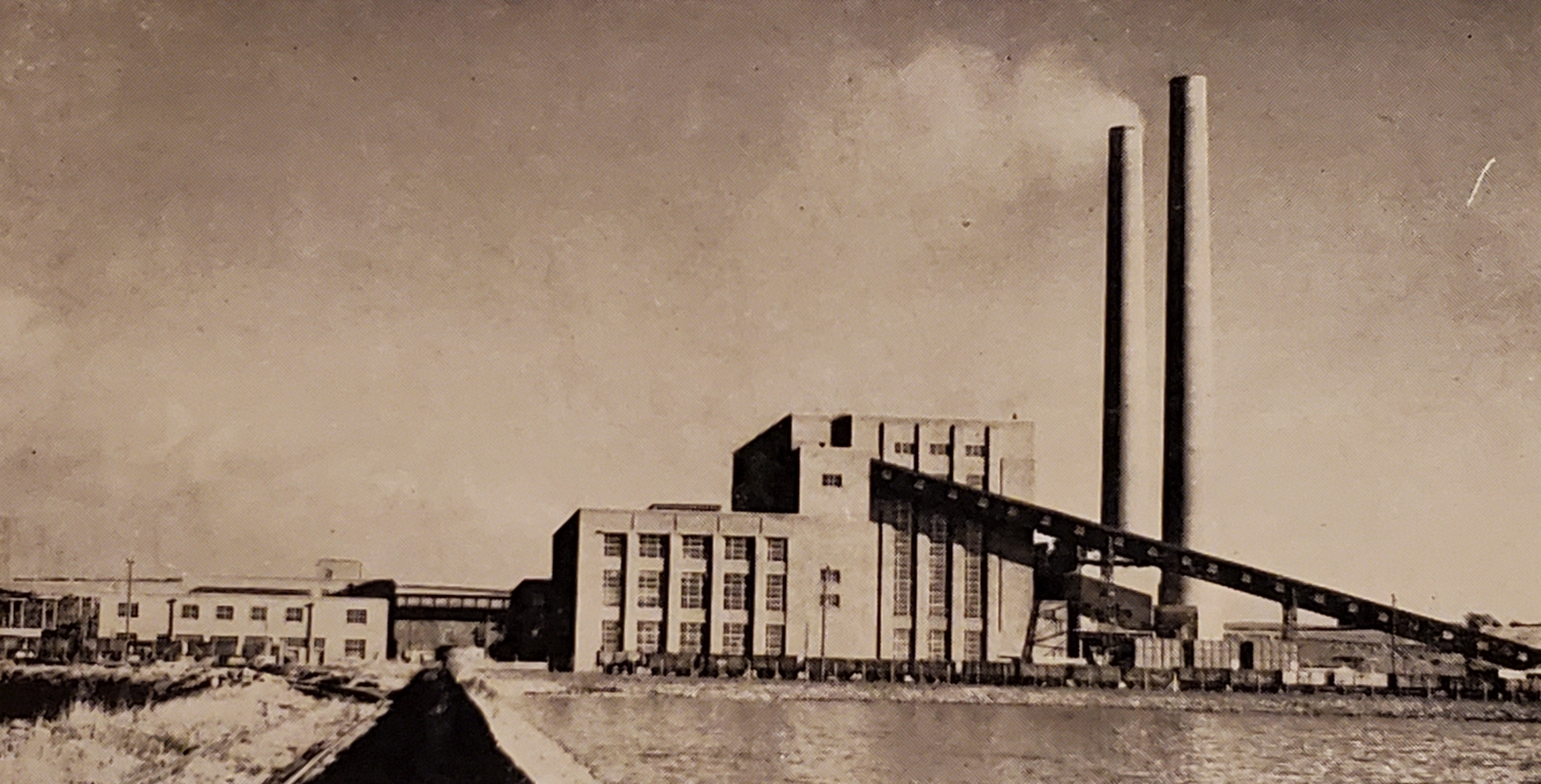
Roosecote Power Station from the West 1955

The coal-fired power station began generating electricity in September 1953. The station had a generating capacity of 120 megawatts (MW). This was from four 30 MW Metropolitan-Vickers turbo-alternators generating at 11.8 kV. The station was initially operated by the Central Electricity Authority, which became the Central Electricity Generating Board in 1957. The output from the station was:

Roosecote power station output, GWh
| Year | 1954 | 1955 | 1956 | 1957 | 1958 | 1961 | 1962 | 1963 | 1967 | 1972 | 1979 | 1982 |
|---|---|---|---|---|---|---|---|---|---|---|---|---|
| Output GWh | 82.7 | 344.2 | 443.7 | 422.8 | 263.6 | 301.15 | 265.79 | 298.68 | 416.7 | 330.8 | 256.6 | 144.32 |
| Thermal efficiency, % | 26.11 | 27.02 | 27.05 | 26.87 | 26.35 | 25.70 | 25.63 | 25.92 | 26.49 | 25.25 | 24.54 | 24.01 |

The four Yarrow boilers at Roosecote had a total steam generating capacity of 1.2 million pounds per hour (151.2 kg/s). The steam conditions were 600/625 psi and 865 °F (41.4 bar and 463 °C). Condensing of steam from the turbines was by seawater.

The station closed in November 1986. At the time of its closure only 60 MW of the station's capacity was in operation.

== CCGT power station ==
The first organisation to plan for a new power station on the site was Cumbria Power in 1987, formed of four engineers. They hoped to build a CCGT plant that used the steam turbines of the former plant. This idea wasn't feasible, so a new power station was chosen instead, but situated in the former turbine hall. ABB joined the planning process in April 1989, and a new company – Lakeland Power Ltd – was formed, being owned 80% by ABB and 20% by Cumbria Power. In October 1989, the North Western Electricity Board (NORWEB) signed an agreement with Lakeland Power to have a supply of electricity – the first such agreement between a UK regional electricity company and a private generator. NORWEB also bought 20% of the company.

Construction started on 3 January 1990, the construction work carried out by Alfred McAlpine and Stone & Webster. The station was commissioned on 20 November 1991, although officially opened on 1 November 1991 by John Wakeham. It had been the first Independent Power Project (IPP) since the privatisation of the UK electricity industry in 1990. Roosecote station marked the start of the "Dash for Gas" which saw many more CCGTs built in the UK, as gas became an alternative to coal power. This hastened the demise of Britain's coal industry. In 1997, the newly elected Labour government placed restrictions on the number of gas-fired power stations that could be built.

Roosecote was operated by ABB, though owned by Lakeland Power. ABB then sold its 60% stake of the company to California-based Edison Mission Energy (EME), who bought the rest of the company from NORWEB in October 1999. In December 2002, EME company went into receivership, due to the financial troubles of Texas-based TXU who had bought NORWEB's supply business, and the station was temporarily shut down. On 14 May 2003, the station was bought by Centrica Energy for £24 million. Centrica proposed building a new 80 MW biomass plant on the site but regulatory changes led to this being cancelled in October 2012. At the same time Centrica announced that Roosecote would be mothballed pending a final decision on the future of the site, which might include closure, redevelopment or sale as a going concern. In September 2014 Centrica Energy confirmed it had received planning permission to demolish Roosecote Power Station. The plant was no longer deemed economically viable due to the age and condition of the plant.

=== Specification ===
Prior to decommissioning, the station was a Combined cycle gas turbine power station, fueled by gas from Centrica's Morecambe Bay field which is landed at nearby Westfield Point. The station generated electricity using one 165 MWe Alstom GT13E gas turbine, its associated alternator having a terminal voltage of 15.75 kV, rated at 210MVA, from which the exhaust gases at 520C pass through one CMI heat recovery steam generator. Steam from this powers one 63 MWe steam turbine, with its alternator having a terminal voltage of 12.5 kV. The station had a thermal efficiency of 49%. The electricity generated entered the National Grid, via a transformer, at 132 kV, where it powered part of the United Utilities (former NORWEB) network. By March 2012 it was reconfigured to allow operation in the Short Term Operating Reserve market.

== Battery storage plant ==
In 2018 Centrica Business Solutions commissioned the 49 MW Roosecote battery storage facility. The battery helps to keep the electricity grid stable by either absorbing power from, or supplying power to, the grid and is able to come online in less than a second. Centrica Business Solutions is also expanding its own renewable energy network through the set up of Centrica Energy Assets, where land is leased for both solar farms and battery storage.
