= Ramp, West Virginia =

- Unincorporated community
- Location within West Virginia Location within the United States
- Coordinates: 37°45′01″N 80°49′22″W
- Country: United States
- State: West Virginia
- County: Summers
- Elevation: 1,762 ft (537 m)
- Time zone: UTC-5 (Eastern (EST))
  - Summer (DST): UTC-4 (EDT)
- Area codes: 304 & 681
- GNIS feature ID: 1555438

Ramp is an unincorporated community in Summers County, West Virginia, United States, located northeast of Hinton.

== History ==
A post office called Ramp was established in 1905, and remained in operation until it was discontinued in 1942. The community was named for the abundance of the ramp plant in the area.
