= Wharton, Cumbria =

Civil parish in Cumbria, England

Coordinates: 54.456°N 2.359°W

Wharton
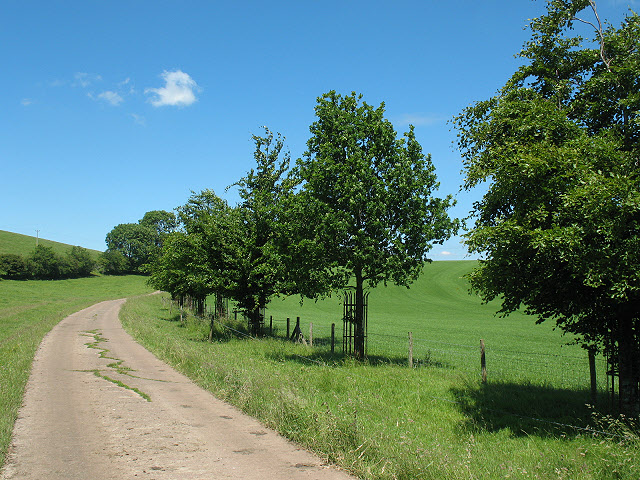
- The drive of Wharton Hall

- Location in former Eden District, Cumbria Location within Cumbria
- Population: 31 (2001)
- OS grid reference: NY7606
- Civil parish: Wharton
- Unitary authority: Westmorland and Furness
- Ceremonial county: Cumbria
- Region: North West
- Country: England
- Sovereign state: United Kingdom
- Post town: KIRKBY STEPHEN
- Postcode district: CA17
- Dialling code: 01768
- Police: Cumbria
- Fire: Cumbria
- Ambulance: North West
- UK Parliament: Westmorland and Lonsdale

Wharton is a civil parish near Kirkby Stephen in Westmorland and Furness, Cumbria, England. It was historically part of Westmorland. It has a population of 31. As the population taken at the 2011 Census remained less than 100 details are included in the parish of Mallerstang.

Wharton was historically a township in the ancient parish of Kirkby Stephen. It became a separate civil parish in 1866. It became part of Cumbria in 1974, and since 2016 has fallen within the Yorkshire Dales National Park.

The parish has a Grade I listed house called Wharton Hall and a castle called Lammerside Castle. Kirkby Stephen railway station is within the northern boundary of the parish.

== See also ==
- Listed buildings in Wharton, Cumbria
