= Parton, Cumbria =

Coordinates: 54.567°N 3.575°W

Parton
- Village and parish
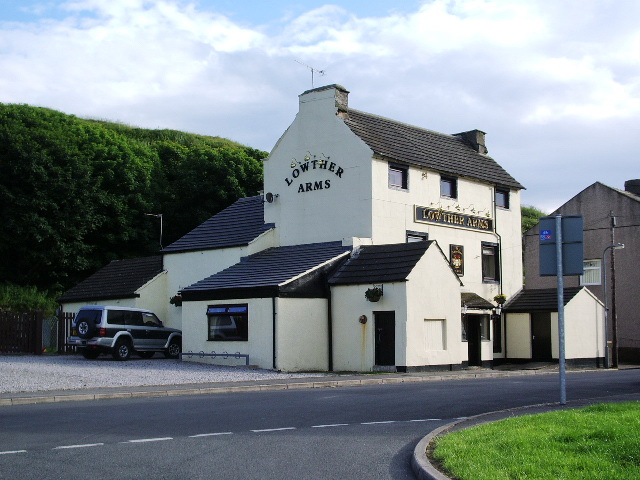
- Lowther Arms public house, Parton

- Location in the former Copeland Borough Location within Cumbria
- Population: 997 (2021)
- OS grid reference: NX979205
- Civil parish: Parton
- Unitary authority: Cumberland
- Ceremonial county: Cumbria
- Region: North West
- Country: England
- Sovereign state: United Kingdom
- Post town: WHITEHAVEN
- Postcode district: CA28
- Dialling code: 01946
- Police: Cumbria
- Fire: Cumbria
- Ambulance: North West
- UK Parliament: Whitehaven and Workington
- Website: https://partonparishcouncil.com/

Parton is a village and civil parish on the coast of Cumbria, overlooking the Solway Firth, approximately 2 miles (3 km) north of Whitehaven in England. At the 2021 census, the parish had a population of 997. Formerly a port and a mining centre, Parton is located on the A595 trunk road and the Cumbrian Coast railway line.

== History ==
=== Beginnings ===
Parton Harbour Act 1705
- Act of Parliament
- Parliament of England
- Long title: An Act for enlarging the Pier and Harbour of Parton, in the County of Cumberland.
- Citation: 4 & 5 Ann. c. 5 (Note: This is the citation in The Statutes of the Realm.); 4 Ann. c. 18 (Note: This is the citation in The Statutes at Large.)
- Territorial extent: England and Wales

Dates
- Royal assent: 19 March 1706
- Commencement: 1 May 1706 (Note: Section 1.)

Status: Current legislation

Text of statute as originally enacted

The sheltered anchorage in Parton Bay was used by the Romans, who had a fort (Gabrosentum) on the high ground to the north of the present village, beneath St Bridget's Church. The platform of the fort can still be seen today. Later, the bay was used by the inhabitants of Low Moresby (see Moresby Hall), the hamlet which grew up to the east of the old fort in the Middle Ages. In Elizabethan times a number of small merchant vessels were based in the bay, trading as far as Chester; by this time there was probably also a salt-pan in operation. The port was developed in the early 17th century to cater for Moresby's coal trade, but fell into decline after two generations of the Lowther family turned the hamlet of Whitehaven into a major port. Although the Lowthers theoretically had the legal power to prevent port development at Parton, entrepreneur Thomas Lamplugh teamed up with Henry Fletcher, lord of the manor of Moresby, to "repair" the harbour at Parton, following which Fletcher sold off plots for development along the shore. Within about five years (boosted by Lamplugh's act of Parliament, the Parton Harbour Act 1705 (4 & 5 Ann. c. 5), to break the Lowthers' legal power) a new port community had developed, mainly serving local collieries, but also including industrial facilities such as a glassworks – which was able to export bottles as far as London thanks to the improved harbour.

=== 18th century prosperity ===
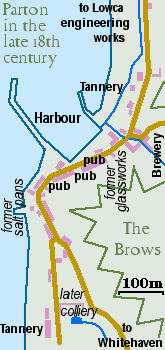
The original village

Unfortunately, Parton Bay is not as well sheltered as Whitehaven, and within about 15 years, Lamplugh was unable to afford maintenance costs (possibly a contributory factor to the closure of the glassworks and salt-pan about this time). The manor of Moresby was bought in 1722 by one Thomas Brougham, who was able to sideline Lamplugh and develop the port himself, but ironically, in 1738, he sold his rights to the Lowther family. Surprisingly, rather than shut down the port which rivalled Whitehaven, they used it themselves for some of their coal shipments, and Parton prospered for decades. New industries developed, most notably a brewery, but everything was nearly wrecked in 1795, when a storm destroyed the harbour breakwaters. With such extensive damage, the harbour reverted to being a little fishing haven, but the village industries had enough local custom to survive, for a while at least.

Surprisingly, a new and important industrial concern opened to the north of the village in 1800, the Lowca engineering company. In 1817, the large tannery at the south end of the village was bought for development as a colliery; the coal being mined some distance inland and brought to Parton along a tunnel called the Parton Drift, which also drained the mine workings. To convey coal to the port of Whitehaven a horse-drawn tramway was built along the foot of the cliffs.

=== 19th century onward ===
In 1840 the Lowca engineering works of Tulk and Ley made the first locomotive for the new Maryport and Carlisle Railway, but ironically, it had to be transported from Parton by seagoing barge. Not until several years later was the technically challenging railway extension to Whitehaven via Parton developed. The railway soon supplanted the old tramway, and brought new opportunities for Parton's industries. The colliery, the engineering works and the brewery all thrived, an iron-foundry opened next to the new railway station, and in the 1870s an ironworks was established on the shore near the Lowca works. Unfortunately, the end of the 19th century was a period of industrial consolidation, and Parton's relatively small businesses began to struggle.

By the 1920s, almost all were gone, and Parton became a dormitory town for collieries around Lowca and Whitehaven. Many of the houses in the old village were over 200 years old by this time, and were classified as slums, so over the next half-century new housing estates were developed on top of the Brows- the escarpment overlooking the old port. Although the local collieries have all closed, Parton's dormitory function continues, thanks to its good transport access. Moresby Hall and parish church remain, just outside the village boundary, on the high ground to the north of Parton.

== Governance ==
Parton is within the Whitehaven and Workington UK Parliamentary constituency.

The village also has its own Parish Council; Parton Parish Council,

== Gallery ==
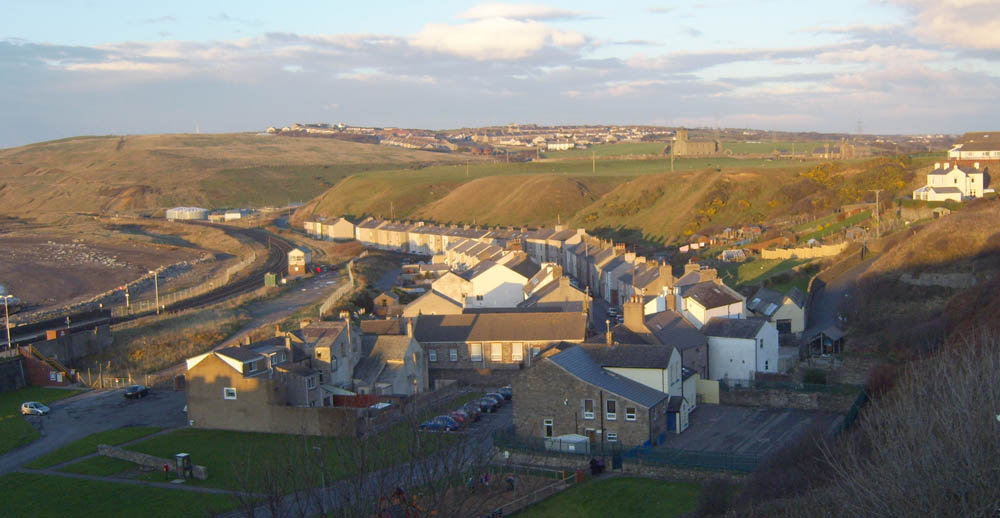
The north of Parton, with the site of the former harbour (now a green space) at bottom left, 20th century development on the hill at right, and Lowca village on the hills in the distance.

== See also ==
- Listed buildings in Parton, Cumbria
