= Rampside Hall =

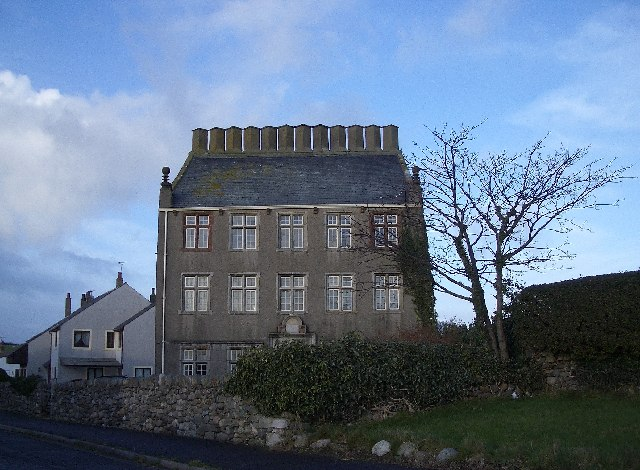
- Rampside Hall in 2005

- Location in Cumbria
- 54.0871°N 3.1621°W
- Location: Hall Garth, Rampside, Roose, Barrow-in-Furness, Cumbria

History
- Built: 17th Century

Listed Building – Grade I
- Designated: 10 November 1949
- Reference no.: 1197852

Rampside Hall is a Grade I listed building in the Rampside area of Barrow-in-Furness, Cumbria, England. It is one of only three Grade I listed buildings in the Borough outside of the Furness Abbey complex and dates back to the 17th century. Built for the Knype family, it is most noted for its dozen chimneys which have given the building the nickname 'the twelve apostles'. Rampside Hall retains the majority of its original features, with the only major alteration taking place in 1810 when the building was re-roofed. The building was heavily damaged on 15 February 1865 when a 2.2M_{L} earthquake shook the area, toppling three of its famed chimneys, cracking walls and displacing some of them by eight inches.

There is evidence of a house on the Rampside Hall site since 1634, however the precise date of construction for the present building is thought to be in the late 17th century. Rampside Hall is three storeys in height excluding the attic, and is of a 5 bay, double-depth plan. Some important original features noted by Historic England include a well in the building's cellar as well as a large staircase rising through all three floors, with oak balustrades and handrails.

== See also ==
- Grade I listed buildings in Cumbria
- Listed buildings in Barrow-in-Furness
