= Branthwaite Hall =

- Cumbria, England
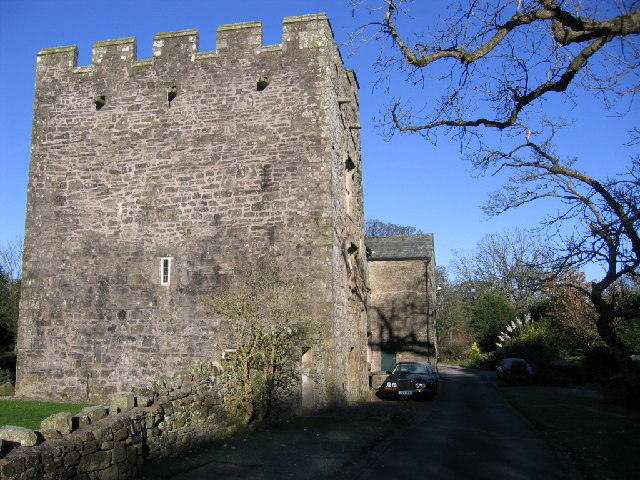
- Pele tower

Site information
- Type: Pele tower
- Condition: Intact

Location
- Shown within Cumbria
- Coordinates: 54.6142°N 3.4493°W
- Grid reference: grid reference NY065253

Site history
- Materials: Rubble masonry

Garrison information
- Designations: Grade I listed building

Branthwaite Hall is pele tower in Cumbria, England, considered by historian Anthony Emery to be "one of the best-preserved early houses in Cumbria".

== History ==
Branthwaite Hall was built near the village of Branthwaite and the town of Cockermouth in the mid-15th century by the Skelton family, who acquired the surrounding manor from the Branthwaites by marriage. The new building was constructed from rubble stone with a single tower with a parapet and a spiral-stair turret, with an adjacent hall. The hall was 60 feet long and 42 wide (18 metres by 13 metres), but was largely remodelled in 1604; the new hall is a single space, whereas it was probably originally subdivided, and additional windows were added. Subsequent work was conducted in the 1670s to give the property a grander appearance. The Skeltons held the hall until 1757.

It was designated as a Grade I listed building in 1967.

== Today ==
Branthwaite Hall was restored between 1985 and 1986 by the National Coal Board, which converted the property into offices. It is considered by historian Anthony Emery to be "one of the best-preserved early houses in Cumbria".

== See also ==
- Castles in Great Britain and Ireland
- List of castles in England

== Bibliography ==
- Emery, Anthony. (1996) Greater Medieval Houses of England and Wales, 1300–1500: Northern England. Cambridge: Cambridge University Press. ISBN 978-0-521-49723-7.
- Pettifer, Adrian. (2002) English Castles: a Guide by Counties. Woodbridge, UK: Boydell Press. ISBN 978-0-85115-782-5.
