= Lammerside Castle =

Motte-and-bailey castle in the East Riding of Yorkshire, England

- Cumbria, England
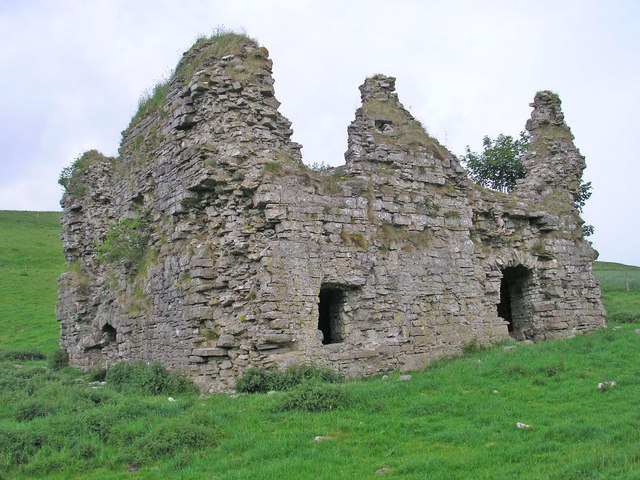
- Lammerside Castle in 2006

Site information
- Type: Tower house
- Open to the public: yes
- Condition: Ruins

Location
- Shown within Cumbria
- Coordinates: 54.43787°N 2.3521°W
- Grid reference: grid reference NY7716504789

Site history
- Built: 12th or 13th century
- Built by: Warcop family
- Materials: Rubble
- Demolished: 17th century

Lammerside Castle is a Grade II listed Medieval tower house in Wharton, Cumbria, England which has partial ruins existing today.

== History ==
The earliest Lammerside Castle was constructed as a tower house during the 12th or 13th century by the Warcop family, and the surviving structure was converted into a pele tower using rubble during the 14th century (possibly to defend against the Scots), probably after 1403 as John de Lambyrsete did not yet have a property to his name. It was almost certainly, however, owned by Thomas Warcop in 1404.

By 1576, the area around Lammerside Castle had been enclosed by the neighbouring Wharton family to form the Wharton Hall deer park, and it was abandoned during this time when the Wharton family moved to Wharton Hall. The north and south wings were demolished shortly after it was abandoned.

Lammerside Castle was Grade II listed on 1 October 1981.

== Description ==
The surviving ruins belong to a tower which constituted a section of the central core of Lammerside Castle, and the surrounding earthworks of the wings, barmkin wall, yard, and a building platform also survive.

The tower consists of two storeys connected by a newel staircase. The lower floor, covered by barrel vaults, was divided by a cross wall and the southern section had three apartments; a corridor was present and it ran north to south. The upper floor had a single room with a fireplace, and the local lord probably lived there.

Towards the eastern end of the north wall, the stump of the wall of a now demolished adjoining building has survived, and earthworks suggest the layout of the adjoining wings.
