= Wilfrid Lawson =

Wilfrid Lawson may refer to:

- Sir Wilfrid Lawson, 1st Baronet, of Isell (c. 1610–1688), MP for Cumberland 1659 and 1660 and Cockermouth 1660–1679
- Sir Wilfrid Lawson, 2nd Baronet, of Isell (1664–1704), MP for Cockermouth 1690–1695
- Sir Wilfrid Lawson, 3rd Baronet, of Isell (1697–1737), MP for Boroughbridge 1718–1722 and Cockermouth 1722–1737
- Sir Wilfrid Lawson, 4th Baronet (c. 1732–1739)
- Sir Wilfrid Lawson, 8th Baronet (c. 1707–1762), MP for Cumberland 1761–1762
- Sir Wilfrid Lawson, 10th Baronet (c. 1764–1806)
- Wilfrid Lawson (MP for Cockermouth) (c. 1636–? – c. 1679), High Sheriff 1678. Of Brayton
- Sir Wilfrid Lawson, 1st Baronet, of Brayton (1795–1867)
- Sir Wilfrid Lawson, 2nd Baronet, of Brayton (1829–1906), his son, British Liberal Party politician
- Sir Wilfrid Lawson, 3rd Baronet, of Brayton (1862–1937), his son, also a Liberal Party politician and MP
- Wilfred Lawson (died 1632) (1545–1632), English MP for Cumberland at various times between 1593 and 1621
- Wilfrid Lawson (actor) (1900–1966), British character actor

== See also ==
- Wilfred (given name)
- Sir Wilfrid Lawson, 3rd Baronet (disambiguation)
- Sir Wilfrid Lawson, 2nd Baronet (disambiguation)
- Sir Wilfrid Lawson, 1st Baronet (disambiguation)
