= Lawson baronets of Isell (1688) =

Escutcheon of the Lawson baronets of Isell

The Lawson baronetcy, of Isell in the County of Cumberland, was created in the Baronetage of England on 31 March 1688 for Wilfrid Lawson. He had been a Member of Parliament for Cumberland and Cockermouth in 1659, 1660 and 1661.

The 2nd, 3rd, 6th and 8th Baronets were also Members of Parliament. The title became extinct on the death of the 10th Baronet in 1806.

The Lawson baronets of Brayton (1831) descended from the sister of the 10th Baronet.

== Lawson baronets, of Isell (1688) ==
- Sir Wilfrid Lawson, 1st Baronet (c. 1610–1688)
- Sir Wilfrid Lawson, 2nd Baronet (1664–1704)
- Sir Wilfrid Lawson, 3rd Baronet (1697–1737)
- Sir Wilfrid Lawson, 4th Baronet (c. 1732–1739)
- Sir Mordaunt Lawson, 5th Baronet (c. 1733–1743)
- Sir Gilfrid Lawson, 6th Baronet (1675–1749)
- Sir Alfred Lawson, 7th Baronet (died 1752)
- Sir Wilfrid Lawson, 8th Baronet (c. 1707–1762)
- Sir Gilfrid Lawson, 9th Baronet (c. 1710–1794)
- Sir Wilfrid Lawson, 10th Baronet (c. 1764–1806)
