= Isel Hall =

Ancient Cumbrian residence

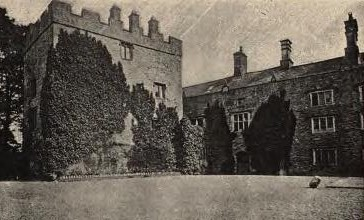
- Isel Hall

- Location within Cumbria
- 54°41′28″N 3°18′26″W
- Type: Tower House and Manor House
- Location: Isel

Site notes
- Area: Cumbria
- Architectural styles: Medieval and Tudor

Listed Building – Grade I
- Official name: Isel Hall
- Designated: 3 March 1967
- Reference no.: 1137970

Isel Hall is an ancient Cumbrian residence that sits on a steep rise on the northern banks of the River Derwent, two miles (3.2 km) south of Bassenthwaite Lake, three miles (4.8 km) east-north-east of Cockermouth, with views over the Lake District fells and Skiddaw. It was once the home of the Lawson family and is a Grade I listed building.

== History ==
=== Norman period ===
The recorded history of Isel begins during the reign of Henry II when Alan, the son of Waltheof, granted Randulph d'Engayne the demesnes of Ishall, Redmain and Blencrake. Randulph's granddaughter and heiress Ada married Simon de Morville, lord of the barony of Burgh by Sands, whose son Hugh left two daughters as coheirs, Ada and Joan. The manor of Isel fell to the elder sister's share. Ada married Richard de Lucy of Egremont; and later Thomas de Multon, to whom she had a son and heir, Thomas. In the reign of Henry III this Thomas, entailed Isel and Blencrake on his younger son Hubert. Hubert Moulton enjoyed Isel for his lifetime, after which his son William entered the story.

=== The Leigh connection ===
In 1315, William's daughter Margaret married Sir William de Leigh and this brought Isel into the Leigh family for a period stretching from the reign of Edward II (1307–1327) until 1572. William died in 1354, leaving five sons and two daughters; he is buried beside his horse in Isel churchyard. In the year 1499, one Robert Leigh of Isel assisted Elizabeth Dykes to prosecute an appeal against Thomas Curwen and others for the murder of her husband Alexander Dykes. The award made by Richard Redmain, bishop of Exeter; Master Christopher Urswyk, archdeacon of Richmond; Edward Redmain and Sir Thomas Dykes; stated that:-

“whereas the said parties were nigh of blood the said Elizabeth should no longer sue her appeal, but that the said Thomas Curwen and his partakers shall shew themselves meekly sorry for his death, and shall pay to the said Elizabeth four score pounds of lawful money, and further find one honest priest to sing for the soul of the said Alexander, in the church at Isel, by the space of two years, paying yearly for his salary seven marks of lawful money.”

In 1509, one Sir Edward Redmain possessed Isel, having married, in 1485, the lady Elizabeth, widow of Sir Thomas Leigh, and daughter of Sir John Huddlestone of Millom. Elizabeth died in 1529, leaving Isel to Sir John Leigh. The Patent Rolls for 1530 confirm the title. In 1544 John Leigh held the manor of Isel and Blencrake of the King by the service of one knight's fee and the cornage of 46s. 8d. (£2 33p). He was High Sheriff of Cumberland in 1548 and again in 1557; he died in 1563. Thomas Leigh, the last of the name, gave Isel to his second wife, Maud Redmain, who afterwards married for her third husband Wilfred Lawson, who conveyed the inheritance over to him.

=== The Lawson era ===
The Lawsons can trace their descent to John Lawson, lord of Fawkegrave, Yorkshire to the early part of the 13th century. Through a long line of eminent ancestors we arrive at Sir Wilfrid Lawson (1545–1632), son of Thomas Lawson (died 1559) of Little Usworth, County Durham, and his wife Elizabeth Darrell, daughter of Constantine Darrell of Wiltshire. He was educated at Trinity College, Cambridge in 1562 and at Gray's Inn in 1564. In 1591 the Earl of Northumberland made him Lieutenant of the Honour of Cockermouth (Grand Steward of all his estates) and the Conveyor of the Commissioners of the Marches. He was High Sheriff of Cumberland in 1583. In 1593 he was elected Member of Parliament for Cumberland. He was High Sheriff of Cumberland again in 1597. In 1604, he was elected MP for Cumberland again. He was knighted in 1604 and in 1605 was appointed convener to the royal commission set up to govern the Anglo-Scottish border. He was High Sheriff again in 1606 and in 1612. In 1614 he was elected MP for Cumberland again. Lawson died childless in 1632 at the age of 87 years and was succeeded by his great nephew Sir Wilfrid Lawson, 1st Baronet, of Isell.

Sir Wilfred Lawson was an English landowner and politician who sat in the House of Commons from 1660 to 1679. Lawson was born in 1610, the son of William Lawson, and his wife Judith Bewley, daughter of William Bewley of Hesket. He matriculated at Queen's College, Oxford on 21 November 1628, aged 17. He was knighted by Charles I on 28 February 1641. In 1688, shortly before his death he purchased a baronets patent from James II. He also purchased Brayton from the Salkeld family and settled the family estate at Isel on his grandson Wilfrid (son of his first son William), who subsequently became Sir Wilfrid Lawson, 2nd Baronet; and to Wilfrid his second son he conferred the estate of Brayton, so founding the line of 'Brayton' Lawsons.

Sir Wilfrid Lawson, 2nd Baronet (31 October 1664 – November 1704) was an English politician. He was the son of William Lawson and inherited his title on the death of his grandfather Sir Wilfrid Lawson, 1st Baronet, of Isell in 1688. He married Elizabeth daughter and heir to George Preston of Holker Hall, Lancashire. They had three sons; Wilfrid, William and John. Lawson was High Sheriff of Cumberland in 1689, and elected to represent Cockermouth in 1690. On 11 November 1704, Lawson died. He was succeeded by his eldest son Sir Wilfrid Lawson, 3rd Baronet, of Isell.

Sir Wilfrid Lawson, 3rd Baronet, of Isell FRS (1697 – 13 July 1737), was a British politician. He was educated Queen's College, Oxford, graduating in 1713; and was admitted to the Inner Temple in 1715. He was Groom of the Bedchamber to George I from 1720 to 1725; and was elected as Fellow of the Royal Society in 1718. He married Elizabeth Lucy, daughter of the Hon. Harry Mordaunt MP and niece of the Earl of Peterborough. The marriage produced two sons Wilfrid and Mordaunt and two daughters Elizabeth and Charlotte. He was one of the Lawson Baronets, the son and heir of Sir Wilfrid Lawson, 2nd Baronet, of Isell. In 1718, Lawson became Member of Parliament for the Boroughbridge constituency. In 1722, Lawson was returned for Cockermouth, which he represented until his death. Upon his death at Newcastle-upon-Tyne in 1737, he was succeeded by his eldest son, Sir Wilfrid Lawson, 4th Baronet (1731–39). However, he died in infancy. He was succeeded by his brother Sir Mordaunt Lawson, 5th Baronet (1735–43) who also died in infancy; so ending the supremacy of the Isel Lawson's.

The residency at Isel after 1743, becomes rather sketchy. We can, with a degree of confidence, assume that branches of the Lawson family continued to live there until the arrival of the Wybergh family in 1806. After this date various members of the Wybergh family are recorded. In 1856, William Wybergh of Isel Hall died; the new owner was his brother John, who in turn was followed by his son, also called John. At the time of her Royal highness the Princess Louise and her husband the Marquis of Lorne stayed at Isel on their way to open a bazaar at Carlisle in aid of the Cumberland Infirmary in September 1877, they were the guests of Percy S Wyndham MP. In 1891 Sir Wilfrid Lawson, 3rd Baronet, of Brayton (21 October 1862 – 28 August 1937), an English Liberal politician who sat in the House of Commons from 1910 to 1916 took over the estate. He remained at Isel until his death in 1937, when he was succeeded by his nephew Sir Hilton Lawson, 4th Baronet.

=== Modern day ===
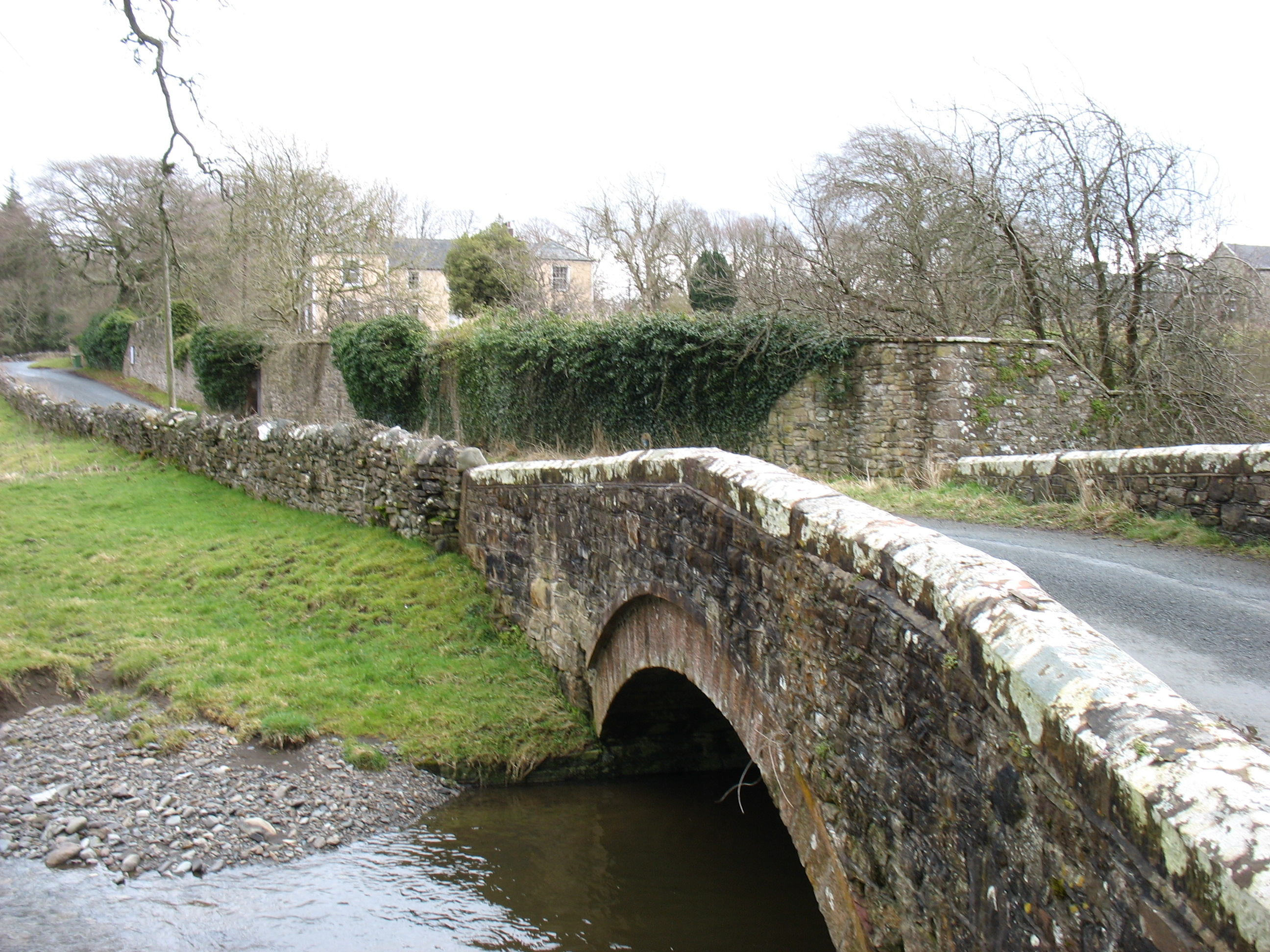
Isel Hall by the Blumer Beck

After the death of Sir Hilton Lawson, 4th Baronet, Isel Hall was sold by private sale to Margaret Austen-Leigh of Fareham, Hampshire, a first cousin of the previous owner. Margaret was the daughter of Lucy Thruston and granddaughter to Sir Wilfrid Lawson, 2nd Baronet, of Brayton. In 1941, Margaret married as his second wife Richard Austen-Leigh, the great nephew of Jane Austen. He was a publisher, printer and writer, who had revised the edited works of Jane Austen; he died in 1961. During Margaret's time at Isel she bred Shetland ponies and large poodle dogs.

Margaret had no children and upon her death in 1986 she left Isel to her friend and distant relative Mary Burkett OBE. Mary had recently retired from a distinguished career as director of Abbot Hall Art gallery and Museum, Kendal. At Abbot Hall she won the first award for Best museum of the Year, had served on committees of the Arts Council and Crafts Council and served as member of a visiting team of Museum Directors who had visited the United States in 1981 in an advisory role. Mary compiled a memoir of a former parlour maid at Isel Hall, Miss May Moore (I Was Only A Maid – the life of a remarkable woman, Firpress Ltd., Workington), who also featured in a Border TV documentary filmed at the Hall in 1997. Mary carried out, with the help of English Heritage many improvements to the fabric of the building, with special attention to the Pele Tower, the terrace and the sunken garden. Miss Burkett passed away in late 2014, leaving the house to its current owners.

== The Site ==
The edifice stands on a curious, almost unique, site on the north side of the River Derwent. Such a position at first sight appears contrary to all precedents, for whenever there is a stream in the vicinity we invariably find an English Pele tower placed on the southern bank, so as to interpose the river between it and the northern enemy. However, the geography of the region today is somewhat different from that of the medieval period. There existed at that time a dense impenetrable forest between Isel, Uldale and Wigton with no roads through for the marauding Scots to descend. Their only way would be by the old Roman road from Carlisle and Wigton to Cockermouth, or else by galleys from Dumfries to Allonby or Flimby, and then up the Derwent valley. Isel, therefore could only be reached from the south, hence the Hall is situated in the correct position. The site is further protected by a woodland stream running around the north and the west sides. It is called the Bloomer Beck, which suggests that it may have been the site a forge or iron smelter.

== Description ==
=== Pele tower ===
The most striking feature of Isel Hall is the Pele Tower, which together with the Great Hall is one of the oldest parts of the building. The exact age remains unclear. We know that in the year 1387 an army of Scots under the banners of the dukes of Douglas and Fife raided and captured Cockermouth Castle, and laid waste to the surrounding countryside. The present building most probably dates to a time shortly after this occurrence. Unfortunately there are no records to authenticate the date of erection of the Pele Tower. Although both the Crown and the Warden of the Marches granted such licenses, no public records relating to the proceedings of the latter are available for collaboration. There is however one architectural feature to offer a clue to the period. This is a Carnarvon arched doorway in the basement of the tower. It is a wide doorway writes Curwen, so it could be a late example and places the tower in the early fifteenth century. The tower consists of the customary vaulted basement with three stories over. It is rectangular shaped and of medium size, measuring externally 13 metres by 7.75 metres on a north–south axis. The masonry is of freestone rubble with red sandstone dressings to the sixteenth century windows. There is no plinth or offset of any kind, although the parapet ejects beyond the face of the wall. The height is 13 metres and the walls are 2 metres thick. The basement is barrel vaulted, and divided by a cross wall, in which is the previously mentioned Carnarvon arched doorway. The three floors above are reached by short flights of stairs and passages. On the top floor are two light windows with square heads and drip stones in common with the period of Henry VIII. To this tower, but not in axis, the owner added a domestic range. This addition has no windows.

=== The Grand Hall ===
The later wing, also started in the 16th century, protruding in a westerly direction, is about 38 metres in length. It has a gable-roof and a plain parapet relieved on both fronts at intervals by small open stone arches surmounted by short pinnacles and having the form of a prick spur. The wing is lighted by rows of square mullioned windows which have red sandstone dressed quoins, and above the windows over the doorway is a square tablet enclosing a weather-worn coat of arms. Projecting from this wing was a further wing, now gone, balancing the Pele Tower to form an open courtyard.

The owner built the earliest part of this extended wing in the early part of the 16th century; it comprised a banqueting hall, looking towards the south, together with a new entrance hall with bedrooms over. The banqueting hall, occupied the space of the present dining room, study, and passage, and measured 12.2 metres by 7.3 metres. Four very wide and richly moulded beams span the ceiling, while laid across these are smaller moulded ribs to support the above floors. The beautiful Tudor panelling surrounding this block of rooms is one of the most interesting features of the hall. We find the Lawson arms, inlaid, above the doorway of the present study; while the adjoining panels are ornamented in colour with different devices and figures.

=== The Façade ===
The façade of the Hall is another peculiar feature which calls for attention. The line of the eaves is broken at regular intervals by a form of ornament superimposed upon the top of the wall and of which only one parallel example exists, that is at Hardwick Hall in Derbyshire. The principal ornament consists of an open arch rib with the feet sunk lightly below the eaves but which rise up clear of the slates being surmounted on the crown by a terminal. At intermediate distances somewhat smaller ones occur, but in these the arch is not pierced, neither do the feet penetrate into the wall.

== Sale of interior property ==
In July 1960 the auctioneers erected an enormous marquee on the terrace lawn outside of the front door of Isel Hall, overlooking the River Derwent. The three-day sale, comprising 1,071 lots, filled 30 pages of the sale catalogue. There were 20 lots of metal ware, 37 of plated ware, 109 of silver, 264 of furniture, 34 of carpets and rugs, 66 of china and glass, and many more of paintings, curtains, books and linen. One may gain an understanding of the work of the linen maids in the great country houses by studying the content of the catalogue. Almost 300 lots of linen came under the hammer, including 31 tablecloths, 60 linen sheets, 90 table napkins, and over 200 towels.

Although dealers attended from all over the country and from abroad the majority of the items went to local people. The highest price paid was £300 for an inlaid mahogany Hepplewhite break front bookcase, the top enclosed by two central and two side astragal glass doors. Other interesting prices are:- £10, a pair of Georgian salt cellars with spoons; £32, a Georgian lidded tankard; £60, a Georgian coffee pot and spirit lamp; £50, a Georgian snuff box with musical box fitting; £85, a Georgian three bottle inkstand; £22, a Georgian oval fluted teapot; £27, a Georgian oval matching tea caddy; £100, six Georgian shell pattern butter dishes; £92, a pair of Adam design Georgian design sauce boats. Furniture:- £52, a pair of Chinese Chippendale mahogany chairs; £70, a longcase clock in seaweed marquetry and walnut; £50, a Regency mahogany sideboard; £240, a rosewood writing table; £75, antique walnut chest of drawers; £80, pair of Hepplewhite mahogany armchairs; £140, antique rosewood sofa table; £180 antique mahogany Sheraton card table; £125, Georgian partners mahogany desk. Carpets:- £180, a Persian carpet; £135, another Persian carpet. China:- £40, part of Early English dinner service; £95, 168 piece Minton dinner service; £40, 45 piece Copenhagen part tea and coffee service. However, the bargain of the day went unnoticed, that of an Italian renaissance painting which had hung in the Dining room at Isel for over two hundred years. The painting, considered a copy of an almost identical painting hanging in the pitti Palace in Florence, known as the Three Ages of Man is arguably the work of Italian painter Giorgione. The unnamed buyer paid the paltry sum of £200. Within a year, John Harrington, an American multi millionaire art collector, had purchased the painting from an Atlanta auction saleroom. Harrington would dedicate the next 30 years of his life travelling the art houses of the world trying to prove that the painting is an authentic masterpiece.

== See also ==
- Listed buildings in Blindcrake

== Bibliography ==
- Ben Verinder (2008). I Felt Like an Adventure - A Life of Mary Burkett foreword by Melvyn Bragg (The First). Durham.
- John Denton (2008). Estates & Families in the County of Cumberland From The Conquest Unto The Beginning of the Reign of K. James (The First). Kendal.
- Donald Lysons; Samuel Lysons (1816). Lysons History of Cumberland; A Concise Account of the County of Cumberand in 1816. London.
- R. S. Ferguson (1871). Cumberland & Westmorland M.P.'s From The Restoration to the Reform Bill of 1867 (1660–1867). Carlisle.
- Joseph Nicolson, Richard Burn (1777). The History and Antiquities of the Counties of Westmorland and Cumberland, (2 Volumes).
- William Hutchinson (1797). The History of Cumberland Vol. 2. London.
- John Burke; John Bernard Burke (1844). A Genealogical & Heraldic History of the Extinct and Dormant Baronetcies. London.*John F. Curwen F.S.A. F.R.I.B.A. (1911). Isel Hall: Printed in the Cumberland and Westmorland Antiquarian and Archaeological Societies Transactions, Vol. XI New Series. Kendal.
- Valerie Rickerby. Isel Hall (Guide Book publication).
