= Mary Camilla Lawson =

Lawson, circa 1922

Mary Camilla Lawson (c.1865 –28 November 1939), born Mary Camilla Macan, later Lady Lawson, was a British Liberal Party politician.

== Background ==
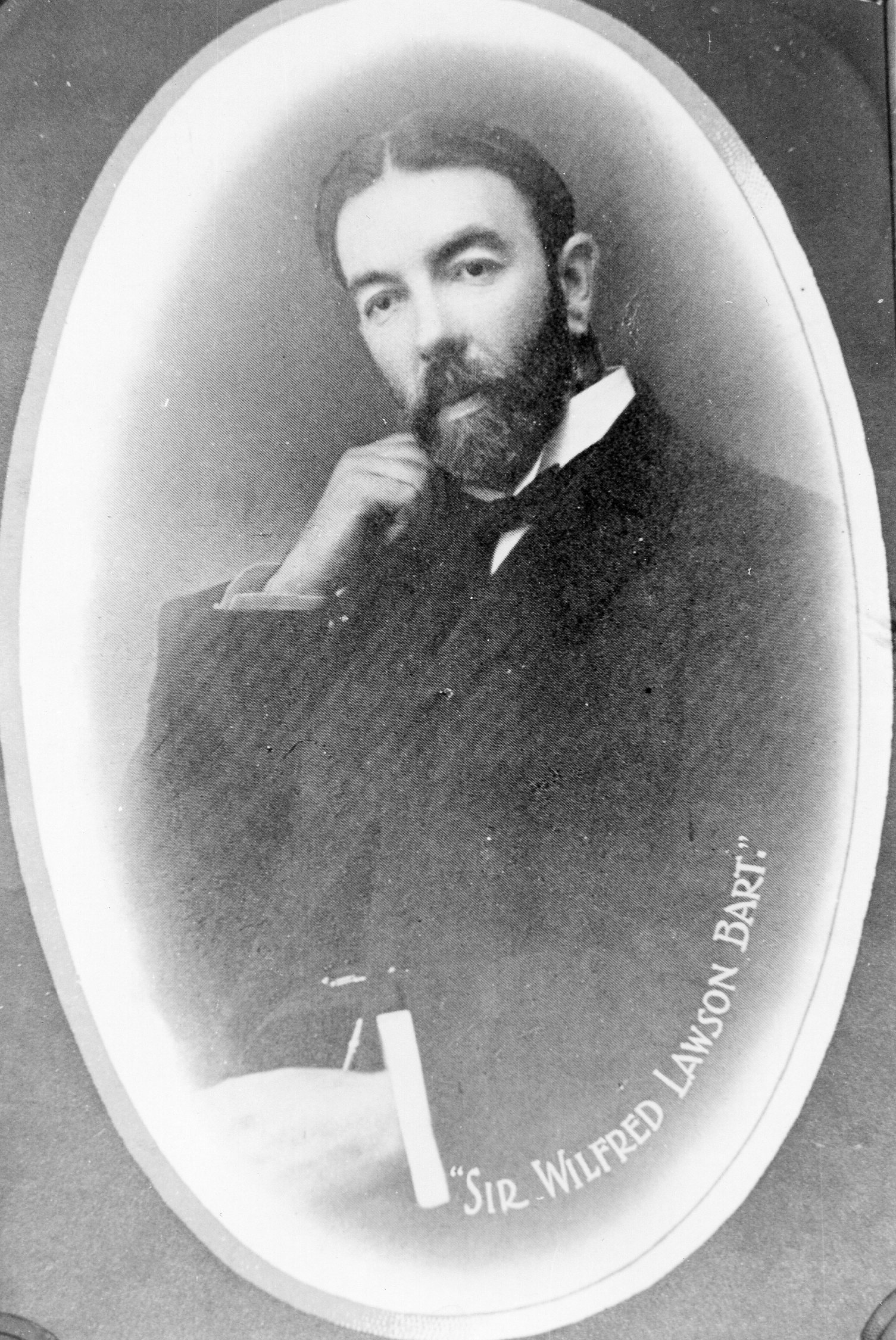
Wilfrid Lawson

She was born in Bedford as Mary Camilla Macan, fourth daughter of Turner Arthur Macan of Elstow Bedfordshire and Cariff County Armagh. On 28 April 1891, she married Wilfrid Lawson, heir to the Baronetcy of Brayton, Cumberland. They honeymooned in Australia and then resided at Isel Hall, Cumberland. Their marriage did not produce children. She became Lady Lawson in 1906 when her husband succeeded to the Baronetcy.

== Political career ==
For many years she helped her father-in-law, Sir Wilfrid Lawson MP, in his North of England constituency. She did much work for temperance reform and was a member of the British Women's Temperance Association. Lawson was Liberal candidate for the Bedford division of Bedfordshire at the 1922 General Election. She stood as an Asquith Liberal, in opposition to the sitting Liberal MP who was a supporter of the Lloyd George Coalition Government. Her intervention split the Liberal vote and helped the Unionist candidate take the seat. She did not stand for parliament again.

=== Electoral record ===
General Election 1922: Bedford
Party	Candidate	Votes	%	±%
Unionist	Richard Wells	13,460	50.3	n/a
National Liberal	Frederick Kellaway	5,714	21.4	−38.3
Labour	Arthur Sells	5,477	20.5	−19.8
Liberal	Mary Camilla Lawson	2,075	7.8	n/a
Majority		7,746	28.9	
Turnout		26,726	79.1	
Unionist gain from National Liberal		Swing		
