= Thomas Pengelly =

Thomas Pengelly may refer to:

- Thomas Pengelly (merchant) (died 1696), London merchant with whom Richard Cromwell lodged
- Sir Thomas Pengelly (judge) (1675–1730), son of the above, judge and Member of Parliament for Cockermouth, Cumberland

== See also ==
- Pengelly (surname)
