= Sir Wilfrid Lawson, 3rd Baronet =

Sir Wilfrid Lawson, 3rd Baronet may refer to:

- Sir Wilfrid Lawson, 3rd Baronet, of Isell (1697–1737), MP for Boroughbridge 1718–1722 and Cockermouth
- Sir Wilfrid Lawson, 3rd Baronet, of Brayton (1862–1937), Liberal Party politician and MP

== See also ==
- Wilfrid Lawson (disambiguation)
