= Pengelly (disambiguation) =

Pengelly is a hamlet in Cornwall.

Pengelly may also refer to:

- Pengelly (surname)
- Pengelly Landing
- Mount Pengelly
