= Sir Wilfrid Lawson, 2nd Baronet =

Sir Wilfrid Lawson, 2nd Baronet may refer to:

- Sir Wilfrid Lawson, 2nd Baronet, of Isell (1664–1704), MP for Cockermouth 1690–1695
- Sir Wilfrid Lawson, 2nd Baronet, of Brayton (1829–1906), British Liberal Party politician and temperance leader

== See also ==
- Wilfrid Lawson (disambiguation)
