= Lawson baronets of Brayton (1831) =

Escutcheon of the Lawson baronets of Brayton

The Lawson baronetcy, of Brayton in the County of Cumberland, was created in the Baronetage of the United Kingdom on 30 September 1831 for Wilfrid Lawson. Born Wilfrid Wybergh, he was the son of Thomas Wybergh by the sister of the 10th Baronet of the 1688 creation. He assumed by Royal licence the surname of Lawson in lieu of Wybergh.

The 2nd and 3rd Baronets were both Members of Parliament. The title became extinct on the death of the 4th Baronet in 1959.

== Lawson baronets, of Brayton (1831) ==
- Sir Wilfrid Lawson, 1st Baronet (1795–1867)
- Sir Wilfrid Lawson, 2nd Baronet (1829–1906)
- Sir Wilfrid Lawson, 3rd Baronet (1862–1937)
- Sir Hilton Lawson, 4th Baronet (1895–1959)

== Notes ==
Baronetage of the United Kingdom
Preceded by Jones baronets	Lawson baronets of Brayton; 30 September 1831	Succeeded by Lloyd baronets
