= Pengelley =

Pengelley is a surname. Notable people with the surname include:

- Ben Pengelley (born 1998), Australian cricketer
- Richard Pengelley (born 1960), Australian water polo player

== See also ==
- Pengelly (surname)
