= Treaty of Hanover =

The name Treaty of Hanover is attached to at least two treaties:

- the Treaty of Hanover (1710), an alliance between the Duchy of Brunswick-Lüneburg and the Tsardom of Russia in the Great Northern War
- the Treaty of Hanover (1725), which established the Hanoverian Alliance, a coalition between the Kingdom of France, the Kingdom of Great Britain, the Habsburg Monarchy and later also several other states
