= Gilfrid Lawson =

Gilfrid Lawson may refer to:

- Sir Gilfrid Lawson, 6th Baronet (1675–1749)
- Sir Gilfrid Lawson, 9th Baronet (1713–1794)
