= St Michael's Church, Isel =

Coordinates: 54.6879°N 3.3009°W

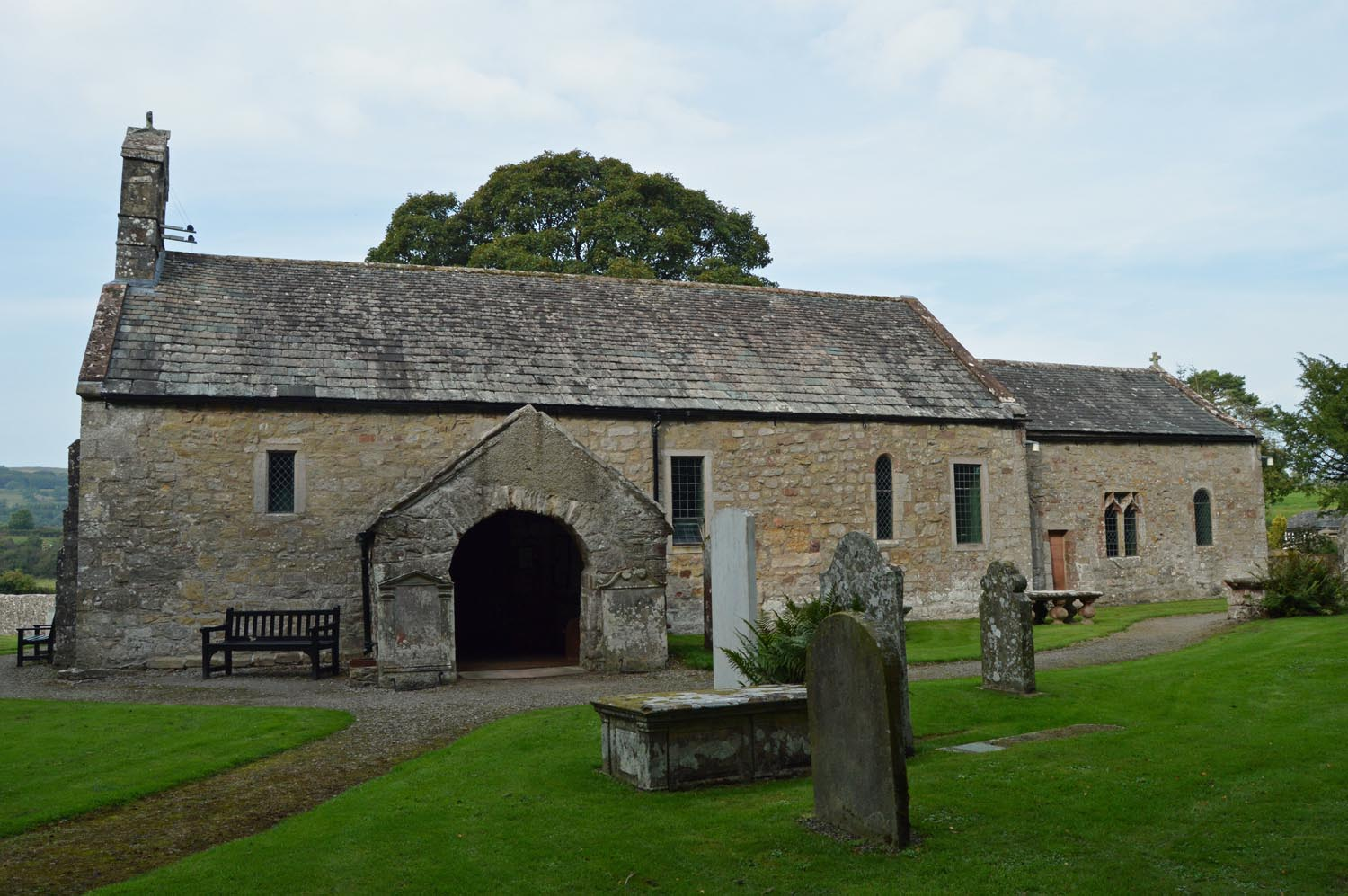
- St Michael's Church, Isel, from the south

- Location in Cumbria
- OS grid reference: NY 162 333
- Location: Isel, Cumbria
- Country: England
- Denomination: Anglican
- Website: St Michael, Isel

History
- Status: Parish church

Architecture
- Functional status: Active
- Heritage designation: Grade I
- Designated: 3 March 1967
- Architect: C. J. Ferguson (restoration)
- Architectural type: ChuIsel church cumbria.jpgrch
- Style: Norman

Specifications
- Materials: Calciferous sandstone, slate roof

Administration
- Province: York
- Diocese: Carlisle
- Archdeaconry: West Cumberland
- Deanery: Derwent
- Parish: Isel

St Michael's Church is located by the side of the River Derwent in the dispersed settlement of Isel, in the civil parish of Blindcrake, Cumbria, England. It is an active Anglican parish church in the deanery of Derwent, the archdeaconry of West Cumberland, and the diocese of Carlisle. Its benefice is united with those of nine local churches to form the benefice of Binsey. The church is recorded in the National Heritage List for England as a designated Grade I listed building.

== History ==
The church was built in the early 12th century, and was restored in 1878 by C. J. Ferguson.

== Architecture ==
=== Exterior ===
St Michael's is constructed in calciferous sandstone rubble. The roofs are in green leaves, and have coped gables with cross finials. Its plan is simple, consisting of a four-bay nave with a south porch, and a three-bay chancel with a north vestry. On the west gable is a twin open bellcote. The south doorway is Norman, with an arch of two orders with zigzag decoration. Incorporated into the porch are fragments of medieval carved stones. Also on the south side of the nave is a round-headed window and three rectangular windows. The south wall of the chancel has a blocked priest's door, a round-headed window, a lancet window, and a two-light window. The east window has two lights. At the west end is a two-light window flanked by buttresses. The north wall of the nave contains a blocked doorway and two round-headed windows.

=== Interior ===
Inside the church, the chancel arch is Norman. The font is medieval with an octagonal bowl. The choir stalls and pulpit were designed by Ferguson. Also in the church are the Royal arms of George I dated 1721, and two fragments of a cross-shaft dating from the 10th or 11th century.

== Gallery ==
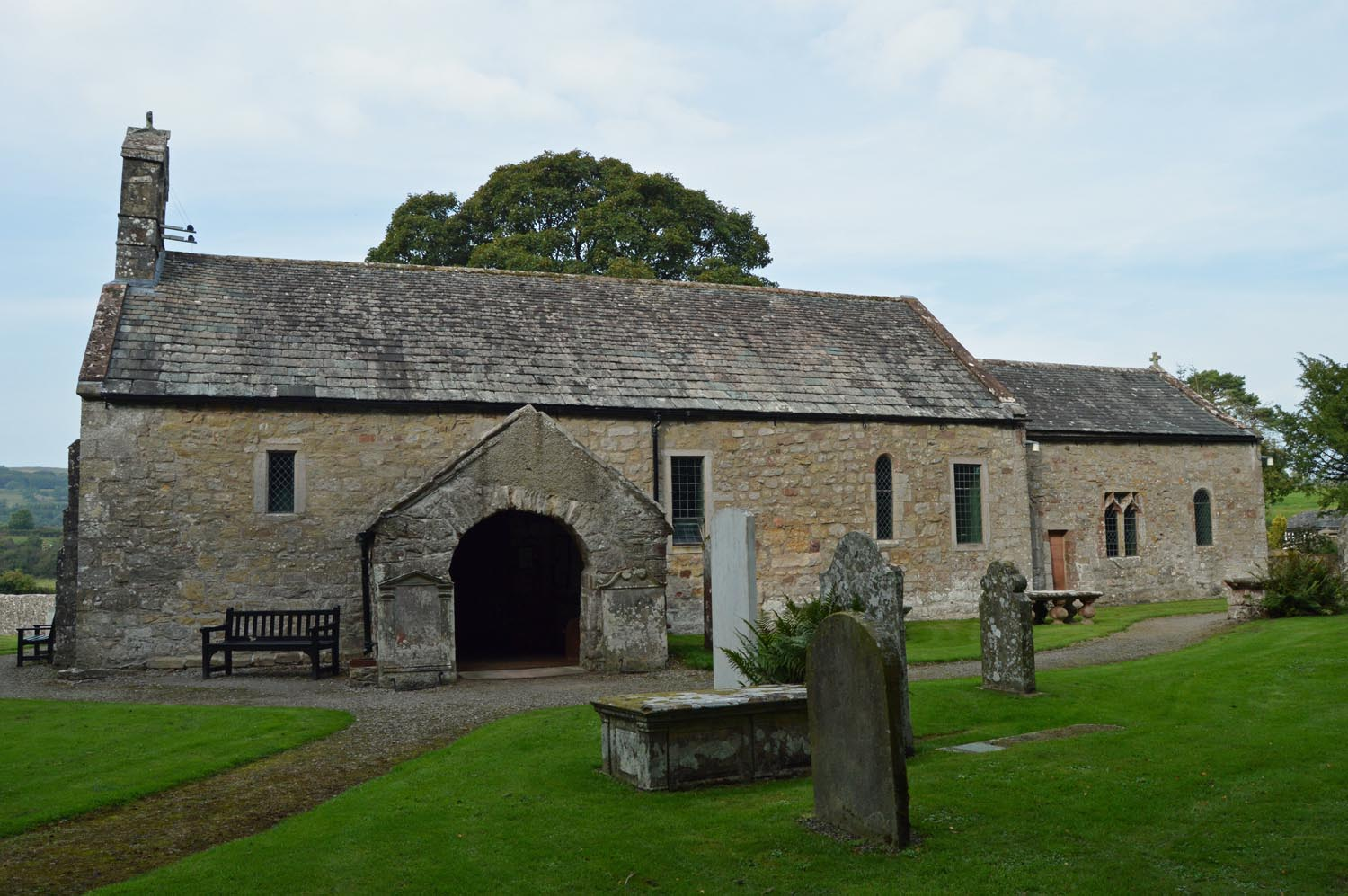
Isel church, exterior

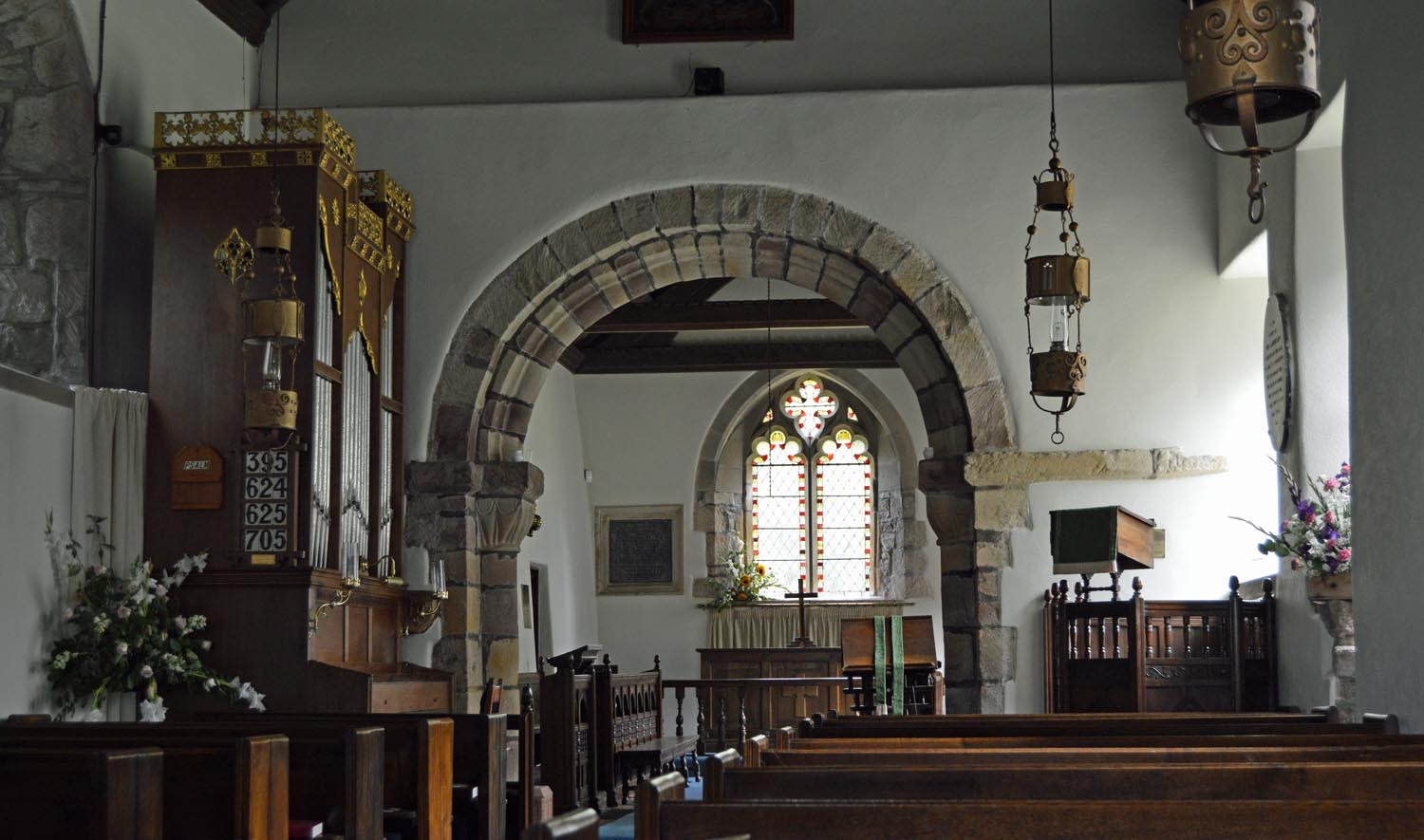
Isel church, interior showing its fine Norman arch

== See also ==
- Grade I listed churches in Cumbria
- Listed buildings in Blindcrake
