= Redmain, Cumbria =

Hamlet in Cumbria, England

Coordinates: 54.692°N 3.339°W

Redmain
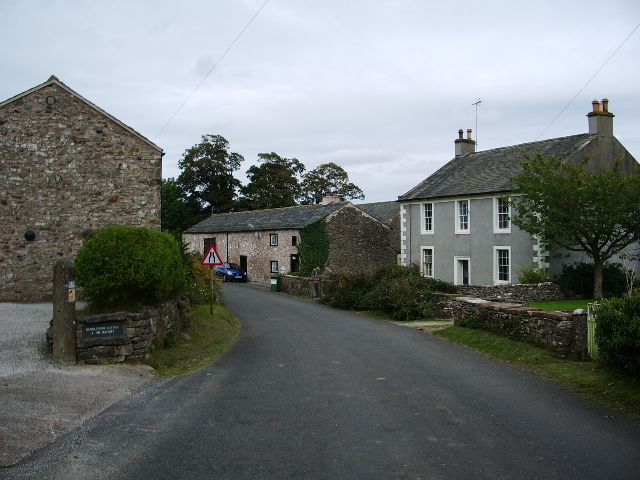
- Redmain

- Location in Allerdale, Cumbria Location within Cumbria
- OS grid reference: NY137338
- Civil parish: Blindcrake
- Unitary authority: Cumberland
- Ceremonial county: Cumbria
- Region: North West
- Country: England
- Sovereign state: United Kingdom
- Post town: COCKERMOUTH
- Postcode district: CA13
- Dialling code: 01900
- Police: Cumbria
- Fire: Cumbria
- Ambulance: North West
- UK Parliament: Penrith and Solway

Redmain is a small hamlet in the Isel Valley and parish of Blindcrake within the Lake District National Park in Cumbria, England. The hamlet lies on the south-facing slopes above the River Derwent, in an elevated position of 475 feet (145 m), giving panoramas across the Isel Valley and Lake District Fells. Nearby are the hamlets of Isel and Sunderland and the village of Blindcrake.

The hamlet is just under four miles north-east of Cockermouth, off the old Roman road to Carlisle (A595). It is 12 miles from Keswick and, along the A66, it is 29 miles from the M6 motorway at Penrith.

== Toponymy ==
The name Redmain was first recorded in 1188 as "Redeman", and is of Brittonic origin. The first element is rïd meaning "a ford", the second may be the definite article ï, and the final element is -maɣn meaning "a stone" (Welsh ryd-y-maen).

== See also ==
- Listed buildings in Blindcrake
