= Sir Wilfrid Lawson, 8th Baronet =

British politician

Sir Wilfrid Lawson, 8th Baronet (c. 1707 – 1 December 1762) was a British politician. He inherited the title on the death of Sir Alfred Lawson, 7th Baronet, in 1752. He was one of the Lawson Baronets of Isell, Cumberland.

Sir Wilfrid Lawson, 8th Baronet (1712–1763), became High Sheriff of Cumberland in 1756. In 1761, he became Member of Parliament (M.P.) for Cumberland 1761–1762. This was in 1761 after Sir James Lowther was returned both for Cumberland and Westmorland. John Robinson wrote to Charles Jenkinson that Lawson would no doubt be chosen for Cumberland should Lowther vacate that seat. The new writ was issued on 9 December, and on the 14th Lawson, in a circular letter, announced his intention to stand. On 20 December, Lowther notified his friends that he had given his interest ‘entirely’ to Lawson on this occasion. He was returned unopposed on the 28th, and in his speech to the electors declared that he would be the better able to discharge the trust imposed on him ‘as he did not look upon himself as particularly obliged to any particular party’. At the election dinner, he drank the health to the nobility and gentry who were absent but had declared for Lawson.

He was affectionately known as ‘The Clog Baronet’ because of his campaign for more equal assessment of the Land Tax. The circumstances are described Hutchinson (Vol 2) as follows:

In respect to the Land Tax in Cumberland it may not be improper here to notice the laudable and patriotic zeal of Sir Wilfrid Lawson of Isel [sic], who being a member for the county in 1760 (when it was in agitation to cause a new valuation of estates to be made throughout the Kingdom for the more equal assessment of the land tax) carried to the House of Commons a loaf of Barley Bread, a pair of wooden shoes (clogs) etc. in order to evince the poverty and low manner of living in the counties and argued so powerfully against the policy of the measure, that it miscarried; and so the Land Tax hath continued here as in other parts of the Kingdom, to be raised by assessing a particular sum upon each county according to the valuation in 1692."

== Death ==
Sir Wilfrid died on 1 December 1762 at Barnby Moor, Nottinghamshire, on his way to attend Parliament. Having no issue, the baronetcy passed to his brother, who became Sir Gilfrid Lawson, 9th Baronet.

Parliament of Great Britain
Preceded by Sir John Pennington; Sir James Lowther	Member of Parliament for Cumberland; 1761–1762; With: Sir John Pennington	Succeeded by Sir John Pennington; Sir James Lowther
Baronetage of England
Preceded by Alfred Lawson	Baronet (of Isell); 1752–1762	Succeeded by Gilfrid Lawson
