= Sir Wilfrid Lawson, 3rd Baronet, of Brayton =

English Liberal politician

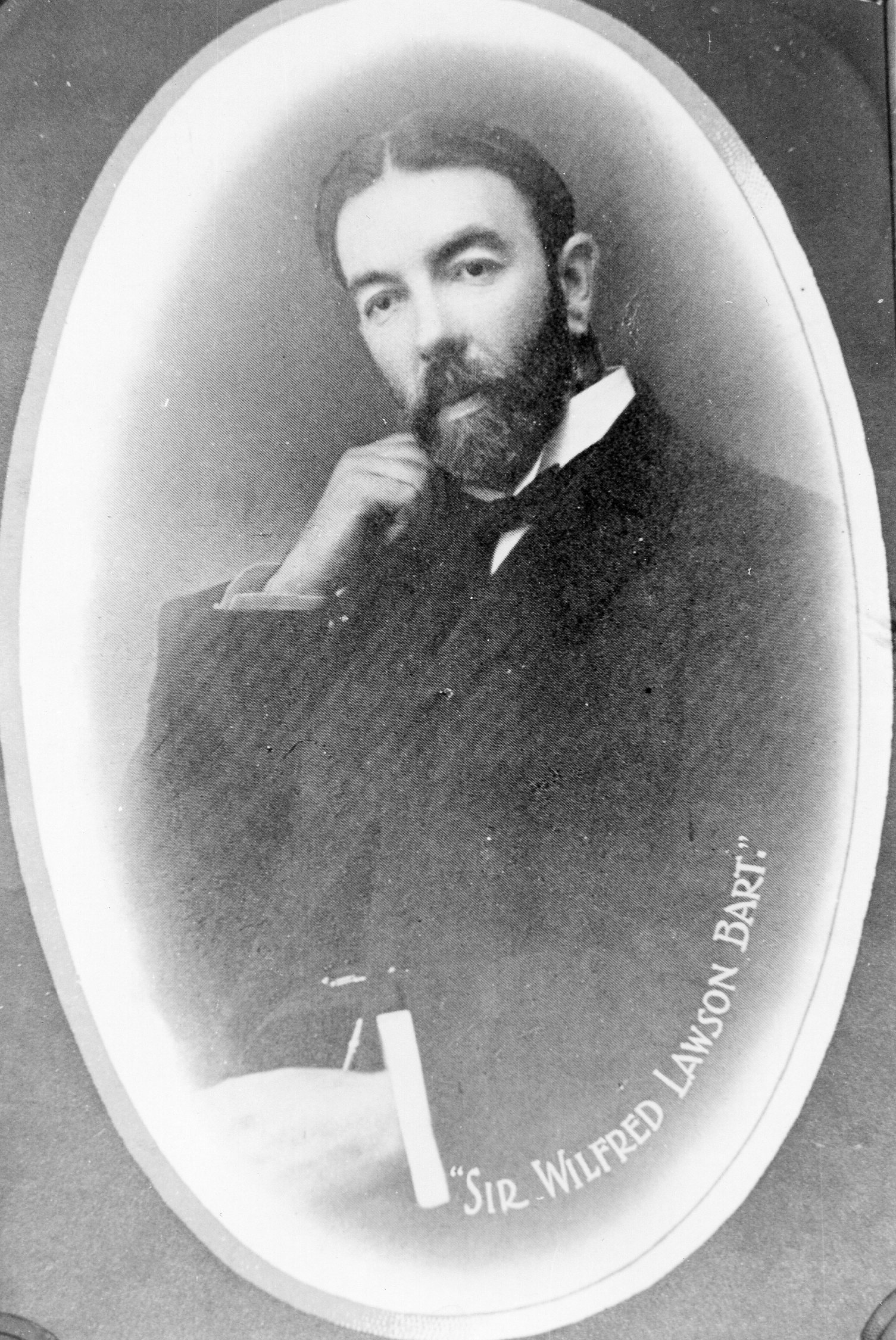
Sir Wilfrid Lawson, 3rd Baronet: Political Advertising Postcard for 1910 UK General Election

Sir Wilfrid Lawson, 3rd Baronet, of Brayton (21 October 1862 – 28 August 1937) was an English Liberal politician who sat in the House of Commons from 1910 to 1916. He was also a keen sportsman who excelled at cricket and steeplechasing.

== Early days ==
Sir Wilfrid Lawson, the son of Sir Wilfrid Lawson, 2nd Baronet, of Brayton and his wife Mary Pocklington-Stenhouse, daughter of Joseph Pocklington-Stenhouse, was born at Brayton Hall, Aspatria, Cumberland on 21 October 1862. Since the family preferred a simple sporting life, they encouraged their children to enjoy a string of outdoor pursuits, including fishing, shooting, ice skating, cricket, and the family obsession, foxhunting. He began his education at home. In 1873, he attended the Reverend W. Rickmore's school at Kenilworth. In 1875, he progressed to Wixenford School, run by Cowley Powles in Hampshire. In 1877 he began a four-year stay at Harrow School, where he was a member of Vanity House. At Harrow he developed into a distinguished scholar and athlete, becoming a valuable member of the cricket and football eleven. He left Harrow in 1881 and entered Trinity College, Oxford where again he displayed his scholastic and athletic abilities, becoming a very good polo player. He gained his BA degree in 1888.

=== Marriage ===
On 28 April 1891, Lawson married Miss Mary Camilla Macan, fourth daughter of Turner A Macan of Elstow Bedfordshire and Cariff County Armagh. They honeymooned in Australia and then resided at Isel Hall, Cumberland. Their marriage did not produce children.

=== Travelling ===
Lawson became a great traveller. During the years 1883-7 he visited France, Germany, Italy, Switzerland, Norway, Sweden and Denmark. In 1888, he travelled the length of the United States and returned through Canada. During the spring and summer of 1889, accompanied by his brother Arthur, he travelled in Greece and then visited Constantinople (Istanbul); before continuing through Bulgaria, Romania, the Black Sea, Danube Principalities, the Crimea and Russia; where they visited both Moscow and St. Petersburg. In 1890, he took a voyage to Bombay, India, calling at Cairo on his return. He recorded many of these travelogues in the pages of the Carlisle Journal.

In the summer of 1911, Lawson travelled as a tourist to Iceland, where he happened to meet the Swedish author, painter, and cartoonist Albert Engström (1869–1940), who was also visiting the island. Lawson decided to join Engström and his travel companion, the botanist Thorild Wulff (1877–1917), on their journey, and together with the two Swedes, he climbed to the summit of Hekla, on 10 August. Engström was impressed and bemused by Lawson’s exuberant energy and eccentricity, and in his travelogue Åt Häcklefjäll (1913) he calls him "one of the most unconventional fellows I have met on my journey through life".

== Politics ==
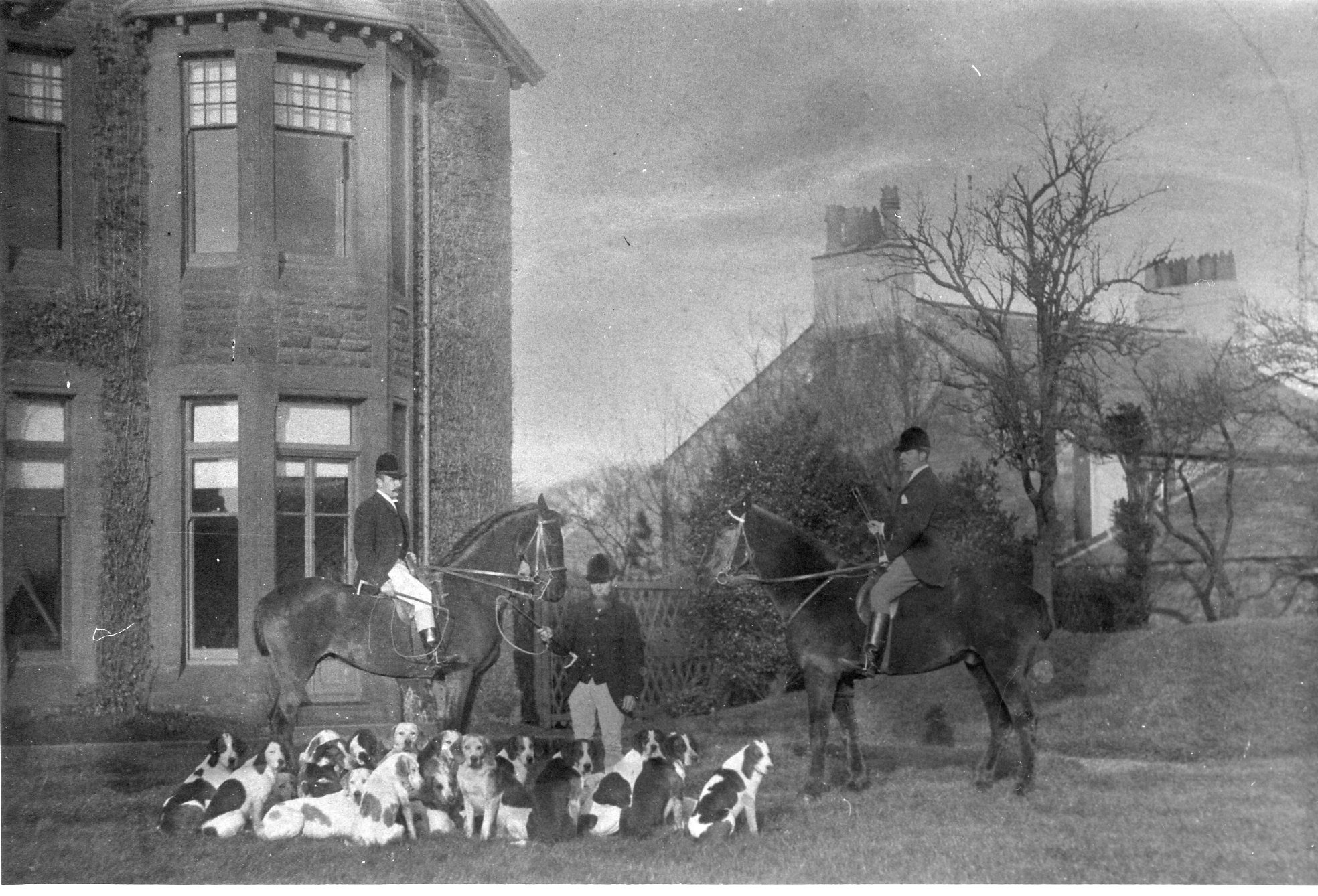
The Brayton Blazers Foxhounds

Lawson began his political apprenticeship, standing on the platform supporting his father. Like his father he was a committed teetotaller and an extreme radical. He also possessed the same gift of making very witty and appropriate speeches on a wide range of related subjects, which he enlivened with spicy tales and racy anecdotes. His political and temperance speeches always dealt with contemporary topics in a common sense and rational manner. In 1885, when his father was in serious ill health, recuperating in the South of France, Lawson acted as his father's understudy in the general election for the Cockermouth division. Although he acquitted himself and rendered useful service, his father lost the election by a mere ten votes. In July 1886, Lawson stood as a Liberal candidate for the parliamentary division of Mid- Cumberland but was defeated by James Lowther, the Tory candidate, who gained a majority of 644 votes. From 1886 to 1889, he acted as chairman of the Aspatria School Board. In January 1889, Lawson stood as a candidate for the Cumberland County Council for the Bridekirk division but was defeated by 166 votes. Lawson first stood for the Cockermouth, a seat previously held by his father, in the general election held in January 1910. He had two opponents, the sitting Conservative member Sir John Randles and a Labour party candidate named Whitehead. However, with a split working class vote Lawson finished second. In the general election held in December of the same year, Lawson contested the same seat in a straight two-way contest and was successful by a majority of over 500 votes. Lawson stood on a platform of peace, temperance, free trade, the veto and reform. The only warfare he would engage in was the warfare of argument for the principles of equality, justice and freedom. He argued for a continuation of free trade and against tariff reform. He supported Irish Home Rule, temperance reform, female suffrage, and the abolition of the House of Lords. Although he made sixteen contributions to parliamentary discussion it is, without doubt, his final speech which is worthy of consideration. This was in response to the Government's request for a vote of credit of £100 million to finance the first six months of the First World War. Part of his speech stated:-

If it were not true it would seem incredible that in a few short days we should be intervening in the affairs of and being asked for a Vote of Credit for a war in Europe with which we have no direct concern. This war was not forced upon us by any duty or obligation under any Treaty, as I understand the case, and I think it would have been much better if we had left these affairs alone, as Parliament hitherto has been assured, and was given distinctly to understand, they would be left alone. I believe the only sound principal and practice, especially for a country geographically situated as we are, is to have friendship with all nations and entangling alliance with none. It seems to me the neutrality of Great Britain would have been a far more important national and international asset for us than the neutrality of Belgium was or is likely to be.

By February 1916 he was totally out of sympathy with the government and resigned his seat. He never re-entered politics.

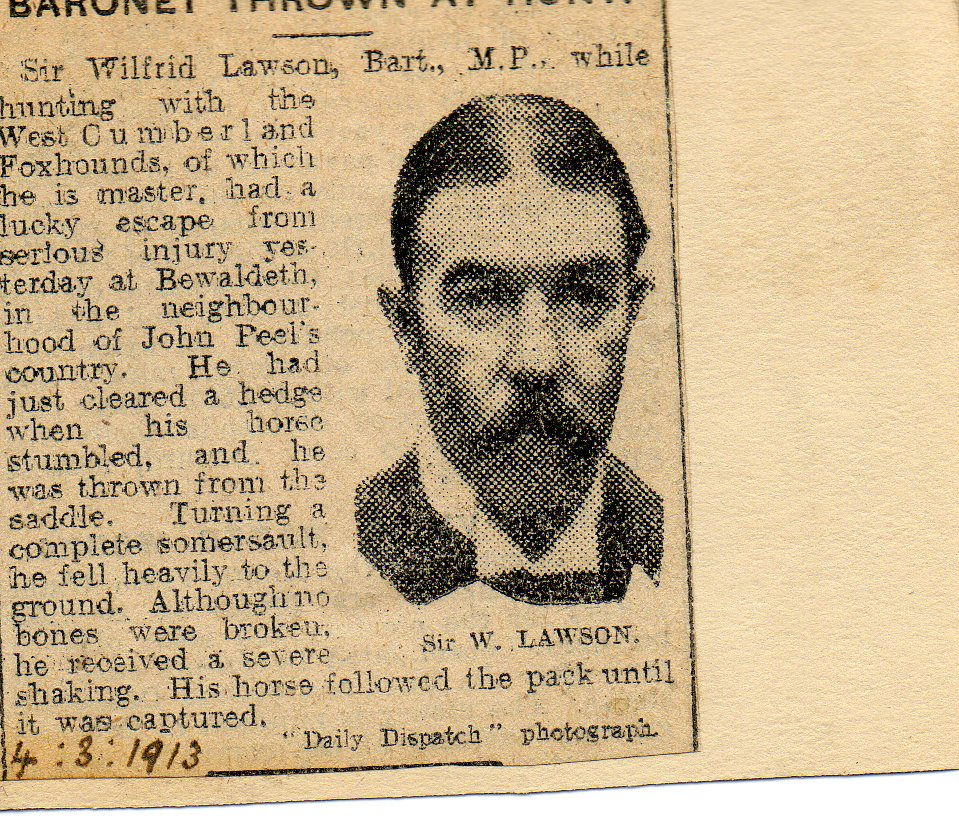
Newspaper report of horse racing accident to Sir Wilfrid Lawson

== Sport ==
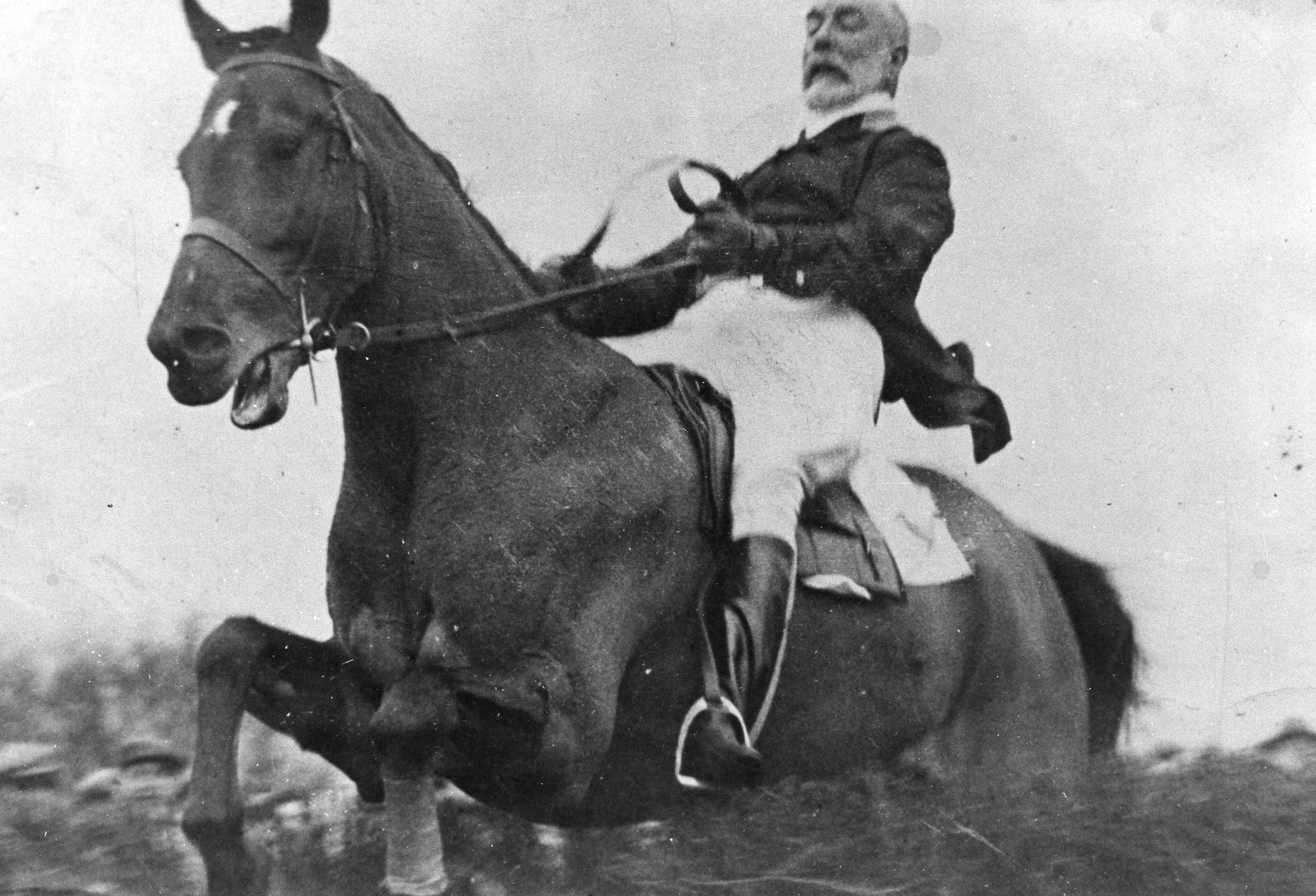
Sir Wilfrid Lawson, 3rd Baronet, Fox Hunting

After his parliamentary resignation, Lawson devoted the remainder of his life to the pursuit of outdoor sports and activities. He went fishing, Hunting, rode horses and played cricket. He became the archetypal country squire, and at the age of 74 scorned friendly suggestions that he should take it easy, that he was too old for competitive cricket and horseracing. His motto was that of Lindsay Gordon's:-

No game was over worth a rap
For a rational man to play,
Into which no danger or mishap
Can possibly find its way.

His father bought Lawson his first pony named 'Fun' at an early age. This was followed by a long line of horses, many aptly named in line with his political persuasion; Ireland, Radical. Home Ruler, Mr Parnell etc.etc. On his return from Oxford, Lawson acquired a pack of hounds, which he called the Brayton Blazers. In 1886, he became Master of Foxhounds for the western division of Cumberland. He continued to maintain the Cumberland Foxhounds at his own expense and became Master of all of Cumberland in 1909, a position he maintained until his death. He became a regular rider at the Cumberland Point-to-Point steeple chasing events, where riders rode races over 4 miles of open countryside, jumping in excess of 20 fences. Lawson had a peculiar style, appearing to ride by balance, sitting upright in cavalry fashion, which may have accounted for several of his falls. In 1931, he fell at the Blackhall steeplechase and spent several weeks in a nursing home recuperating. In April 1934, while riding his aged brown Gelding, Tinker B in the Cumberland Farmers Hunt Point-to-Point he was thrown over a fence and to make matters worse the horse rolled over him. He was taken to a Carlisle nursing home, where he remained unconscious for many hours. Although in a critical state he eventually made a complete recovery and in the following year resumed his hunting, horse riding and playing cricket. In March 1936, the year before his death, he not only won the opening race of the Cumberland Hunt Point-to-Point meeting at Moota, Cockermouth, but also the second race.

== Death ==
On Saturday 27 August 1937, an apparently healthy Lawson left the cricket pavilion, a few yards away from his home to take his place at the wicket. On his way to the crease he passed some jocular remarks about the tail end of the team having to shoulder the responsibility caused by the failure of the earlier batsmen. When out in the open he congratulated the opposing team on their excellent display. He quickly scored three runs, and after playing a ball back to the bowler, he recovered his stance only to fall to the ground, and with a slight groan his life had passed. He had died as he frequently predicted, either in the saddle or on the playing field. He was a few days short of his 75th birthday. After the cremation at Newcastle and a memorial service at Aspatria, the ashes were interred in Isel churchyard. He left an estate valued at £212,985, and cash to the value of £49,081. He was succeeded by Sir Hilton Lawson, 4th Baronet. Lady Lawson died on 28 November 1939.

== Bibliography ==
- Craig, F. W. S. (1989) [1974]. British parliamentary election results 1885–1918 (2nd ed.). Chichester: Parliamentary Research Services. ISBN 0-900178-27-2.

Parliament of the United Kingdom
| Preceded by Sir John Randles | Member of Parliament for Cockermouth; Dec. 1910–1916 | Succeeded by Joseph Bliss |
Baronetage of the United Kingdom
| Preceded by Wilfrid Lawson | Baronet (of Brayton, Cumberland); 1906–1937 | Succeeded by Hilton Lawson |
