= Sir Wilfrid Lawson, 2nd Baronet, of Isell =

English politician

Sir Wilfrid Lawson, 2nd Baronet (31 October 1664 – November 1704) of Isel was an English politician.

== Family ==
He was the son of William Lawson and inherited his title on the death in 1688 of his grandfather Sir Wilfrid Lawson, 1st Baronet, of Isell.

He married Elizabeth, daughter and heir to George Preston of Holker in Lancashire. They had three sons; Wilfrid, William who died a bachelor; and John, an army officer, accidentally killed during a review at Dublin, when struck by a ball aimed towards a fellow officer. Their eldest daughter Elizabeth also met an unfortunate death, falling from a horse whilst riding in the park at Castle Howard, Yorkshire. Reports suggest that she lost her life owing to an over-excess of modesty. For as her servant tried to disentangle her petticoat from the saddle she screamed, frightening the horse, which kicked her.

== Career ==
Lawson was High Sheriff of Cumberland in 1689 and although he had succeeded to the family estate the previous year he quickly sought, and was granted, permission to live outside the county. The following year he successfully contested the election at Cockermouth, where he was classed as a Court (Tory) supporter. On 1 Apr. 1690 the House of Commons received a petition from the bailiff and burgesses of Cockermouth contending that the return of Lawson had been illegal due to his serving as sheriff at the time of election. The petition was referred to the elections committee, but no report was made. After his defeat at the 1695 election, Lawson began to travel, spending a month in Ireland in 1697 and in June 1699 he journeyed to France. In 1702, Lawson stood as a Whig candidate where he finished second in the poll. However, following the decision of the Cumberland sheriff to disallow 46 of Lawson's votes, his total equalled that of his cousin Gilfrid Lawson and it was the latter who was returned. Lawson petitioned against the return, but no report was forthcoming.

One interesting anecdote worth mentioning (and afterwards told of J. C. Curwen); is that whilst representing Cockermouth Sir Wilfrid appeared in the house of Commons dressed as a Cumberland labourer, with a loaf of bread under one arm and a skim-milk cheese under the other, thus illustrating the inability of the agricultural classes to bear increased taxation. He was known as the ‘bright star of the North’, a sobriquet taken from the family crest, which is heraldically described as;

== Death ==
On 11 November 1704 Lawson died. In his will he left about £600 in money; and £800 per annum. Each of his five younger children was to have £1,000, with power to his lady to advance any of them to £500 . . . The tithes of Blindcrake and Redmaine (all the impropriations that he had) are settled upon the vicar of Isel forever. The £600 left to her Majesty, in recompense of all undue payments of his land tax. In April 1705 Lawson's widow petitioned the crown against this final bequest and in August the Treasury, following a report from the attorney-general that ‘the codicil containing the bequest is so worded that it carries a presumption with it that the testator was not in his senses when he dictated it’, awarded the £600 to Lawson's widow. Lawson was succeeded by his eldest son Sir Wilfrid Lawson, 3rd Baronet, of Isell.

== Coat of arms ==
‘Out of the clouds proper, two flexed arms, embowed, coupled at the elbow, rested ermine, cuffed argent, supporting in the arms proper, and a sun in splendour’.

Parliament of England
Preceded by Sir Henry Capell; Henry Fletcher	Member of Parliament for Cockermouth; 1690–1695; With: Sir Orlando Gee	Succeeded by Sir Charles Gerard; Goodwin Wharton
Baronetage of England
Preceded by Wilfrid Lawson	Baronet (of Isell); 1688–1704	Succeeded by Wilfrid Lawson

== Bibliography ==
- R. S. Ferguson (1871). Cumberland & Westmorland M.P.'s From The Restoration To The Reform Bill Of 1867 (1660-1867). Carlisle.
- F. J. Field (1937). An Armorial For Cumberland. Kendal.
