= 1916 Cockermouth by-election =

UK parliamentary by-election

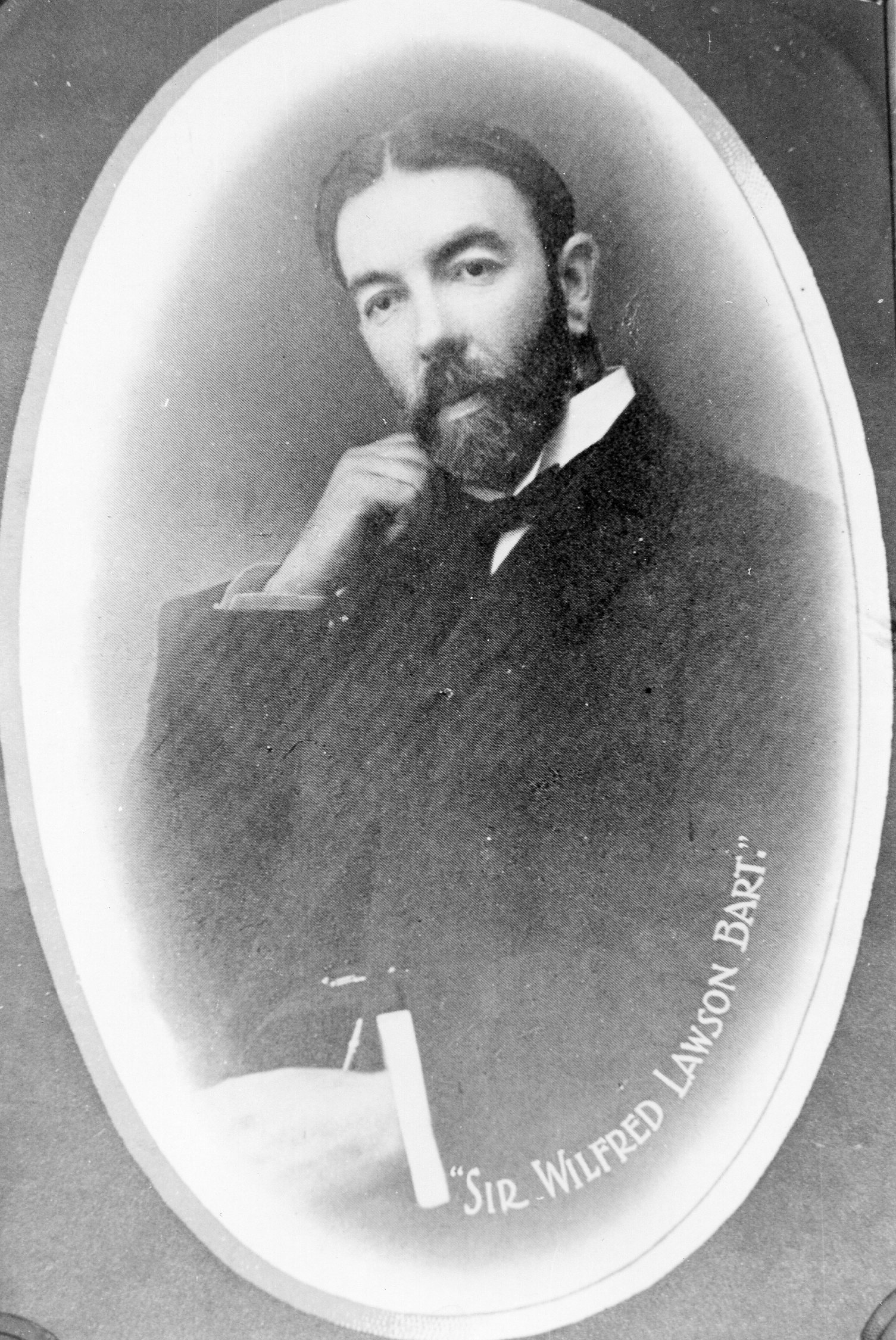
Lawson

The 1916 Cockermouth by-election was held on 2 March 1916. The by-election was held due to the resignation of the incumbent Liberal MP, Sir Wilfrid Lawson, 3rd Baronet, of Brayton. It was won by the Liberal candidate Joseph Bliss, who was unopposed.

Cockermouth by-election, 1916
Party	Candidate	Votes	%	±%
Liberal	Joseph Bliss	Unopposed	N/A	N/A
Liberal hold				
