= Hilton Lawson =

Sir Hilton Lawson, 4th Baronet (1895–1959) was the son of Mordaunt Lawson, third son of Sir Wilfrid Lawson, 2nd Baronet, of Brayton. He was educated at Repton School and later the Royal Military College. He served throughout World War I in the Royal Fusiliers where he attained the rank of Major. In 1939 he rejoined the army, went to France with the British Expeditionary Force, taken prisoner at Dunkirk and did not return until 1945. He succeeded his uncle Sir Wilfrid Lawson, 3rd Baronet, of Isell in 1937 and afterwards took up residence at Isel Hall.

In 1952, Lawson became the High Sheriff of Cumberland. He was a keen sportsman, especially outdoor pursuits. He was chairman of the Cumberland Foxhounds under successive Masters and the chairman of the committee responsible for reviving the Cumberland point-to-point steeplechasing at Moota, Cockermouth, where he officiated as judge. As a keen angler, he was a member of the Derwent Board of Conservators, the body preceding the Cumberland Rivers Board. In politics he forsook the Liberal Party family tradition and supported the Conservative Party, he was the principal nominee of Helen Fox in the 1950 election for the Workington (UK Parliament constituency).

Hilton, who was unmarried, died at Isel on 12 January 1959, and the baronetcy expired with him.

Baronetage of the United Kingdom
Preceded by Wilfrid Lawson	Baronet (of Brayton); 1937–1959	Extinct
