= Sir Wilfrid Lawson, 3rd Baronet, of Isell =

British politician

Wilfrid Lawson
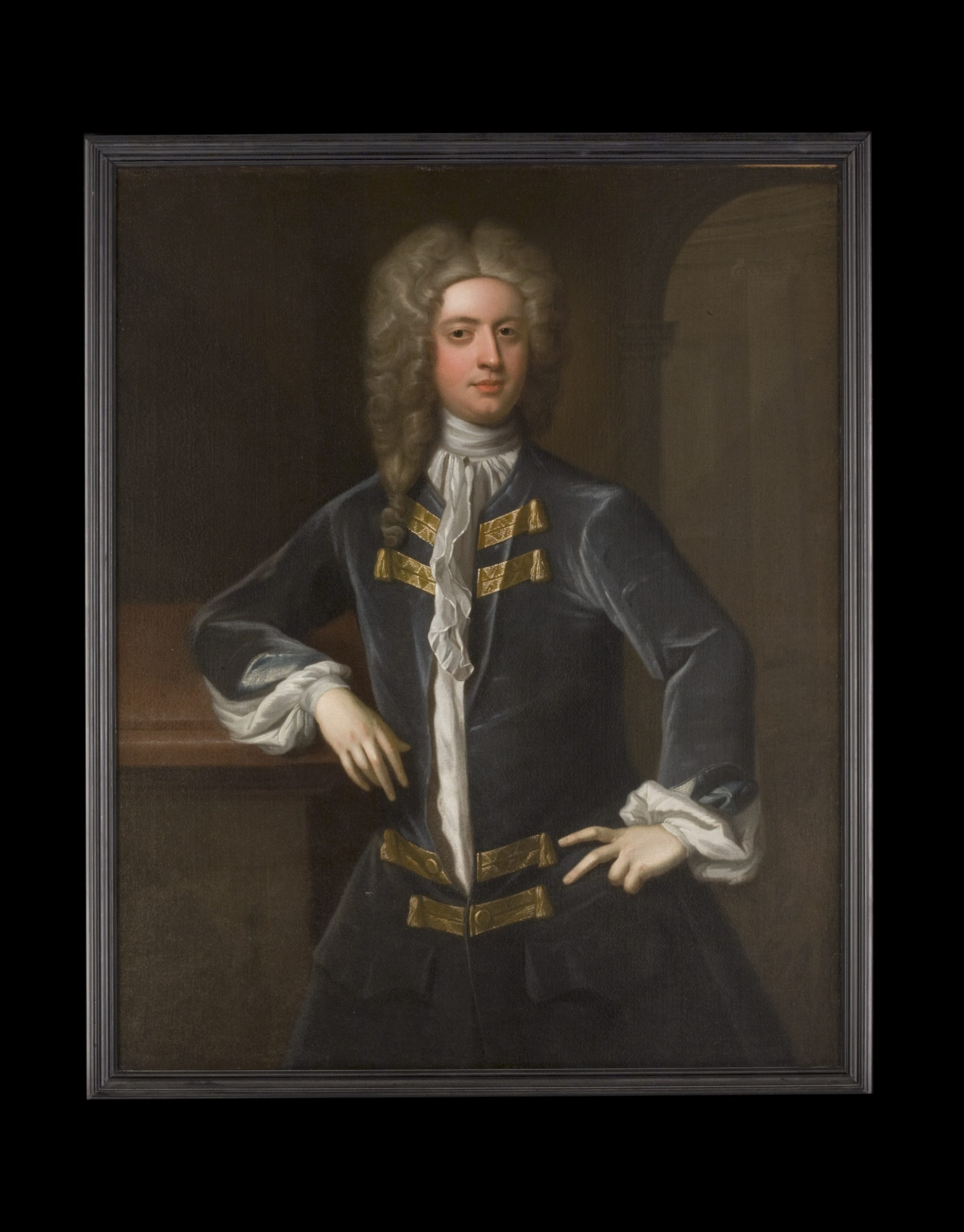

3rd Baronet of Isell
- In office 1704–1737

Member of the British Parliament for Boroughbridge
- In office 1718–1722

Member of the British Parliament for Cockermouth
- In office 1722–1737

Personal details
- Born: 1697
- Died: 13 July 1737 (aged 39–40)
- Spouse: Elizabeth Lucy Mordaunt
- Children: 4
- Parents: Sir Wilfrid Lawson, 2nd Baronet, of Isell (father); Elizabeth Preston (mother)
- Education: Queen's College, Oxford; Inner Temple

Sir Wilfrid Lawson, 3rd Baronet of Isell FRS (1697 – 13 July 1737) was a British politician who sat in the House of Commons from 1718 to 1737.

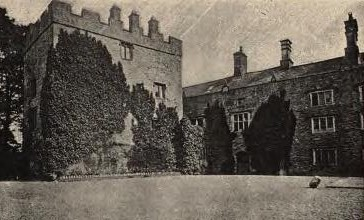
Isel Hall, Cumberland in 1892

Lawson was the son and heir of Sir Wilfrid Lawson, 2nd Baronet, of Isell, Cumbria, and his wife Elizabeth Preston, daughter of George Preston of Holker, Lancashire. He succeeded his father in 1704, inheriting the baronetcy and Isel Hall. He matriculated at Queen's College, Oxford, in 1713, and was admitted to study law at the Inner Temple in 1715.

In 1717, Lawson stood for the Cockermouth constituency after Nicholas Lechmere accepted a ministerial position and accordingly resigned the seat. However, the returning officer made a double return, returning both Lord Percy Seymour and Sir Wilfrid Lawson. Both parties immediately petitioned against the result; Lord Percy, on the grounds that Lawson was a minor, (not having attained the age of 21), while Lawson based his petition on the grounds of bribery. Although both petitions were withdrawn, Sir Wilfrid did admit the charge and consequently, Lord Percy took the seat.

In 1718, Lawson became Member of Parliament for the Boroughbridge constituency. He made his maiden speech on 11 November, in support of the government on the Address, voting for the repeal of the Occasional Conformity and Schism Acts, but against the Peerage Bill. He was one of the backers of the Royal Academy of Music, establishing a London opera company which commissioned numerous works from Handel, Bononcini and others. In 1721, he figured in the report of the South Sea Company committee of the House of Commons as one of the members who had accepted bribes from the company, in his case £1,000 in stock.

Lawson was Groom of the Bedchamber to George I from 1720 to 1725 and was elected as Fellow of the Royal Society in 1718.

In 1722 Lawson was returned for Cockermouth, which he represented until his death. He continued to speak in support of the Government until January 1724, when he supported an opposition motion for disbanding some additional troops taken on in 1723; in February 1725 he supported Pulteney's motion for referring the report on Lord Macclesfield to a select committee instead of proceeding to impeach him; in March 1726 he again supported Pulteney in opposing a vote of credit; and in January 1727 he moved for papers relating to the accession of Sweden to the treaty of Hanover, the motion being rejected without a division.

In the next Parliament Lawson became one of the leading opposition Whigs, speaking against the Government on a vote of credit in 1728 and the civil list arrears in 1729, when he led for the Opposition on the Address. He again spoke first for them in January 1732 against the treaty of Seville, and in February 1733 on the army estimates. In February 1733 he moved for papers relative to the Spanish depredations, and carried his motion without a division, notwithstanding serious criticism from the then Prime Minister, Sir Robert Walpole. In 1736, he seconded an opposition motion for the repeal of the Test Act. In 1737, he spoke in favour of an increase in the Prince of Wales's allowance.

Upon his death at Newcastle upon Tyne in 1737 Lawson gave the vicar of Isel church the tithes of Blindcrake, Sunderland, Isel Old-Park and Isel Gate in lieu of the tithes of Isel demesne.

He had married Elizabeth Lucy Mordaunt, daughter of the Hon. Harry Mordaunt MP and niece of the Earl of Peterborough, with whom he had two sons and two daughters. He was succeeded in turn by his elder son, Sir Wilfrid Lawson, 4th Baronet (1731–39) and his younger son Sir Mordaunt Lawson, 5th Baronet (1735–43) both of whom died in childhood, thus ending the supremacy of the Isel Lawsons.

The eldest daughter Elizabeth, who died in 1759, also deserves a historical footnote. She became a Maid of Honour to the Princess of Wales and although courted by General James Wolfe, hero of Quebec, she refused his hand of marriage. As told by Joseph Pennell, writing in Highways and Byways in the Lake District. Stopping on his travels at Isel he recalls:

"...it was from this remote grey manor house, old enough even then, that the lady came who had such hold upon the affections of the famous General Wolfe as to cast quite a shadow over several years of his too short life."

== Bibliography ==
- R. S. Ferguson (1871). Cumberland & Westmorland M.P.'s from the Restoration to the Reform Bill of 1867 (1660-1867). Carlisle.
- Donald Lysons; Samuel Lysons (1816). Lysons' History of Cumberland (A Concise Account of the County of Cumberand in 1816. London.

Parliament of Great Britain
Preceded by Thomas Wilkinson; Richard Steele	Member of Parliament for Boroughbridge; 1718–1722; With: Richard Steele	Succeeded by Conyers Darcy; James Tyrrell
Preceded by Sir Thomas Pengelly; Anthony Lowther	Member of Parliament for Cockermouth; 1722–1737; With: Sir Thomas Pengelly 1722–1727; Hon. William Finch 1727–1737	Succeeded by Hon. William Finch; Eldred Curwen
Baronetage of England
Preceded by Wilfrid Lawson	Baronet (of Isell); 1704–1737	Succeeded by Wilfrid Lawson
