= Joseph Bliss =

MP for Cockermouth
- In office 2 March 1916 – 12 December 1918
- Preceded by: Sir Wilfrid Lawson, 3rd Baronet, of Brayton
- Succeeded by: constituency abolished

Personal details
- Born: 1853
- Died: 12 December 1939 (aged 85–86)
- Party: Liberal

Joseph Bliss (1853 – 12 December 1939) was a British Liberal Party politician.

He was elected as member of parliament (MP) for Cockermouth at an unopposed by-election in March 1916, following the resignation of the Liberal MP Sir Wilfrid Lawson. He had previously stood unsuccessfully in the North Lonsdale at the general elections in January 1910 and December 1910, losing narrowly on both occasions. In January 1910, Bliss's campaign team asked for a recount after the vote was declared, but were told that the ballot boxes had already been sealed and sent by train to London. He lodged a petition, which claimed that invalid votes for Haddock had been allowed while valid votes for Bliss had been disallowed. The petition was heard in the King's Bench Division of the High Court, before Justice Lawrence and Justice Phillimore. They allowed a recount, in which the Conservative George Haddock's majority was increased to 169 votes (2.0%), and Bliss was required to pay the costs of the hearing.

The Cockermouth constituency was abolished at the 1918 general election when Bliss was one of two sitting MPs who contested the new Lonsdale constituency. The Coalition Coupon went to his Conservative opponent Claude Lowther, who won the seat. Bliss did not stand for Parliament again.

Bliss had spent several years living in the Ottoman Empire.

Parliament of the United Kingdom
Preceded by Sir Wilfrid Lawson	Member of Parliament for Cockermouth; 1916 – 1918	Constituency abolished
