= Sir Wilfrid Lawson, 1st Baronet =

Sir Wilfrid Lawson, 1st Baronet may refer to:

- Sir Wilfrid Lawson, 1st Baronet, of Isell (c. 1610–1688), MP for Cumberland 1659 and 1660 and Cockermouth 1660-1679
- Sir Wilfrid Lawson, 1st Baronet, of Brayton (1795–1867)

See also

- Wilfrid Lawson (disambiguation)
