= Pengelly (surname) =

Pengelly is a surname. Notable people with the surname include:

- Edna Pengelly (1874–1959), New Zealand teacher and nurse
- Emma Little-Pengelly (born 1979), Northern Ireland politician
- J. Isaac Pengelly (1853–1937), English clerk and activist
- Jessica Pengelly (born 1991), South African-born Australian swimmer
- Melville Pengelly (1901–1973), New Zealand cricket umpire
- Nigel Pengelly (1925–2010), Canadian politician
- Thomas Pengelly (merchant) (fl. c.1660–1715), London merchant with whom Richard Cromwell lodged
- Sir Thomas Pengelly (judge) (1675–1730), judge and Member of Parliament for Cockermouth, Cumberland, son of the above
- Thomas Pengelly (disambiguation), multiple people
- William Pengelly (1812–1894), British geologist and archaeologist
