= Sir Gilfrid Lawson, 9th Baronet =

British baronet

Sir Gilfrid Lawson, 9th Baronet (1713 – 1794), was one of the Lawson Baronets.

He was a son of Sir Alfred Lawson, 7th Baronet and inherited his title in 1762 on the death of his brother, Sir Wilfrid Lawson, 8th Baronet, who died on the way to Parliament.

Although never a Member of Parliament, Gilfrid left his mark on the political scene while serving as High Sheriff of Cumberland during the controversial election for the Cumberland constituency in 1768. A contest between the representatives of the Lowther family and those sponsored by the Duke of Portland, the first time a county election had seen an open contest between the Tories and the Whigs. Hitherto, the representation of the County of Cumberland had been divided; and whereas both representatives had been Whigs, one had generally been a Court Whig and the other an Independent Whig.

The desire of King George III of Great Britain to free himself from the rule of the great aristocratic houses (Whigs) not only united all sections of that party, but also by bestowing his favour on the Tory party, greatly enhanced their political importance. The said election was contested between Whigs and Tories, not between Whigs on one side, and the Country party composed of Whigs, Tories and Jacobites on the other.

A significant proportion of the people of Cumberland were imbued with Jacobite principles, thus favouring the Lowthers. Henry Curwen and Henry Fletcher represented the Whigs, while James Lowther, 1st Earl of Lonsdale and Humphrey Senhouse represented the Tories.

Both Parties were equally wealthy and according to the contemporary gossip chronicles, as much as £80,000 may have been expended. The controversial poll lasted nineteen days and on its termination, the Sheriff having rejected many of the electors, returned Curwen and Lowther. Many voters were rejected because the Land-tax lists, which were then the register of voters were in many instances signed only by two Land-tax Commissioners, whereas the Act imperatively required three signatures.

In other cases, the proper duplicates (which were then the legal registers) were not produced, but only the collectors' lists. Had Lawson rejected all of the invalid votes, he would have acted correctly and Curwen and Lowther would have been duly elected.

However, Lawson appears to have been a man of indecision, for he accepted some of the voters, which he marked with a query, and then did what he had no right to do; he struck several of the voters out of the poll book and returned Curwen and Lowther. Both parties petitioned Parliament. The Whigs based their complaints on the conduct of the Sheriff who was clearly in the wrong. Had he simply refused to receive the votes, which were clearly invalid, the return would have been the correct decision; but having placed the invalid votes on the poll book, which he had no authority to interfere with, for that was the duty of the members of the House of Commons. After much further wrangling, a compromise was reached, resulting in the election of Curwen and Fletcher.

It was also agreed that all future polls would be contested by one nominated member from each party only, a compromise, respected for 63 years. Sir Gilfrid through all this meddling was very fortunate to end his days at Brayton. A motion moved by the Whigs in the House of Commons, later withdrawn, sought his committal to Newgate.

Lawson became one of the early Cumberland landlords to promote a parliamentary land inclosure act, when in 1770 at his request, Parliament passed the Bassenthwaite Inclosure Act 1770 (10 Geo. 3. c. 28 Pr.), enabling the wasteland in that parish to be enclosed and made available for cultivation.

Sir Gilfrid died in 1794, and his remains lie in the southeast corner of Aspatria churchyard. Lawson had married Amelia, daughter of John Lovett Esq. The marriage produced two children, a son Wilfrid and a daughter Amelia. He was succeeded by his son Sir Wilfrid Lawson, 10th Baronet, the last of that order.

== Bibliography ==
- R. S. Ferguson (1871). Cumberland & Westmorland M.P.'s From The Restoration To The Reform Bill Of 1867 (1660-1867). Carlisle.

Baronetage of England
Preceded by Wilfrid Lawson	Baronet (of Isell); 1762–1794	Succeeded by Wilfrid Lawson
