= Sir Wilfrid Lawson, 10th Baronet =

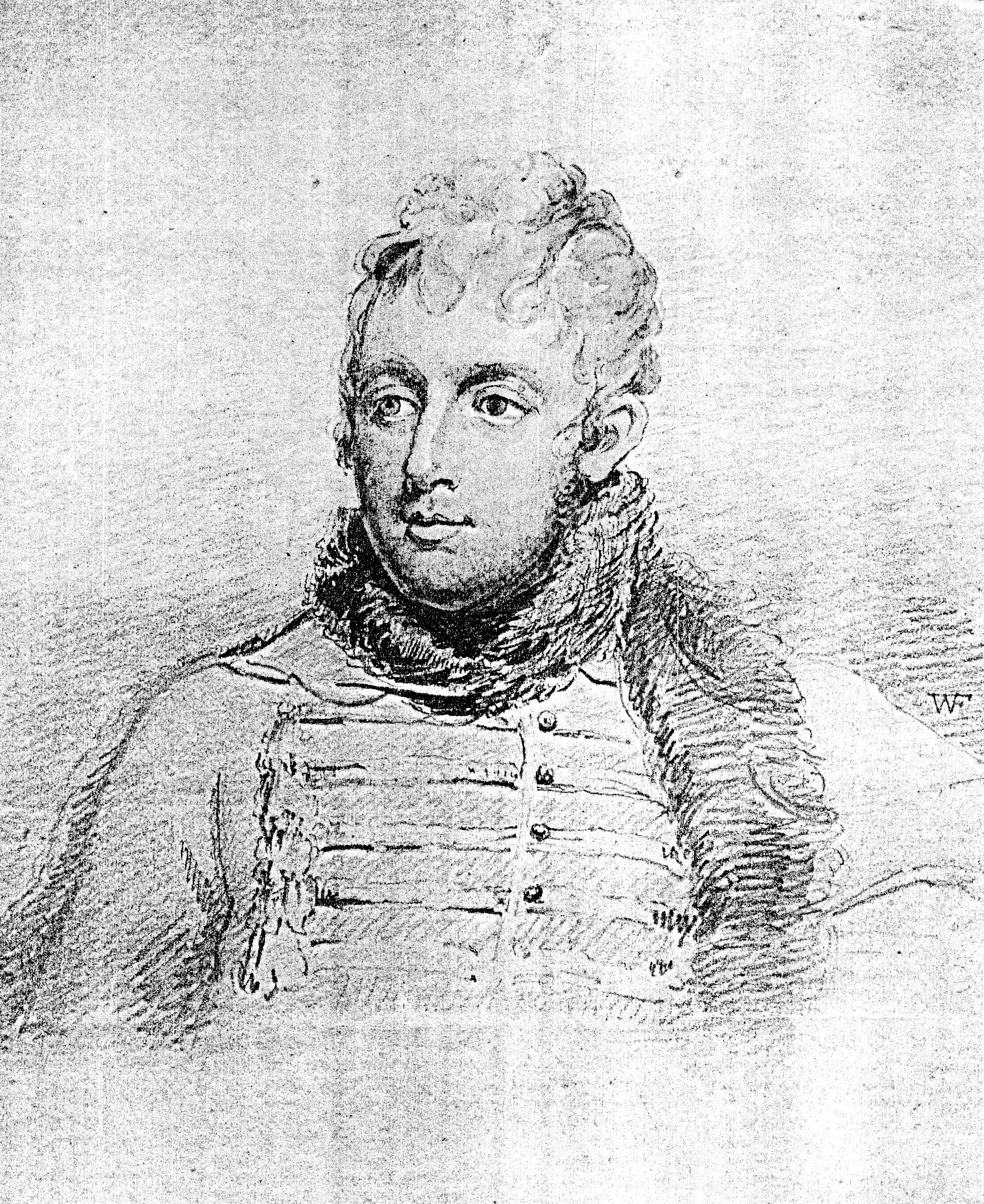
Sir Wilfrid Lawson, 10th Baronet of Isell

Sir Wilfrid Lawson, 10th Baronet of Isel, MA (Cantab) (1764 – 1806), was a leading Cumberland landowner. He was one of the Lawson Baronets. He was educated at St John's College, Cambridge.

Sir Wilfrid Lawson was born at Aspatria in 1764. In 1787, he married Anne, second daughter of John Hartley of Whitehaven. Lawson was a patron of the fine arts, and according to descriptions of his collection, a man possessed with a keen eye and good judgement. He carried influence, for he entertained Samuel Taylor Coleridge and other Lake Poets. Coleridge described him as, "an extremely liberal and good-natured Creature", the owner of a "Kingly mansion at Braighton," who "never lets money stand in the way of his inclinations."

His prints alone, cost him a significant sum of money. According to Coleridge he was a shrewd negotiator, "tho’ he would not make a fool of himself by giving an extravagant price, yet he would bid hard." He also owned one of the most elegant and extensive Libraries in the North of England, with particular reference to Natural History. "In Voyages, Travels, and books of Natural History it is no doubt the first in the island-next to that of Sir Joseph Banks."

Lawson was also a botanist of some repute and took a general interest in collecting rare and curious plants, of which he often exhibited at local Feats and Balls. He was an enthusiastic collector of military armour and owned one of the finest collections in England. In 1797, he increased the size of his estate and three years later enlarged the old manor house, laying out extensive botanical gardens, comprising about 350 acres (140 ha). He also created a lake covering about 8 acres (3.2 ha). Although never a politician, Lawson served the public in a number of ways. He was appointed Sheriff of Cumberland for 1801–02, and at the time of his death enjoyed the rank of a Major in the Loyal Cumberland Rangers.

While visiting Buxton in Derbyshire on 21 June 1806, he developed an illness and died unexpectedly. Having no issue the Baronetcy expired and the estates passed to his wife's nephew, Thomas Wyberg. Lawson's obituary gives some indication of his character and life.

The remains of the late Sir Wilfrid Lawson, Bart. of Brayton House, were privately interred at Aspatria, on Thursday last. The death of Sir Wilfrid is universally regretted and indeed not without reason: as he was an estimable character, possessing hospitality, munificence and all the social virtues in a high degree. He was a friend to the poor and - to his honour be it recorded - he distributed weekly a great quantity of potatoes, butchers meat etc., to the poor in the neighbourhood during the scarcity which prevailed a few years ago.

The Dowager Lady Lawson died on 5 December 1811, aged 47. Her remains were interred in Aspatria Churchyard.

== Eponyms ==
- Erica lawsonia Andrews

== Bibliography ==
- Samuel Taylor Coleridge (2000). Earl Leslie Griggs (ed.). Collected Letters of Samuel Taylor Coleridge. Oxford.
- Mannix; Whelan (1847). History, Gazetteer & Directory of Cumberland 1847. Whitehaven.
- William Hutchinson (1797). The History Of Cumberland Vol. 2. London.

Baronetage of England
Preceded by Gilfrid Lawson	Baronet (of Isell); 1794–1806	Extinct
