= Listed buildings in Blindcrake =

Blindbothel is a civil parish in the Cumberland district in Cumbria, England. It contains 31 listed buildings that are recorded in the National Heritage List for England. Of these, two are listed at Grade I, the highest of the three grades, one is at Grade II*, the middle grade, and the others are at Grade II, the lowest grade. The parish is almost completely rural. It contains the village of Blindcrake, the hamlets of Redmain and Sunderland, and the scattered settlement of Isel. Almost all the listed buildings are in or near these settlements, and most of them are houses and associated structures, or farmhouse and farm buildings. The other listed buildings are a church, a table tomb in the churchyard, a bridge, a milestone, a watermill, and a covered well.

== Key ==
Grade	Criteria
I	Buildings of exceptional interest, sometimes considered to be internationally important
II*	Particularly important buildings of more than special interest
II	Buildings of national importance and special interest

== Buildings ==
Name and location	Photograph	Date	Notes	Grade
St Michael's Church; 54.68786°N 3.30089°W		Early 12th century	The church was restored in 1878 by C. J. Ferguson. It is in calciferous sandstone with a green slate roof, and consists of a nave with a south porch, and a chancel with a north vestry. On the west gable is a double bellcote. The doorway is Norman in style.	I
Isel Hall; 54.69106°N 3.30707°W		Late 14th or early 15th century	A tower house with a hall added in the late 15th century and a further extension in the 16th century. The roofs are of green slate. The tower house has thick walls of calciferous sandstone. It is in three storeys with a vaulted basement, and has quoins, windows, loops, and an embattled parapet. The hall and extension are in calciferous and red sandstone, they contain doorways and windows with Tudor arched heads, and have parapets with shaped finials. The hall has two storeys and five bays, and the extension has three storeys and six bays.	I
Table tomb 54.68778°N 3.30071°W	—	Late 15th century	The table tomb is in the churchyard of St Michael's Church. It is in sandstone, and is carved with trefoils and shields. The tomb is thought to be that of Sir William Leigh of Isel Hall, who died in 1484, The tomb was originally inside the church.	II*
Redmain Hall; 54.69318°N 3.33743°W	—	Mid or late 16th century	A roughcast farmhouse with a green slate roof, in three storeys and two bays. On the front is a 19th-century gabled porch. The windows in the upper two floors are mullioned; in the ground floor there is a 20th-century window in its original surround, and on the right side the surround has been widened and it contains a sash window. There is also an outshut with mullioned windows.	II
Stable flats and former Carriage House, Isel Hall; 54.69114°N 3.30819°W	—	Mid 17th century	The stable and carriage house, parts of which date from the 19th century, have been converted for other uses. They are in sandstone with green slate roofs. The stable has two storeys and five bays, with four lower bays to the right. The doorways have Tudor arched doorways, and the windows are casements, some with retained mullions. The lower part has a loft door, and against its front is a mounting block. The coach house has quoins, four segmental-arched doorways, and casement windows.	II
Barn and former cottage, Croft House; 54.69260°N 3.33865°W	—	1691	The cottage and attached barn are in rubble stone with green slate roofs. The cottage has two storeys and two bays. The doorway and casement windows have chamfered surrounds. Over the doorway is an inscription and above this is an oval opening. The barn to the left has a blocked doorway converted into a window, ventilation slits, and a 20th-century garage door.	II
Grange Farmhouse and barn, Blindcrake; 54.70142°N 3.32301°W	—	Early 18th century	The farmhouse and barn are roughcast. The house has a roof of green slate, a coped left gable, a glazed doorway and sash windows with painted surrounds, and a plank door. The barn to the right has a roof of Welsh slate, and contains a plank door and ventilation slits.	II
Blindcrake Hall; 54.70065°N 3.32296°W	—	1728	A roughcast house with quoins and a green slate roof, and with an extension that has a tiled roof. There are two storeys and five bays. The doorway has a fanlight, and the windows are sashes, and all have architraves.	II
Low Farmhouse and barns 54.70013°N 3.32372°W	—	1729	The farmhouse and barns are roughcast with green slate roofs. The house has two storeys and two bays. It has a doorway with an architrave and sash windows. The barns to the right form an L-shaped plan, and contain doors, a loft door, and ventilation slits.	II
High Farmhouse and barn 54.70324°N 3.32010°W	—	1730	The farmhouse and barns have green slate roof. The house is rendered with two storeys and two bays. The doorway has an architrave and the windows are casements. The barn, attached to the left has a projecting extension. It is in calciferous sandstone and boulder rubble, and contains doorways with alternate-block surrounds, casement windows, and ventilation slits. (Note: Street View in May 2009 shows that the barn has been converted for domestic use.)	II
Low House; 54.70719°N 3.27530°W	—	1735	A roughcast farmhouse with a green slate roof, in two storeys and three bays. It contains a doorway with a dated and inscribed lintel, sash windows, and a 20th-century garage door.	II
Grecian House, Beech Farmhouse and barn 54.70803°N 3.27448°W	—	1740	The houses and barn are roughcast with roofs in green slate. Originally one house, it was later divided into two; both have two storeys and contain sash windows. Grecian House has five bays and a doorway with an architrave. Beech House, at right angles to the left, has a doorway with a fanlight and a round-headed stair window above it. The barn contains doorways and a cart entrance.	II
Grange Farmhouse and barn, Redmain; 54.69307°N 3.33811°W	—	1745	Both the farmhouse and the barn have green slate roofs. The house is roughcast with quoins, and has two storeys and six bays. The doorway has an architrave with a frieze and cornice, and the windows are sashes, also with architraves. The barn, recessed and to the right, is dated 1812, and is in calciferous sandstone. It contains a central segmental arch, doorways, a loft door, and oval vents, all with sandstone surrounds.	II
Croft House, Sunderland; 54.70781°N 3.27534°W	—	1750	A rendered farmhouse with a green slate roof, in two storeys and three bays. On the front are two doorways, one dating from the 20th century, and the windows are sashes, all with painted stone surrounds.	II
Croft House, Redmain; 54.69241°N 3.33874°W	—	Mid 18th century	A rendered farmhouse with quoins, an eaves cornice, and a green slate roof with coped gables. It has two storeys and three bays, a doorway with architraves, and sash windows.	II
Holly House and barn 54.70872°N 3.27372°W	—	Mid 18th century	The farmhouse and barn have green slate roofs. The house is rendered, and is in two storeys and two bays. On the front is a doorway with an architrave and a 20th-century stone porch, and the windows are casements, also with architraves. The barn to the right is roughcast, and has a through archway, doors, and ventilation slits. In front of the barn is a mounting block in rubble with flag steps.	II
Barn, Redmain Hall; 54.69305°N 3.33753°W	—	Mid 18th century	The barn is in calciferous sandstone rubble with quoins, and a green slate roof with coped gables. It has a cart entrance with a segmental head, doorways, a loft door, and ventilation slits.	II
Croft House and barn, Blindcrake; 54.69936°N 3.32367°W	—	Late 18th century	A farmhouse and barn, roughcast with a green slate roof. The house has two storeys, three bays, and sash windows. The barn to the right has doorways, casement windows, a loft door, and ventilation slits. On the right return is a projecting cart entrance. (Note: Street View in May 2009 shows that the barn has been converted for domestic use.)	II
Westgate Farmhouse and barns 54.69894°N 3.32411°W	—	Late 18th century	The farmhouse is rendered with quoins and a green slate roof. It has two storeys and three bays, and contains a doorway with an alternate-block surround, and sash windows with architraves. Attached to the right are two barns at right angles to each other. They contain doorways, casement windows, a loft door, and ventilation slits.	II
Westray House; 54.70627°N 3.27398°W	—	Late 18th century	A rendered farmhouse in two storeys and two bays. It has a 20th-century door with a fanlight, and sash windows, all in painted stone surrounds.	II
Isel Bridge House and former stables 54.68814°N 3.29945°W	—	c. 1785	Originally a vicarage and stables, later converted into two dwellings. The building is rendered with angle pilasters and green slate roofs. There are two storeys and a main range of three bays, flanked by lower wings. Attached at right angles to the right wing are the former stables. The doorway to the house has a 20th-century trellis porch, and the windows are sashes. In the former stables are large doors, casement windows, sliding sash windows, and ventilation slits.	II
Gate piers and garden walls, Isel Hall; 54.69134°N 3.30728°W	—	Late 18th or early 19th century	The square gate piers are in calciferous and red sandstone. They are rusticated with ball finials. The piers are flanked by low coped brick walls, with ball finials and carved stone crests. Towards the house are terrace steps.	II
Milestone; 54.70989°N 3.32233°W	—	Late 18th or early 19th century	The milestone was provided for the Carlisle-Cockermouth Turnpike. It is in sandstone, and has a round top, a curved face, and a cast iron plate. The plate is inscribed with the distances in miles to Carlisle, Wigton and Cockermouth.	II
Isel Bridge; 54.68774°N 3.29807°W		1812	The bridge carries a road over the River Derwent. It is built in calciferous and pink sandstone, and consists of three segmental arches on two piers with splayed cutwaters. The bridge has solid parapets with saddleback coping.	II
Croft Cottage; 54.69226°N 3.33896°W	—	Early 19th century	A rendered cottage with a green slate roof and coped gables. It has 1 1/2 storeys and two bays. The windows are sashes in painted stone surrounds.	II
Gates, wall and railings, Isel Bridge House; 54.68818°N 3.29887°W	—	Early 19th century	The gate piers and walls are in calciferous and red sandstone with some brick. The gate piers are square with ball finials. The low walls have chamfered coping and carry simple cast iron railings with looped tops.	II
Isel Grange; 54.69199°N 3.30883°W	—	Early 19th century	Originally one house, later divided into three flats. The front is in sandstone with quoins, and the rest of the house is stuccoed with angle pilasters. It has two storeys and an H-shaped plan, consisting of a main range and three-bay wings. The doorways have fanlights and the windows are sashes, all with painted surrounds.	II
Isel Mill; 54.69396°N 3.30703°W	—	Mid 19th century	A sandstone watermill with a pilaster to the right, and quoins on the left, and with a green slate roof. It has two storeys and two bays, an extension to the left, and a lower wheelhouse at the right. There are external steps leading up to a first floor doorway. Inside the wheelhouse is an overshot wheel.	II
Byre, Isel Mill; 54.69378°N 3.30691°W	—	Mid 19th century	The byre is in sandstone with quoins and a green slate roof. It is in a single storey, and has two bays with lower extensions on each side. All parts contain plank doors, and in the central section are oval vents.	II
Isel Mill House and granary 54.69379°N 3.30728°W	—	Mid 19th century	The house and attached granary are in sandstone with a green slate roof. The house has two storeys and three bays. In the house are sash windows, and both parts contain plank doors.	II
Covered well 54.70119°N 3.32263°W	—	Late 19th century	The well is in sandstone. It consists of a circular well head with a domed cover and it has an iron grille at the side.	II

== Notes and references ==
=== Sources ===
- Historic England, "Church of St Michael, Blindcrake (1145219)", National Heritage List for England
- Historic England, "Isel Hall, Blindcrake (1137970)", National Heritage List for England
- Historic England, "Table tomb south of chancel of Church of St Michael, Blindcrake (1312018)", National Heritage List for England
- Historic England, "Redmain Hall, Blindcrake (1138041)", National Heritage List for England
- Historic England, "Stable flats and former Carriage House at Isel Hall, Blindcrake (1145216)", National Heritage List for England
- Historic England, "Barn and former cottage north of Croft House, Blindcrake (1138033)", National Heritage List for England
- Historic England, "Grange Farmhouse and barn adjoining, Blindcrake (1326826)", National Heritage List for England
- Historic England, "Blindcrake Hall (1326865)", National Heritage List for England
- Historic England, "Low Farmhouse and barns adjoining, Blindcrake (1137962)", National Heritage List for England
- Historic England, "High Farmhouse and barn adjoining, Blindcrake (1145215)", National Heritage List for England
- Historic England, "Low House, Blindcrake (1145225)", National Heritage List for England
- Historic England, "Grecian House, Beech Farmhouse and barn adjoining, Blindcrake (1326828)", National Heritage List for England
- Historic England, "Grange Farmhouse and barn adjoining, Blindcrake (1326827)", National Heritage List for England
- Historic England, "Croft House, Blindcrake (1138054)", National Heritage List for England
- Historic England, "Croft House, Blindcrake (1145222)", National Heritage List for England
- Historic England, "Holly House and barn adjoining, Blindcrake (1138047)", National Heritage List for England
- Historic England, "Barn behind Redmain Hall, Blindcrake (1145224)", National Heritage List for England
- Historic England, "Croft House and Barn adjoining, Blindcrake (1137956)", National Heritage List for England
- Historic England, "Westgate Farmhouse and adjoining barns, Blindcrake (1145214)", National Heritage List for England
- Historic England, "Westray House, Blindcrake (1138064)", National Heritage List for England
- Historic England, "Milestone opposite Moota Inn, Blindcrake (1312023)", National Heritage List for England
- Historic England, "Isel Bridge House and former stables, Blindcrake (1145220)", National Heritage List for England
- Historic England, "Croft Cottage, Blindcrake (1145223)", National Heritage List for England
- Historic England, "Gate piers and garden walls in front of Isel Hall, Blindcrake (1137985)", National Heritage List for England
- Historic England, "Isel Bridge, Blindcrake (1145221)", National Heritage List for England
- Historic England, "Gates, wall and railings of Isel Bridge House, Blindcrake (1138024)", National Heritage List for England
- Historic England, "Isel Grange, Blindcrake (1145217)", National Heritage List for England
- Historic England, "Isel Mill, Blindcrake (1145218)", National Heritage List for England
- Historic England, "Byre south of Isel Mill, Blindcrake (1312046)", National Heritage List for England
- Historic England, "Isel Mill House and granary adjoining, Blindcrake (1312044)", National Heritage List for England
- Historic England, "Covered well behind Telephone Call Box in centre of Blindcrake (1137944)", National Heritage List for England
- Historic England, Listed Buildings
- Hyde, Matthew; Pevsner, Nikolaus (2010) [1967], Cumbria, The Buildings of England, New Haven and London: Yale University Press, ISBN 978-0-300-12663-1
