= Lawson baronets of Brough Hall (first creation, 1665) =

Escutcheon of the Lawson baronets of Brough Hall, first creation

The Lawson baronetcy, of Brough Hall in the County of York, was created in the Baronetage of England on 6 July 1665 for John Lawson, of Brough Hall. He was the son of Henry Lawson and his wife Ann Hodgson of Hebburn, and had been a Captain of Horse for Charles I of Great Britain.

The title became extinct on the death of the 6th Baronet in January 1834. His estate at Lartington Hall passed to his nephew Henry Thomas Maire (Silvertop) Witham, son of his sister Catherine. The Brough Hall estate passed to his great-nephew, in whose favour the baronetcy was revived in 1841.

== Lawson baronets, of Brough Hall (1665) ==
- Sir John Lawson, 1st Baronet (1627–1698)
- Sir Henry Lawson, 2nd Baronet (1663–1720)
- Sir John Lawson, 3rd Baronet (1689–1739)
- Sir Henry Lawson, 4th Baronet (1712–1781)
- Sir John Lawson, 5th Baronet (1744–1811)
- Sir Henry Lawson, 6th Baronet (1750–1834)
