= Blindcrake =

Village and civil parish in Cumbria, England

Coordinates: 54.696°N 3.300°W

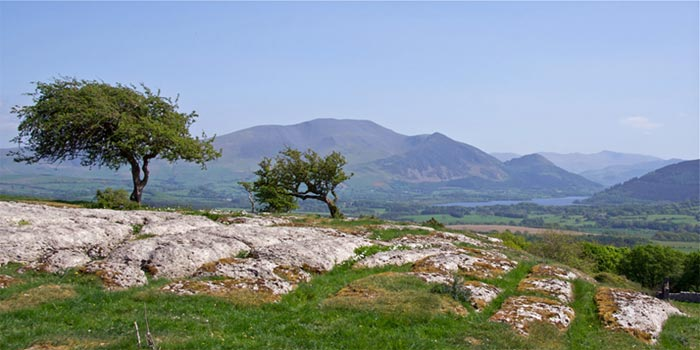
- Clints Crag above Blindcrake

- Location in Allerdale, Cumbria Location within Cumbria
- Population: 348 (2011 Census)
- OS grid reference: NY 14830 34771
- Civil parish: Blindcrake
- Unitary authority: Cumberland
- Ceremonial county: Cumbria
- Region: North West
- Country: England
- Sovereign state: United Kingdom
- Post town: COCKERMOUTH
- Postcode district: CA13
- Dialling code: 01900; 016973; 017687
- Police: Cumbria
- Fire: Cumbria
- Ambulance: North West
- UK Parliament: Penrith and Solway

Blindcrake is a village and civil parish within the Isel Valley, in the Lake District National Park, in Cumbria, England, historically part of Cumberland. According to the 2001 census it had a population of 287, increasing to 348 at the 2011 Census. The parish includes Blindcrake village and the hamlets of Redmain, Isel and Sunderland.

Blindcrake village is one of 23 designated conservation areas of the National Park Planning Authority. this status is largely based on its mediaeval strip field pattern which is described as "undoubtedly the finest example of its type in the Lake District".

== Governance ==
Blindcrake is within the Penrith and Solway UK parliamentary constituency.

For Local Government purposes it is in the Cumberland unitary authority area.

Blindcrake has its own Parish Council; Blindcrake Parish Council.

== Toponymy ==
The name Blindcrake was recorded in 1246 as Blenckrayk, and is of Brittonic origin. The first element is blajn, in place-names generally meaning "summit" (Welsh blaen). The second is crẹ:g, meaning "a crag" or "prominent rock" (Welsh craig).

== History ==
Blindcrake is on the site of an Ancient Settlement (possibly dating back to the Iron Age), and a mediaeval field system is in evidence in the northwest sector of the village. Its 70-odd houses are spread on either side of the main street through the village and date from the 18th century. Four working farms are currently functioning in the village. There is a village green and a smaller green with a mediaeval well (which has Grade II listed status). The village features regularly in the annual Cumbria in Bloom awards and also holds its own open garden festival – the Garden Safari – in late June. Blindcrake Village won the 1999 Environment Millennium Heritage Award (Green Apple Awards) for "The Top Beauty Spot in the British Isles" for the traditional village that retains tradition while looking towards the future. Its history was commemorated in a book, now out of print – A History and Survey of Blindcrake, Isel and Redmain (H. E. Winter, 2nd ed., 1988) and a photographic survey of the houses and then residents of the parish was also published privately for the millennium. The book was the idea of Mrs Isobel McGuffie who edited the contributions with the help of Alan Brentnall. The photographs were by Michael Dawson.

The 11th century parish church, St Michael and All Angels, that serves the community is located in Isel, about a mile south-east of Blindcrake on the banks of the River Derwent. It holds a harvest festival. Isel School that served the community since 1674 (now a private home) is located halfway between the two villages. The main village pub, the Ghyll Yeat Inn, was formerly the toll house to the Isel Estate but closed as a pub in 2000 and is now a private home.

Isel Hall is the centre of the Isel Estate and stands on a steep slope above the River Derwent, with its south facing terraces overlooking the river. The oldest part is the Border pele tower, a fortified structure built around 1400 on the site of a much older structure probably destroyed when the Scots raided Cockermouth in 1387. The house was lived in by the Leigh family from the early 14th century to 1573 when the house passed to the Lawsons who lived there until 1986. It is now the private home of Miss Mary Burkett OBE, formerly director of Abbot Hall in Kendal, but is open to the public for guided tours on Monday afternoons from the last Monday in March to the first Monday in October.

Burkett compiled a memoir of a former parlourmaid at Isel Hall, Miss May Moore (I Was Only A Maid – the life of a remarkable woman, Firpress Ltd., Workington), who also featured in a Border TV documentary filmed at the Hall in 1997. May Moore was in service to Sir Wilfred and Lady Lawson in the 1920s, from the age of 13. As well as cleaning and other duties, she was persuaded to drive the family Daimler to Carlisle to collect provisions when she was 14 years old. May was later head housemaid in Coniston, regularly cycling the 39 miles (63 km) across the Lake District to visit her mother in Blindcrake. While at Coniston she was befriended by Beatrix Potter (Mrs. Heelis), cutting her hair, sewing clothes and cleaning at Hilltop. May finally returned to Skiddaw View, Blindcrake, to help her sister in looking after her mother and spent the rest of the 17 years of her working life as a machinist at a local clothing factory. After retirement she helped out at Isel Hall as a guide – recounting at first hand, with a remarkable facility to relive past events, the way of life in the early part of the 20th century. The village hosted a 90th birthday party for her in the village hall in 1997. Moore died in 2003 at the age of 96.

Blindcrake has seven grade-II listed dwellings, mostly built in the early 18th century. In 1750 the Isel estate built a row of cottages in Blindcrake. The two end cottages were used in the 19th century for bacon curing (downstairs) and a primitive Methodist meeting room (upstairs). In 1894 the Methodist group bought the building and made it into a chapel; it is now a private home. The village hall is housed in the remainder of this row. Allison House, a large farmhouse built in 1724, is named after the Allison family who were prominent in the area. Blindcrake Hall, in the middle of the village, is another large house that dates from the same period (1728). Thorneycroft is reputedly the oldest building in the village, bearing a datestone of 1613.

== Geography ==
The village is some 4 miles (6.4 km) north-east of Cockermouth off the old Roman road to Carlisle (A595) and above the River Derwent. It is 12 miles (19 km) from Keswick and, along the A66, it is 29 miles (47 km) from the M6 motorway at Penrith. It lies near the northernmost boundary of the Lake District National Park and the village is situated in an elevated position (max 558 ft; 170 m) on the south facing slopes of the Isel Valley, giving the area panoramas of the Skiddaw and Buttermere fells of the Lake District.

Eurasian oystercatcher, Eurasian curlew, northern lapwing, Eurasian skylark, common cuckoo, northern wheatear, pied flycatcher, Eurasian siskin and hawfinch are just some of the 94 species of birds seen in the area. There are a large variety of butterflies in the countryside around the village, most notably the nationally rare pearl-bordered fritillary and the small pearl-bordered fritillary due to the mixture of upland, woodland and meadow habitats that are found. Common blue, wall brown, speckled wood, and small copper can also be regularly seen as well as many of the more common butterflies. There are many mammals in the area too, red squirrels, roe deer, foxes and badgers can all be regularly seen in woodland.

== Walking ==
Clints Crags and its limestone pavement (807 ft; 246 m), an area of special scientific interest, is located about a mile from the village up a public Footpath. The summit has outstanding views across the whole Lake District, with a vista from the Ennerdale Fells in the west, to the Helvellyn range to the south east. Its ascent is included in one of Alfred Wainwright's books, The Outlying Fells of Lakeland, which he dedicated to "the old-timers on the fells" (Frances Lincoln Press Ltd., 2007). The Allerdale Ramble walking route also traverses the parish from west to east following the north bank of the Derwent down towards Bassenthwaite Lake.

== Climate ==
The Isel valley has a temperate climate like much of the UK. However, it is one of the driest and sunniest parts of the Lake District. Summers are typically warm with some rain, with late spring to mid-summer tending to be the driest time of the year. Winters can be mild and wet, but due to the areas topography, a cold winter such as the winter of 2009–2010 will give the area lower temperatures and much more snow than areas further north and west. The sheltered valley acts as a frost hollow in winter, with regular temperature inversions leading to valley fog while higher up the slopes of the valley it stays clear. In summer the south facing slopes and sheltered valley bottom will achieve warmer temperatures than surrounding areas, but this is lost with rising elevation due to the cooling effects of increasing height above sea level.

Climate data for Isel valley, Lake District
Month	Jan	Feb	Mar	Apr	May	Jun	Jul	Aug	Sep	Oct	Nov	Dec	Year
Record high °C (°F)	15 (59)	18 (64)	21 (70)	26 (79)	28 (82)	30 (86)	31 (88)	30 (86)	29 (84)	25 (77)	20 (68)	16 (61)	31 (88)
Mean daily maximum °C (°F)	3.5 (38.3)	4.5 (40.1)	9 (48)	12 (54)	16 (61)	18 (64)	20 (68)	19 (66)	17 (63)	13 (55)	8 (46)	4.5 (40.1)	12.0 (53.6)
Mean daily minimum °C (°F)	0.5 (32.9)	0.5 (32.9)	2 (36)	4 (39)	7 (45)	9 (48)	12 (54)	11 (52)	9 (48)	6 (43)	4 (39)	0.5 (32.9)	5.5 (41.9)
Record low °C (°F)	−18 (0)	−15 (5)	−10 (14)	−8 (18)	−3 (27)	1 (34)	4 (39)	3 (37)	−1 (30)	−9 (16)	−11 (12)	−15 (5)	−18 (0)
Average precipitation mm (inches)	96 (3.8)	79 (3.1)	90 (3.5)	55 (2.2)	61 (2.4)	67 (2.6)	72 (2.8)	85 (3.3)	108 (4.3)	120 (4.7)	118 (4.6)	112 (4.4)	1,063 (41.9)
Average snowy days	10	8	8	4	1	0	0	0	0	1	4	9	45
Mean monthly sunshine hours	44	73	112	155	214	203	190	180	135	94	61	35	1,496

== See also ==
- Listed buildings in Blindcrake
