= Thomas Pengelly (judge) =

British lawyer, judge, novelist and MP

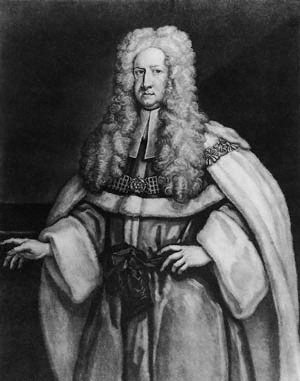
Sir Thomas Pengelly by John Faber the Younger (1730)

Sir Thomas Pengelly (16 May 1675 – 14 April 1730) was a British lawyer, judge, novelist and later the Member of Parliament for Cockermouth, serving from 1722 to 1727, and Lord Justice of Appeal in 1726.

== Early years ==
Born and baptised on 16 May 1675, Thomas Pengelly was the son of Thomas Pengelly, a prosperous London-based merchant, and his wife, Rachel Baines.

By 1683, the family's home in Hereford had provided lodgings for the former Protector Richard Cromwell after the Restoration of the Monarchy. On the death of Thomas Pengelly Snr. in 1696, Cromwell continued to lodge with Mrs Pengelly, moving with her to her property in Cheshunt in Hertfordshire in 1700, and remaining there until his own death in 1712. This arrangement created a rumour that the younger Thomas Pengelly was his son.

== Legal and political career ==
Pengelly, was apprenticed as a clerk in an Attorney at Law’s office in London in 1691 aged 16, and was admitted to the Inner Temple in 1692. He was Called to the Bar on 24 November 1700, and in 1710 he was created a Serjeant-at-law. By 1720 he was regarded as one of the leading Advocates practising in Westminster Hall where he was widely known as an authority in Corporate law. By 1717 Pengelly had become the foremost legal adviser to the Duke of Somerset, and during the 1720s he was also legal adviser to the Duchess of Marlborough when she became involved in court cases concerning the Blenheim estate, which she had inherited from her father, the first Duke of Marlborough. On 1 May 1719 Pengelly was knighted and appointed Prime Serjeant to King George I. As Prime Serjeant he was involved in the trial of the Jacobite plotter Christopher Layer for high treason in early 1722.

Pengelly was re-elected as the Member of Parliament for Cockermouth in 1722. During his five years in Parliament he was involved in various legal matters, including pursuing the directors of the South Sea Company. In 1725 he was involved in the impeachment of the Lord Chancellor, Lord Macclesfield, who had sold positions to several Masters of Chancery and who, in an attempt to regain the high cost of the bribes required to buy their offices, had subsequently invested and lost their clients' money in the South Sea Bubble crash. In 1726 he was also involved in the expulsion from the House of Commons of John Ward, whom he had prosecuted for defrauding the Duke of Buckingham.

On 16 October 1726 he was appointed as Lord Chief Baron of the Exchequer and thereby obliged to give up his parliamentary seat.

He died unmarried and childless at Blandford in Dorset on 14 April 1730, and was buried in the Temple Church on 29 April. In his will he left £2890 for the discharge of poor prisoners on the Western Circuit and in London.

Legal offices
Preceded by Sir Jeffrey Gilbert	Chief Baron of the Exchequer; 1726–1730	Succeeded by Sir James Reynolds, junior
Parliament of Great Britain
Preceded by James Stanhope; Nicholas Lechmere	Member of Parliament for Cockermouth; 1717–1727; With: Nicholas Lechmere to July 1717; Lord Percy Seymour July 1717 – 1721; Anthony Lowther 1721–22; Sir Wilfrid Lawson, Bt from 1722	Succeeded by William Finch; Sir Wilfrid Lawson, Bt
