= Treaty of Hanover (1710) =

1710 treaty between Russia and Brunswick

The Treaty of Hanover was concluded on 3 July 1710, during the Great Northern War. It allied the Russian Empire with Brunswick-Lüneburg (Hanover). Though Hanover was not among the most important states of the Holy Roman Empire, the alliance was important since the Hanoveranian duke, with whom the alliance was concluded, was subsequently to become king of Great Britain as George I.

== Sources ==
- Iskenderov, Akhmed Akhmedovich; Raleigh, Donald J. (1996). The emperors and empresses of Russia. Rediscovering the Romanovs. The New Russian history. Sharpe. p. 20. ISBN 1-56324-759-3.
