= Sunderland, Cumbria =

Hamlet in Cumbria, England

Coordinates: 54.707°N 3.275°W

Sunderland
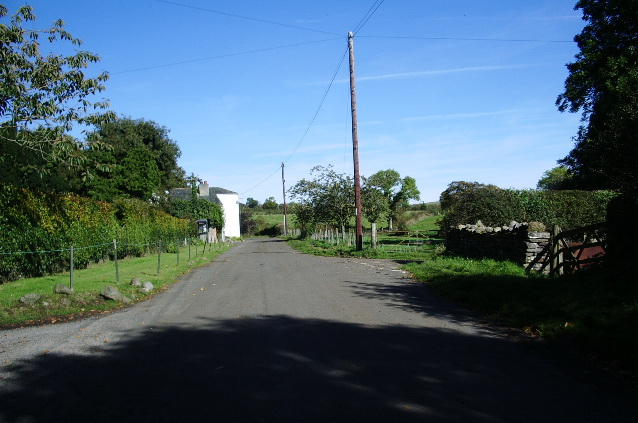
- Sunderland

- Location in Allerdale, Cumbria Location within Cumbria
- OS grid reference: NY178354
- Civil parish: Blindcrake
- Unitary authority: Cumberland
- Ceremonial county: Cumbria
- Region: North West
- Country: England
- Sovereign state: United Kingdom
- Post town: Cockermouth
- Postcode district: CA13
- Dialling code: 01768
- Police: Cumbria
- Fire: Cumbria
- Ambulance: North West
- UK Parliament: Penrith and Solway

Sunderland is a hamlet and former civil parish, within the Lake District National Park, now in the parish of Blindcrake in the Cumberland unitary authority district of the county of Cumbria, England, historically part of Cumberland. In 1931 the parish had a population of 60.

== Nearby settlements ==
Nearby settlements include the towns of Cockermouth, Keswick, Bothel and Aspatria. The nearest railway station is Aspatria railway station.

== Governance ==
Sunderland is within the Penrith and Solway UK Parliamentary constituency.

Regarding its Parish Council, on 1 April 1934 the civil parish was abolished and it merged with Blindcrake, Isel and Redmaine, and Isel Old Park to form Blindcrake.

== See also ==
- Listed buildings in Blindcrake
