= Thomas Pengelly (merchant) =

British merchant

Thomas Pengelly (fl. c.1650 – 6 January 1696) was a wealthy English merchant of the 17th century who traded with the Eastern Mediterranean and the Atlantic Seaboard. He owned property in the East End of London, as well as in Finchley and in Cheshunt in Hertfordshire.

Pengelly married Rachel, the daughter of Lieutenant-Colonel Jeremy Baines, a Parliamentary Officer during the Civil War. Their son was to become the judge and Member of Parliament for Cockermouth Sir Thomas Pengelly; he was born in the family's property at Moorfields in 1675. By 1683 the family's home in Finchley had provided lodgings for the former Protector Richard Cromwell after the Restoration of the Monarchy.

On the death of Thomas Pengelly in 1696, Cromwell continued to lodge with Mrs Pengelly, moving with her to her property in Cheshunt in Hertfordshire in 1700, and remaining there until his own death in 1712. This arrangement created a rumour that the younger Thomas Pengelly was Richard Cromwell's illegitimate son.
