= Lawson baronets of Brough Hall (second creation, 1841) =

Escutcheon of the Lawson baronets of Brough Hall

The Lawson, later Howard-Lawson baronetcy, of Brough Hall in the County of York, was created in the Baronetage of the United Kingdom on 8 September 1841 for William Lawson. Born William Wright, he was the son of John Wright, of Kelvedon, by Elizabeth Lawson, daughter of the 5th Baronet of the 1665 creation whose surname he assumed in lieu of his Wright. His mother had previously inherited the Lawson family seat of Brough Hall.

The 3rd Baronet married Ursula Mary Howard in 1899. She was the only living heir of Sir Philip John Canning Howard, of Corby Castle, Cumberland; a descendant of Sir Francis Howard (1588–1660), son of Lord William Howard. The 6th Baronet assumed by Royal Licence in 1962 the Howard name and arms and then resumed use of the Lawson name in 1992.

On the death of the 4th Baronet in 1975 Brough Hall was left to his two daughters, Valerie Worthington (née Lawson) and Jill Lawson. The title passed to his younger brother William, the 5th Baronet, and the seat moved to Corby Castle, Cumbria, ancestral home of Sir Francis Howard. Corby Castle was sold in 1994 to Lord Ballyedmond. In 2010, Philip Howard, the son of Sir John Philip Howard-Lawson, 6th Baronet, sued the latter for unlawfully selling Corby Castle. It was reported in February and March 2012 that the suit had been rejected by the original court and again at appeal, and that Philip Howard was intending to pursue it in the Supreme Court.

== Lawson, later Howard-Lawson baronets, of Brough Hall (1841) ==
- Sir William Lawson, 1st Baronet (1796–1865)
- Sir John Lawson, 2nd Baronet (1829–1910)
- Sir Henry Joseph Lawson, 3rd Baronet (1877–1947)
- Sir Ralph Henry Lawson, 4th Baronet (1905–1975)
- Sir William Howard Lawson, 5th Baronet (1907–1990)
- Sir John Philip Howard-Lawson, 6th Baronet (1934–2026)
- Sir Philip William Howard, 7th Baronet (born 1961)

The heir presumptive is the current holder's brother, Thomas John Howard (born 1963).
