= Isel, Cumbria =

Settlement in Cumbria, England

Coordinates: 54.694°N 3.279°W

Isel
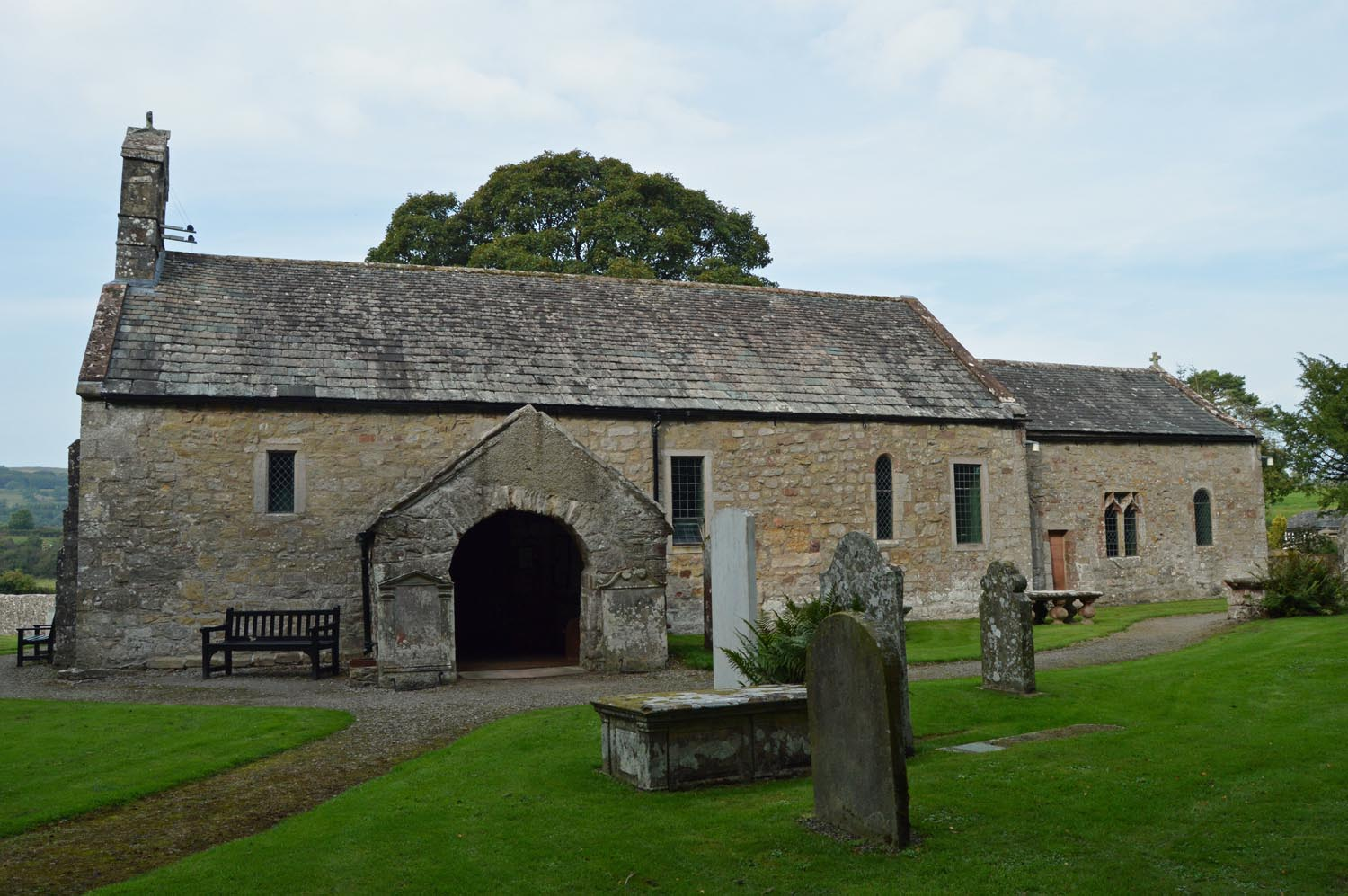
- St Michael and All Angels' Church, Isel

- Location in Allerdale, Cumbria Location within Cumbria
- OS grid reference: NY158338
- Civil parish: Blindcrake
- Unitary authority: Cumberland
- Ceremonial county: Cumbria
- Region: North West
- Country: England
- Sovereign state: United Kingdom
- Post town: COCKERMOUTH
- Postcode district: CA13
- Dialling code: 01900 / 017687
- Police: Cumbria
- Fire: Cumbria
- Ambulance: North West
- UK Parliament: Penrith and Solway

Isel is a dispersed settlement and area in the valley of the River Derwent within the Lake District National Park in Cumbria, England. It is an ecclesiastical parish within the civil parish of Blindcrake. Nearby are the hamlets of Setmurthy, Sunderland and Redmain, and the village of Blindcrake.

Isel is a rural community, with a church, a manorial Hall and several farms ranging from dairy to poultry, but lacking basic local facilities having no shop, public house or post office. It is mentioned in the English folk song "Horn of the Hunter."

Isel Parish Church is dedicated to St Michael and the fabric is chiefly Norman. The church contains two pre-Norman carved stones, one of which is a fragment of a cross. Other buildings of interest are Isel Hall (with a pele tower), the ancient bridge of three arches (rebuilt in 1812) and the old vicarage.

== Governance ==
Isel, is part of the Penrith and Solway constituency of the UK parliament.

For Local Government purposes it is administered as part of the Cumberland unitary authority.

Isel has its own Parish Council; Blindcrake Parish Council.

== See also ==
- Listed buildings in Blindcrake
