= Lawson baronets =

There have been six baronetcies created for persons with the surname of Lawson, two in the Baronetage of England and four in the Baronetage of the United Kingdom. Two creations are extant as of 2026.

- Lawson baronets of Brough Hall (first creation, 1665)
- Lawson baronets of Isell (1688)
- Lawson baronets of Brayton (1831)
- Lawson baronets, later Howard-Lawson of Brough Hall (second creation, 1841)
- Lawson baronets of Weetwood Grange (1900)
- Lawson baronets of Knavesmire Lodge (1905)
