= Sir Wilfrid Lawson, 2nd Baronet, of Brayton =

British politician

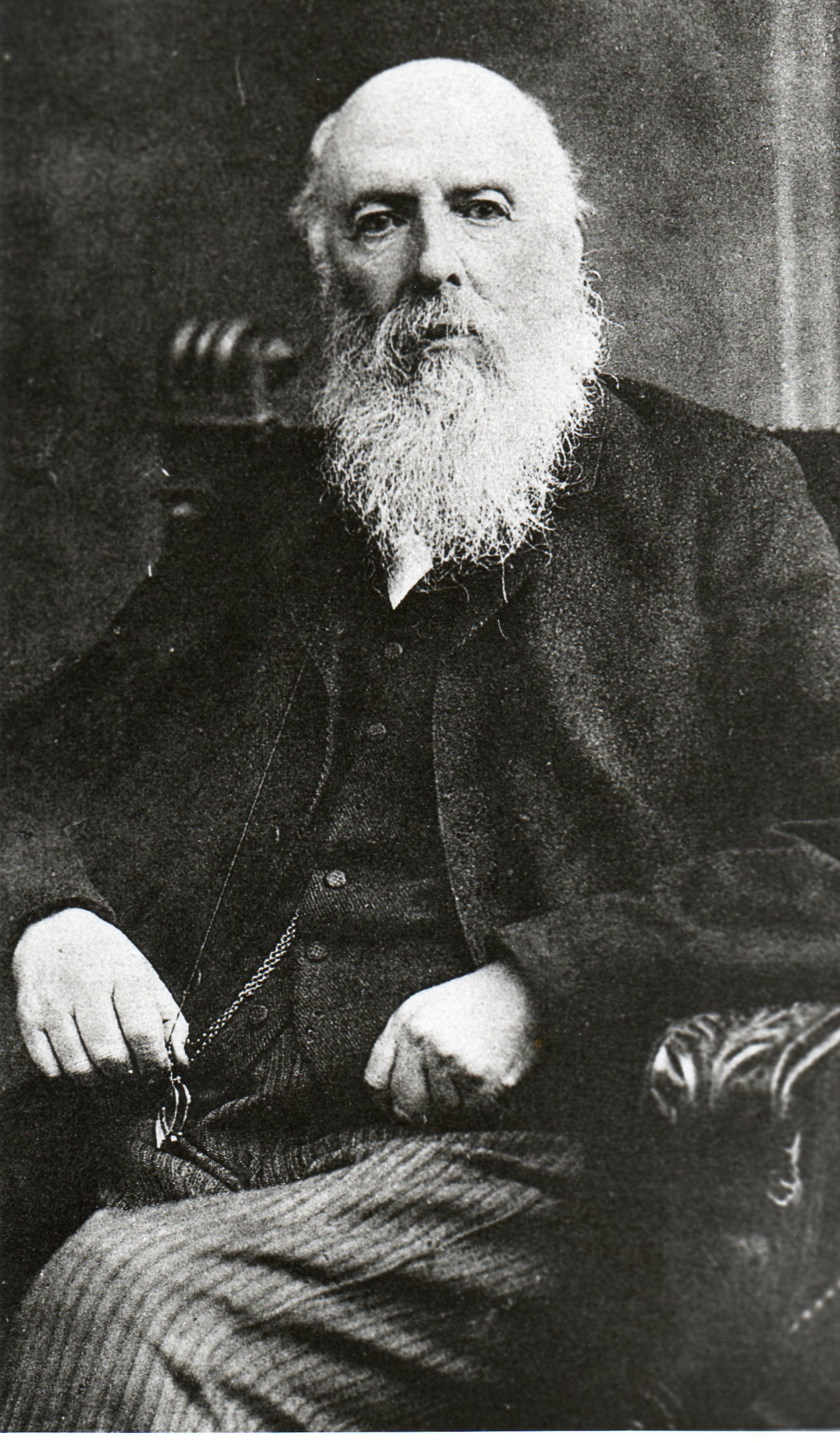
Sir Wilfrid Lawson

Sir Wilfrid Lawson, 2nd Baronet (4 September 1829 – 1 July 1906) was an English temperance campaigner and radical, anti-imperialist Liberal Party politician who sat in the House of Commons variously between 1859 and 1906. He was recognised as the leading humourist in the House of Commons.

Lawson was Member for Carlisle, 1859–65, 1868–85; Cockermouth, 1886–1900; Camborne, 1903–1906; and Cockermouth 1906. He was the son of Sir Wilfrid Lawson, 1st Baronet, of Brayton, who changed his name from Wybergh, and Caroline Graham, daughter of Sir James Graham. He was privately educated at home. He was a founder member of both the National Liberal Club and the Reform League, a prominent member of the Peace Society, and the Society for the Suppression of the Opium Trade. He was a director of the Maryport and Carlisle Railway and a Justice of the Peace for Cumberland. He was always an enthusiast in the cause of temperance and in 1879 he became president of the United Kingdom Alliance. He was, like his younger brother William, a forward-thinking co-operator and agriculturalist.

== Early days ==
Wilfrid Lawson the son of Sir Wilfrid Lawson, 1st Baronet, of Brayton, was born at Brayton Hall, Aspatria, Cumberland on 4 September 1829. Since the family preferred a simple sporting life, they encouraged their children to enjoy a string of outdoor pursuits, including fishing, shooting, ice skating, cricket and the family obsession, foxhunting. He bought John Peel's pack of hounds after Peel's death and became Master of the Cumberland Foxhounds. From early childhood, he developed an exceptional talent for mimicry and a talent for writing rapid, fluent, and vigorous verse that played so conspicuous a part in the serious correspondence of his mature life.

He received his education at home under the tutorship of John Oswald Jackson, a Congregational minister of some repute. In later life, both Lawson and his celebrated brother William openly declared their lack of formal education. Jackson predominantly taught his pupils Greek and Latin prose, complemented with mathematics, natural sciences, political economy, English and foreign history, with the elements of rhetoric and logic to enhance the curriculum. Lawson also gained a fondness for poetry, in particular the works of Lord Byron, whose lines often adorned his political speeches.

=== Family ===
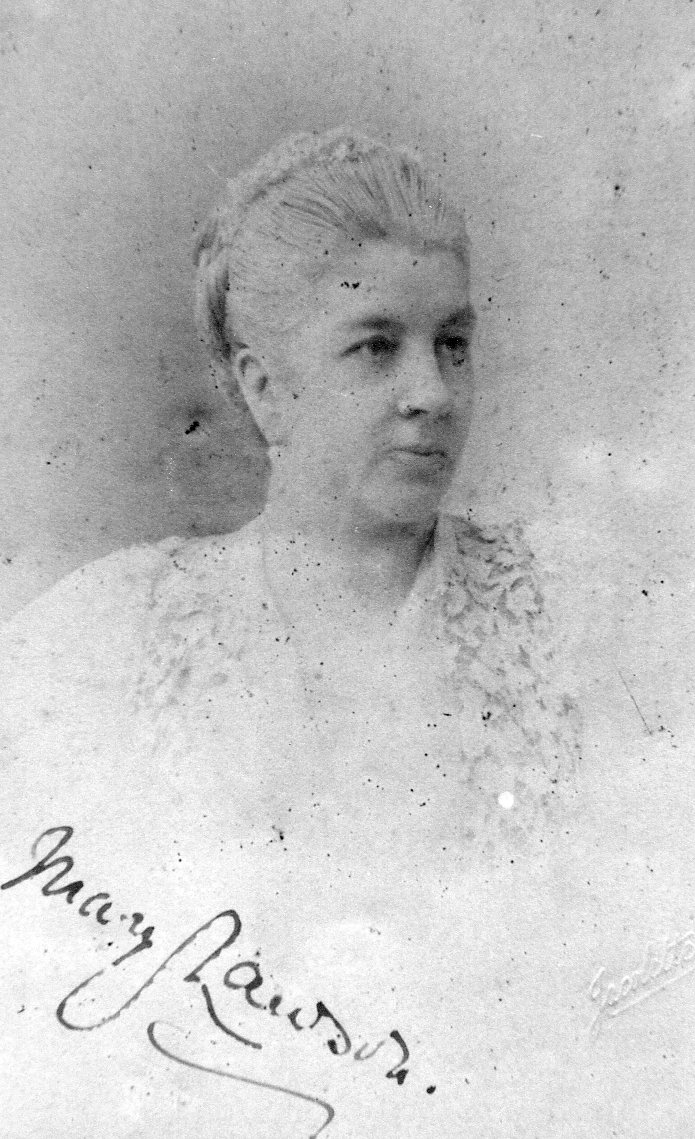
Mary Lawson circa 1900

On 13 November 1860, Lawson married Mary, daughter of Joseph Pocklington Senhouse of Netherhall, Maryport, Cumberland. Their union produced eight children; four boys, Wilfrid, Mordaunt, Arthur and Godfrey; and four girls. Ellen, Mabel, Lucy and Josephine. Ellen married Arthur Henry Holland-Hibbert, 3rd Viscount Knutsford (1855–1935), they produced one daughter named Elsie and one son named Thurstan. In 1895, Mabel married Alan de Lancey Curwen of Workington Hall, and they had three children. In 1896, Lucy married Edward Heathcote Thruston of Pennal Tower, Mochgullith, North Wales

In 1909, Josephine married Frederick William Chance, the member of Parliament for the city of Carlisle. Mary's sister, Blanche, married Alfred Curzon, 4th Baron Scarsdale (1831–1916). Blanche was the mother of Lord Curzon, Viceroy of India. Lawson succeeded to the baronetcy and estates upon the death of his father in 1867.

=== Early political influences ===
With limited access to his intellectual peers, Lawson received his political convictions from his father and a constant stream of influential household guests. In 1840, the family explored the consequences of adopting free trade and the repeal of the iniquitous Corn Laws. They eagerly digested the speeches of Granby, Disraeli, and the Duke of Richmond on one side and of Cobden, Bright and Villiers on the other, with the caricatured comments of Mr. Punch, to enrich the subject.

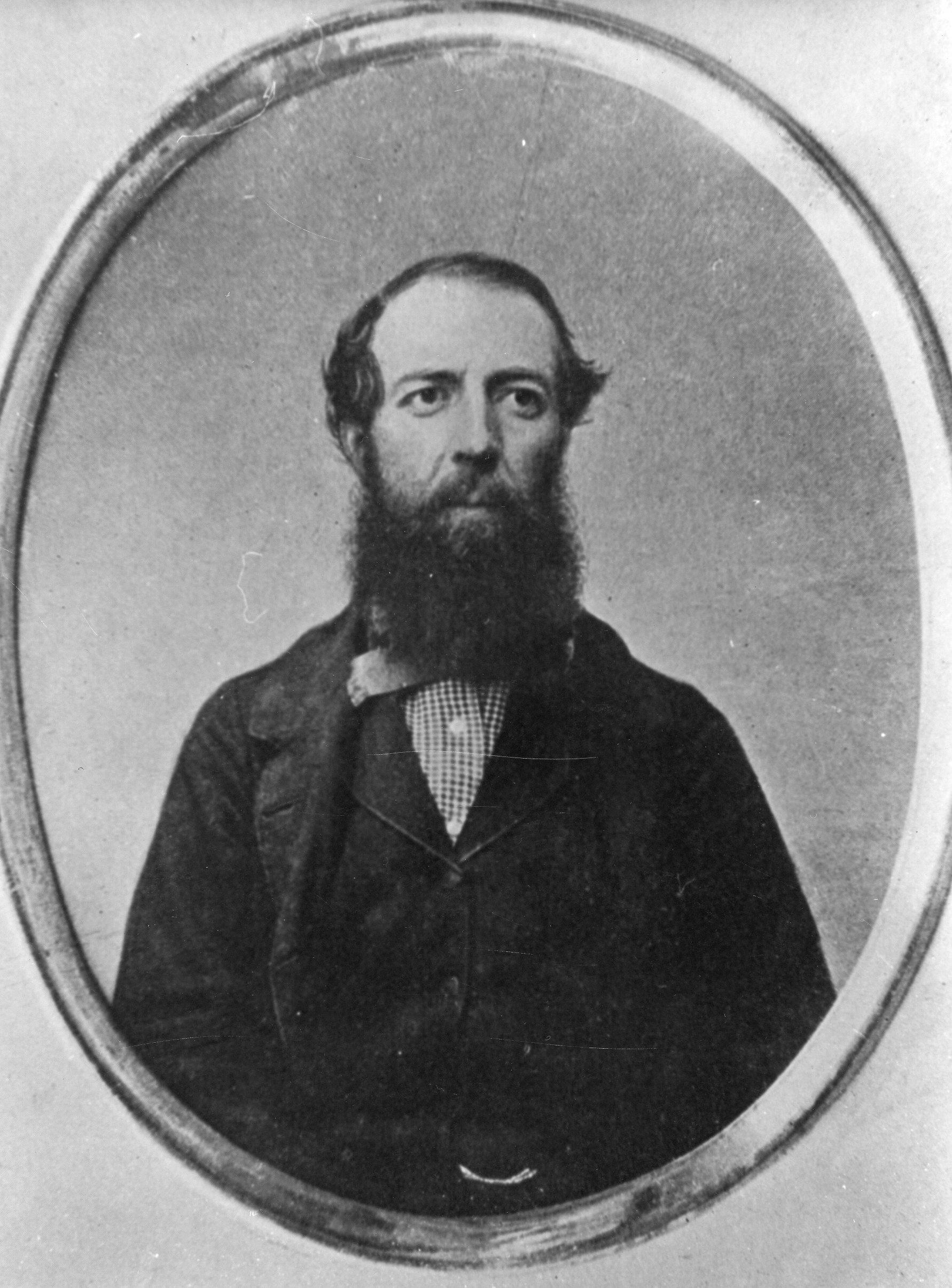
Wilfrid Lawson circa 1860

The Lawsons shared the opinions of radicals, who argued that aristocrats were parasites of the state raising the price of the people's bread as a means of helping the landed interests and to add revenue to the state coffers which could be used for the anti-Christian purposes of corruption and foreign war. In 1843, after attending a series of travelling lectures given by Chalmers and Candlish, they re-enacted the prominent debates relating to the question of Church and State and discussed the Scottish church and its recent schism, when 451 ministers seceded, leaving the Kirk to form the Free Church of Scotland. In 1843, they debated the Rebecca Riots; and after Daniel O'Connell electrified Ireland with his desire to repeal the union they consumed endless hours debating the everlasting Irish Question. In 1848, they contemplated the events surrounding the revolution, when the morning newspapers reported some fresh upheaval, spreading relentlessly across Europe, shaking kingdoms and thrones, causing terrific slaughter in France, provoking Chartist riots in England, and bringing home lessons of deep political importance. Throughout the 1840s, they debated the morality of war, with particular reference to the Afghan and the Chinese Opium Wars. As the wars concluded the question of peace came to the fore. The leaflets of Elihu Burritt' a leading peace campaigner were awaited and absorbed on publication, while another apostle of peace, Henry Richard made a lecturing visit to Brayton. Lawson completed his education by reading The Nonconformist, edited by Edward Miall. Many of these early Whig refrains forged his character and formed his opinions and convictions pushing him along a path that led from romanticism and Evangelicalism to Cobdenism.

=== Political style ===
In his lifetime Lawson was one of Britain's most celebrated and popular political figures and yet he was not a pamphleteer or an essayist, nor was he the owner of a newspaper or a periodical like his radical colleagues, Joseph Cowen and Henry Labouchere. His strength of argument came from his unique way of transmitting the spoken word, which seldom lacked qualities of humour or entertainment such that his precise, logical, well-balanced arguments ranked high, when compared to contemporary political orators. Lawson became the chief jester to the House of Commons, where he contributed a rich, racy style to debates, earning him the epithet the "witty baronet".

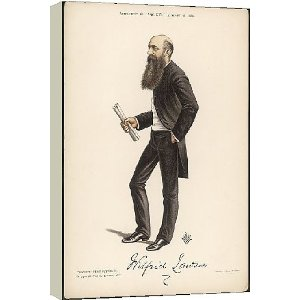
One of the many caricature depictions

Lawson was a member of innumerable societies and pressure groups, and made many political speeches throughout his life on a wide variety of subjects and related incidents. Today he is widely remembered for his pursuit of the lost cause of temperance reform, when temperance was only one strand of a very complex set of ideas he espoused. Lawson was in fact, the most Cobdenite of the Cobdenites and his contribution to the debate on radical reform, and foreign and colonial policy was significant. In the context of his radical philosophy as a whole, Lawson was a full-blooded radical, whose views covered a wide range and were almost always, very extreme. If the voting habits of an individual Member of Parliament can be used to place that person along the radical spectrum then Lawson belongs on the outer fringes, for it is doubtful if any member of any British political party or of any time in the history of the modern British parliamentary system, has ever voted in as many minority divisions as Lawson.

== Political career ==
=== Entry into politics ===
After Lord Palmerston dissolved Parliament in 1857, Lawson came forward as a radical to contest the West Cumberland stronghold owned by the Lowther family. The Lawsons were obsessed with the concept of political freedom and since the constituency had for over twenty years been denied the opportunity to select their representative Lawson senior was determined, at personal expense to offer the electorate a choice. Lawson stood as a Little Englander, with a radical programme endorsing the Liberal watchwords, Peace, Retrenchment and Reform. Lawson identified with the Manchester School of politics and consistently advocated their principles, particularly in response to conflict undertaken to promote selfish British interests. Although Lawson, a disappointing third in the poll, lost the election, the Manchester School in the form of Bright, Cobden, Miall, Milner Gibson and Layard all lost their seats.

=== 1859 Carlisle election ===
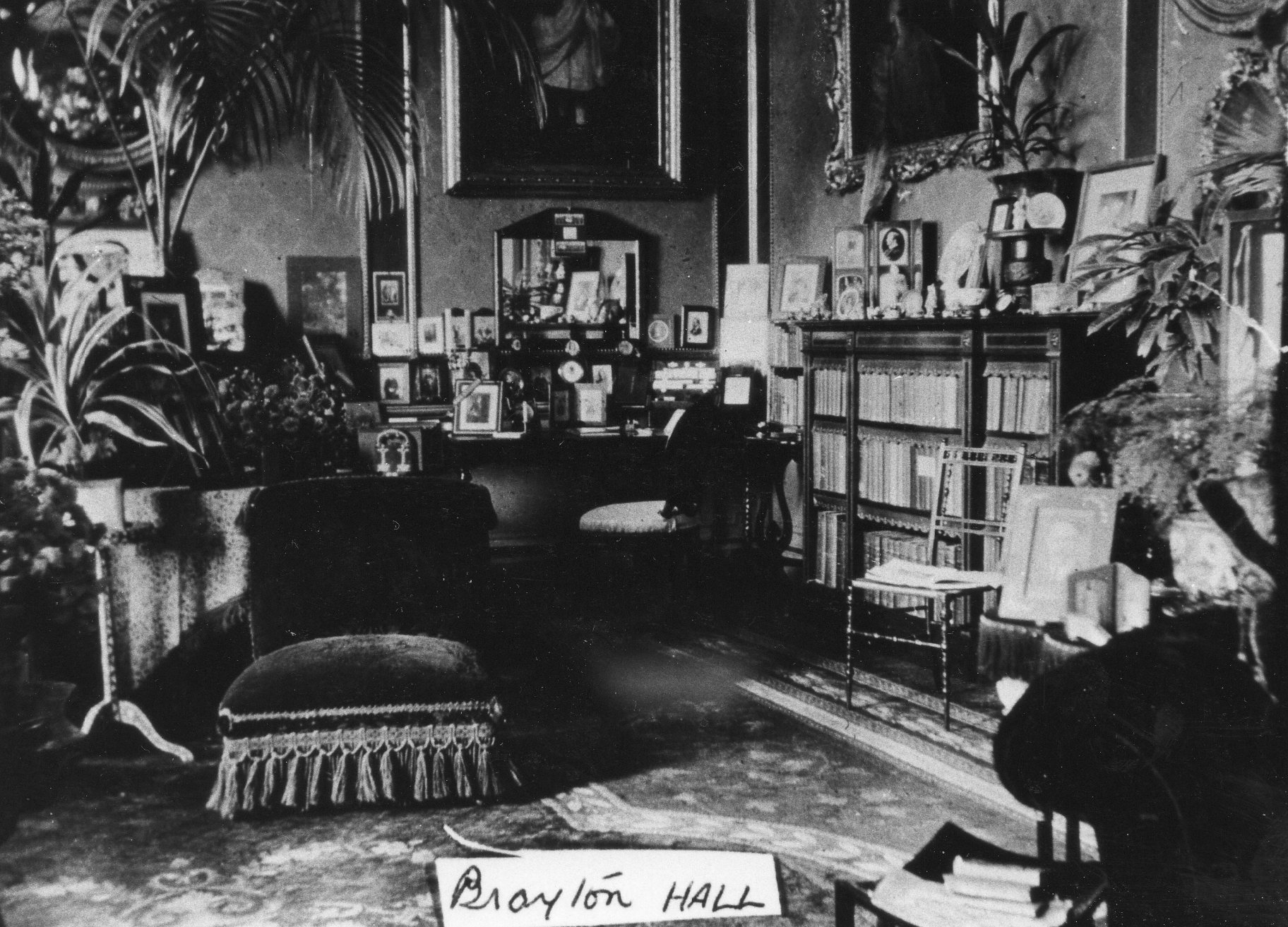
One of the reception rooms at Brayton Hall circa1890

After Lord Derby dissolved Parliament in 1859, Lawson was invited to stand with his uncle, Sir James Graham for the Carlisle constituency. Although Graham's address was moderate, he informed his agent, "Lawson and his father sincerely entertain extreme opinions, and may be considered partisans of Mr Bright. Lawson would go the whole length, would pledge himself to the ballot, and would go ahead of me." Lawson concurred; "I may honestly confess I am rather more of a radical than he (Graham)." When questioned on the lengths he would go in lowering the franchise, he replied, "As far as any proposition is likely to be brought into Parliament, which has the least chance of success." When the poll closed Graham stood at its head with 538 votes, Lawson trailed by 22 votes, 40 votes ahead of his Tory rival. As a result, he became a Member of Parliament. Lawson made his maiden speech on 20 March 1860, in a debate relating to the introduction of the Secret Ballot.

=== 1865 Carlisle election ===
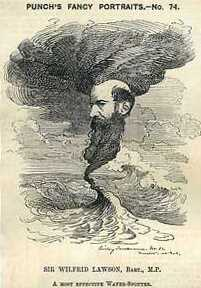
Punch: A Most Effective Water Spouter

Under normal circumstances Lawson should have returned to the House of Commons in 1865; however, during the previous year he had introduced the Permissive Bill. A Bill so unpopular, he struggled to find a member to second the proposal. Needless to say Lawson lost the division by 294 votes to 37. For suggesting that people had the right to restrict the access of others to the liquor shops, the full weight of public opinion favouring the liberty of the subject, backed by the Tories and brewing industry, rained down upon him. Although Lawson was popular for other reasons, and lost the election by a mere seventeen votes, it prompted The Times newspaper to run an article suggesting that no future sensible constituency would ever return him to the house. However, an opportunity arose for an early return to parliament in July 1866, after Lord Naas, the Conservative member for the small ancient borough of Cockermouth became Chief Secretary of Ireland. When the redistribution of parliamentary seats became an electoral issue Lawson informed his would-be supporters that if elected he would not hesitate to do everything in his power, to support some form of borough disenfranchisement. However, when his defeat became a forlorn conclusion he retired from the contest.

=== 1868 Carlisle election ===
By openly supporting Gladstone's desire to disestablish the Irish Church Lawson endured the wrath of the Church of England in the form of the Dean of Carlisle, who proclaimed Lawson the greatest radical in all of Europe. To those who accused Lawson of "robbing a poor man of his beer". He retorted, "Far from the truth I am trying to rob the rich man of his prey, out of the plunder he makes, from the homes and happiness of the working men of this country." He also supported the need for a national education policy based upon a secular system with the capacity to accommodate the various religious interests. Nationally the general election produced a landslide Liberal victory with a majority of over one hundred. Lawson returned to parliament at the head of the Carlisle poll.

=== 1874 Carlisle election ===
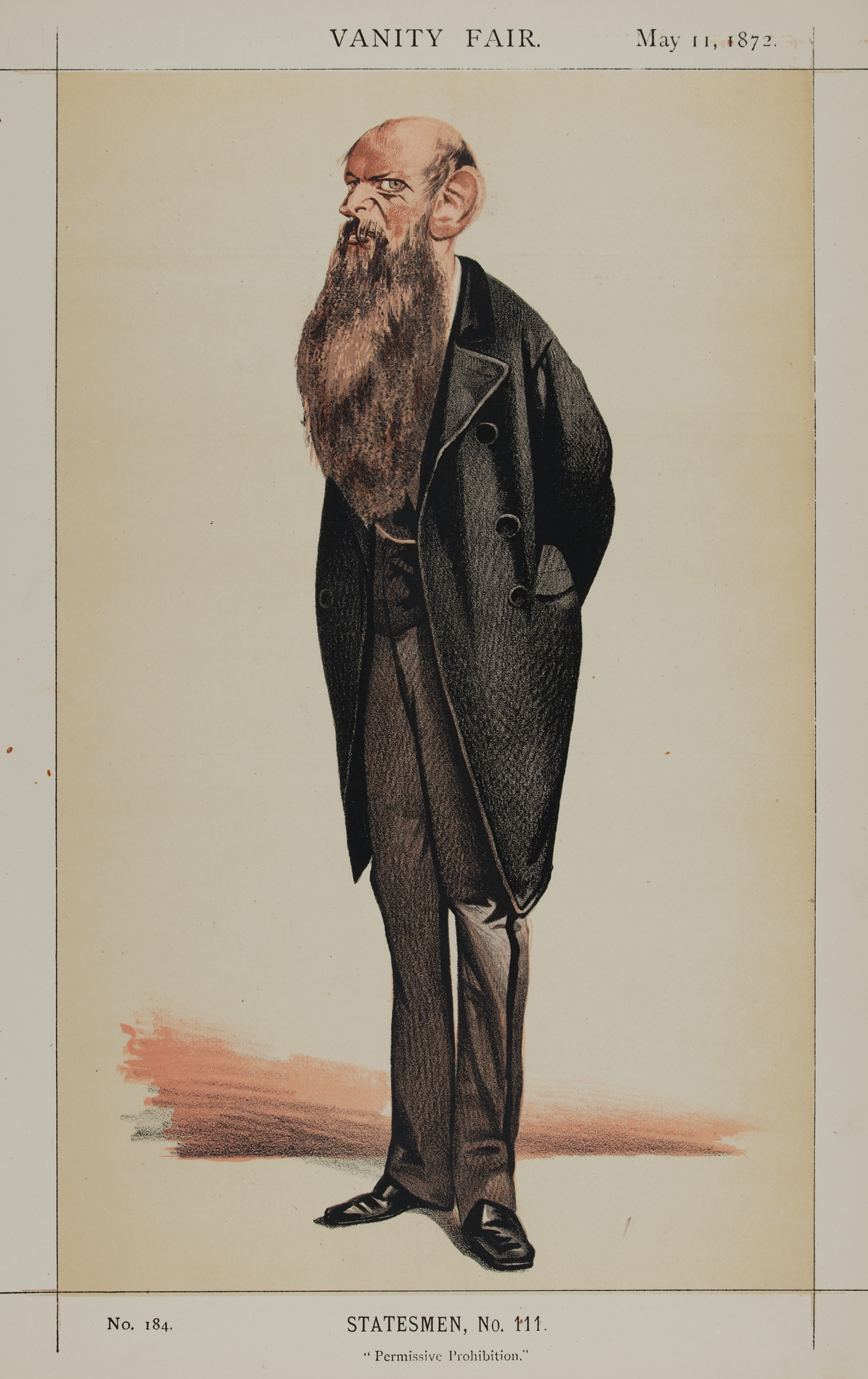
Caricature by Adriano Cecioni published in Vanity Fair in 1872.

As the 1874 general election approached, Lawson had good cause to feel satisfied with the progressive reforms introduced by the outgoing Gladstone government. They had gone some way to pacify Ireland by disestablishing the Irish church and introducing the Landlord and Tenant (Ireland) Act 1870. They had introduced an Education Bill, which Lawson welcomed with a few reservations. They had introduced the Local Government Board Act 1871, which put the supervision of the Poor Law under the Local Government Board. They had repealed the Ecclesiastical Titles Act and abolished the Religious tests in the universities. They had introduced much-needed army reforms, instituted the abolition of the sale of commissions in the army and made peacetime flogging illegal. In foreign affairs they had settled the Alabama Claims by international arbitration to the benefit of the United States; and kept Britain out of the Franco-Prussian War. They had introduced the Secret Ballot notwithstanding the serious opposition from the Tory party. Although parliament had passed the 1872 licensing act, Lawson had failed miserably to enact his Permissive Prohibitory Bill. In 1870, he had without success, introduced a resolution condemning the Opium traffic, which he compared to the problems associated with alcohol: "We go on to this day merrily poisoning the Chinese with opium as we do our own people with alcohol." Lawson also voted in a minority division of two in support of Sir Charles Dilke when heavily censured by parliament after seeking returns relating to the expenditure on the British Royal family. On 2 August 1870, at the time of the Franco-Prussian War, Lawson had opposed Gladstone, who sought parliament's permission to increase the army estimates by £2,000,000 and 20,000 men. Lawson saw the vote as a danger to Britain and represented the first step in a direction away from a policy of non-intervention, war when not a necessity, as he emphasised, a crime and no war was justified unless strictly defensive. Although he threatened to walk through the lobbies unattended he received support from six radicals. During the election, Lawson expressed his opposition to the ongoing Ashanti war which he saw as a continuation of the drive to open out Africa "We are opening out Africa to progress, civilisation and religion. I don't believe in the souls of a few being saved by destroying the bodies of many more out there. I don't believe in civilising and Christianising by the sword." Unlike many of his Liberal colleagues, Lawson was re-elected and would spend the vast majority of his time in the forthcoming parliament opposing Beaconsfieldism and what he saw as unnecessary conflict.

=== Beaconsfieldism ===
Lawson began his campaign against Disraeli's imperialist policies by opposing the annexation of the Fiji Islands. He supported Gladstone in his sustained attack on the British government's policy relating to the Eastern question by proposing, although unsuccessfully, Resolutions against the Vote of Credit for £6,000,000 and 20,000 men, and the calling out of the Reserve. He opposed Britain's invasion of Afghanistan, as he explained, on grounds of principle, honour, morality and justice. Between the years 1877 and 1881, Lawson was extremely busy protesting against the British government's imperial policies in South Africa. It began with a sustained attack against the annexation of the Transvaal, which swiftly lead to the Zulu war and the role played by Sir Bartle Frere, the High Commissioner to the Cape Colony, whom Lawson continuously asked parliament to recall. He led a successful opposition, following the death of Prince Louis Napoleon, thus preventing his burial in Westminster Abbey. He also led a successful opposition to the annexation of Basutoland by the Cape colony, thus maintaining the country's eventual independence from South Africa. Lawson summarised Disraeli's policies with the following statement:

"at the undertakings into which the Government had gone, the things they had done, or tried to do, or promised to do, or failed to do. They had set themselves up to frighten Russia, protect Turkey, to annex the Transvaal, to reform Asia Minor, to occupy Cyprus, to manipulate Egypt, to invade Zululand, to catch Cetywayo, to smoke out Secocoeine, and to secure a scientific frontier for India. How he asked, had they tried to do these things? They had shifted our Indian troops up and down, moved our fleet backwards and forwards, made secret treaties, sent ultimatums to everybody with whom they had the slightest quarrel, engaged in two cruel and unjust wars and paved the way for any number more."

=== Egyptian crisis ===
In 1880, the Carlisle constituency returned Lawson to parliament with an increased majority, while the country as a whole returned a Liberal government led by Gladstone. Lawson supported the claim of the atheist Charles Bradlaugh, who sought religious freedom. In relation to Irish affairs, he supported Gladstone's introduction of the Land Law (Ireland) Act 1881, only to oppose the government after Gladstone introduced the Protection of Person and Property Act 1881, which Lawson described as "starting once more on the hopeless, miserable, never-ending attempt to settle the Irish difficulty by force." In January 1881, Lawson became a leading spokesman for the Transvaal Independence Committee, from where he denounced the belligerence before applauding the negotiated settlement to end the First Boer War. The Egyptian crisis followed. The British occupation of Egypt was the most important single act of British foreign policy during Gladstone's second administration and according to many historians has since become one of the classic case studies of the partition of Africa and of late nineteenth-century informal imperialism in general. Lawson's agitation against intervention in Egypt was completely in harmony with his support for the Transvaal Boers in their struggle against British rule; his support for Afghan tribesmen seeking to retain their independence; and his wish to see justice spread to encompass the needs of the Irish people. Underlying all of these policies was an inherent distrust of the concept of empire and a cardinal belief in the traditional assertions of Cobden, that Britain should promote peace, and avoid interference in the political institutions of other nations. In many respects, Egypt was Lawson's defining moment as an anti-imperialist radical. He not only led the agitation but he disagreed with the opinions of many of his radical contemporaries, and colleagues he had and would later stand shoulder to shoulder with in agitating against similar imperialist concerns. For three long years he criticised British diplomats and argued against a government of his own making; against the European bondholders' control of the country; against the bombardment of Alexandria; and against the British armies destruction of the Egyptian force under Ahmed Orabi at the Battle of Tel el-Kebir. He argued against parliament awarding a Vote of Thanks for Britain's military leaders; and in conjunction with Wilfrid Scawen Blunt campaigned for the release of Ahmed Orabi. On one occasion, in a blistering attack on the Government's forward policy, Lawson reminded his colleagues of their probable response had the bombardment occurred under a Conservative and not a Liberal administration.

They would have had his right hon. friend the Secretary of State for the Home Department (Sir William Harcourt), (laughter and cheers) stumping the country and denouncing Government by ultimatum. They would have had the noble Marquesss, the Secretary of State for India (Lord Hartington) moving a Resolution condemning the proceeding's taken behind the back of Parliament. (Cheers from the Irish Members.) They would have had the President of the Board of Trade (Joseph Chamberlain) summoning the caucus. (Cheers and laughter.) They would have had the other right hon. Gentleman, the Member for Birmingham, the Chancellor of the Duchy of Lancaster (John Bright) declaiming in the Town Hall of Birmingham against the wicked Tory Government; and as for the Prime Minister, they all knew there would not have been a railway train, (cheers and laughter) passing a roadside station, that he would not have pulled up to proclaim the doctrine of non-intervention as the duty of the Government. (Laughter and cheers from the Irish Members). It was perfectly abominable to see men whom they respected, whom they believed in, whom they had placed in power, overturning every principle they had professed, carrying out a policy that was abhorrent to every lover of justice and of right.

As quickly as Gladstone began to solve one problem another arrived in the Sudan. In 1881, an obscure tribesman and religious zealot named Muhammad Ahmad, proclaimed himself the Mahdi, who initiated a Jihad against the Egyptian military occupation. After 50,000 Mahdist tribesmen annihilated a 10,000-strong Egyptian army under the command of a reluctant British mercenary, general William Hicks Pasha, the Cabinet fully understood the serious nature of their involvement in Egypt. This resulted in the dispatch of General Charles George Gordon to oversee the evacuation of Khartoum. After supporting a policy of "rescue and retire" Lawson quickly withdrew his support; he could find no relationship between what was described by Gladstone as "a small service to humanity," and the killing of thousands of Arabs. After the death of Gordon, Lawson applauded Gladstone's decision to evacuate Sudan.

=== West Cumberland ===
In 1885, after the reduction of the Carlisle seat to one member Lawson decided to contest the Lowther dominated Cockermouth constituency. However, his attitude towards Gladstone's imperialist policies in Egypt had made enemies in his Cockermouth constituency and on 5 December, the newly enfranchised electorate rejected his appeal by a small but decisive margin of ten votes. As a result, Lawson missed the parliamentary debates surrounding Irish home Rule and the subsequent schism of the Liberal party. Lawson was extremely critical of the newly formed Liberal Unionists, particularly in the roles played by Joseph Chamberlain and John Bright. In Lawson's opinion, the turncoats had become the reactionary radical opposition and had placed Britain under the yoke of a Tory administration. He cared little for their names: Liberal Unionists, Dissenting Liberals, Hartingtonians, Chamberlainites, Old Whigs, Randolphians, Tory democrats, Conservatives, Constitutionalists, Ruling Councillors, Knight Harbingers, Union Jacks and Union Jackasses; they were all out and out Tories. Lawson returned to the House of Commons in the election of 1886, one of only three "Home Rulers" to capture a Conservative seat; converting a minority of ten into a majority of over one thousand. In parliament he vehemently opposed Arthur Balfour's coercion measures. He served as President of the second day of the 1887 Co-operative Congress.

=== The Newcastle programme and the second home rule bill ===
Sir Wilfrid Lawson c1895

In October 1891, the Liberal Party held their annual conference in the city of Newcastle, where delegates thrashed out a radical agenda to take them through the next general election, and beyond to the new century. Immediately but reluctantly endorsed by Gladstone, the Newcastle Programme as it became popularly known was a grandiose scheme that enshrined the majority of Lawson's outstanding reforms. Lawson had waited a lifetime for the realisation of these enactments, and boasted: "If the chartists could rise from their graves they would not believe that the Liberal party had absolutely homologated those great reforms." The election issue was no longer simply Home Rule; it was the full Newcastle programme, and Lawson was anxious to settle the Irish question to secure further domestic reforms. Back in parliament Lawson continued to support Gladstone, who introduced his Second Home Rule bill, which, except for a reduced number of Irish members at Westminster mirrored its predecessor. As expected the bill's progress through Parliament was obstructed by the Opposition who emphasised all the inadequacies in the measure, which in turn justified the House of Lords rejecting the bill. In the Commons, the bill passed its third reading on 1 September. However, after four nights of obligatory debate, the Lords rejected the measure by a huge majority of 419 to 41. Lawson was furious, mend them, was not his way, "you only mend a thing you want to keep, and he never wanted to keep the House of Lords, he wanted to end them." After Gladstone's resignation in 1894 Lawson's expectations crumbled.

=== Boer war ===
The Cockermouth electorate returned Lawson to parliament in the general election of 1895, where, with a slightly reduced majority he continued to prosecute his anti-war opinions. In 1898, he criticised the government, the Clergy, the newspaper editors and above all, public opinion after a command under General Kitchener slaughtered thousands of Dervish natives at the battle of Omdurman. In 1896 he denounced the Jameson raid and sought answers to questions relating to the role played by the Colonial Secretary, Joseph Chamberlain. When war came in the form of the Second Boer War, Lawson was unapologetic in his criticism of the British government's policy. He became a prominent Pro-Boer and a member of numerous anti-war organisations including the Stop the War Committee, the League of Liberals Against Aggression and Militarism, and the South Africa Conciliation Committee. On numerous occasions, he voted against, and spoke out against providing finance, sending men, ammunition and supplies, in the vain hope that with sufficient support he could bring down the government and so end the war. However, all his efforts came to nothing and in return he became one of the few pro-Boer politicians to lose his parliamentary seat at the subsequent so-called Khaki election of 1900.

=== Camborne ===
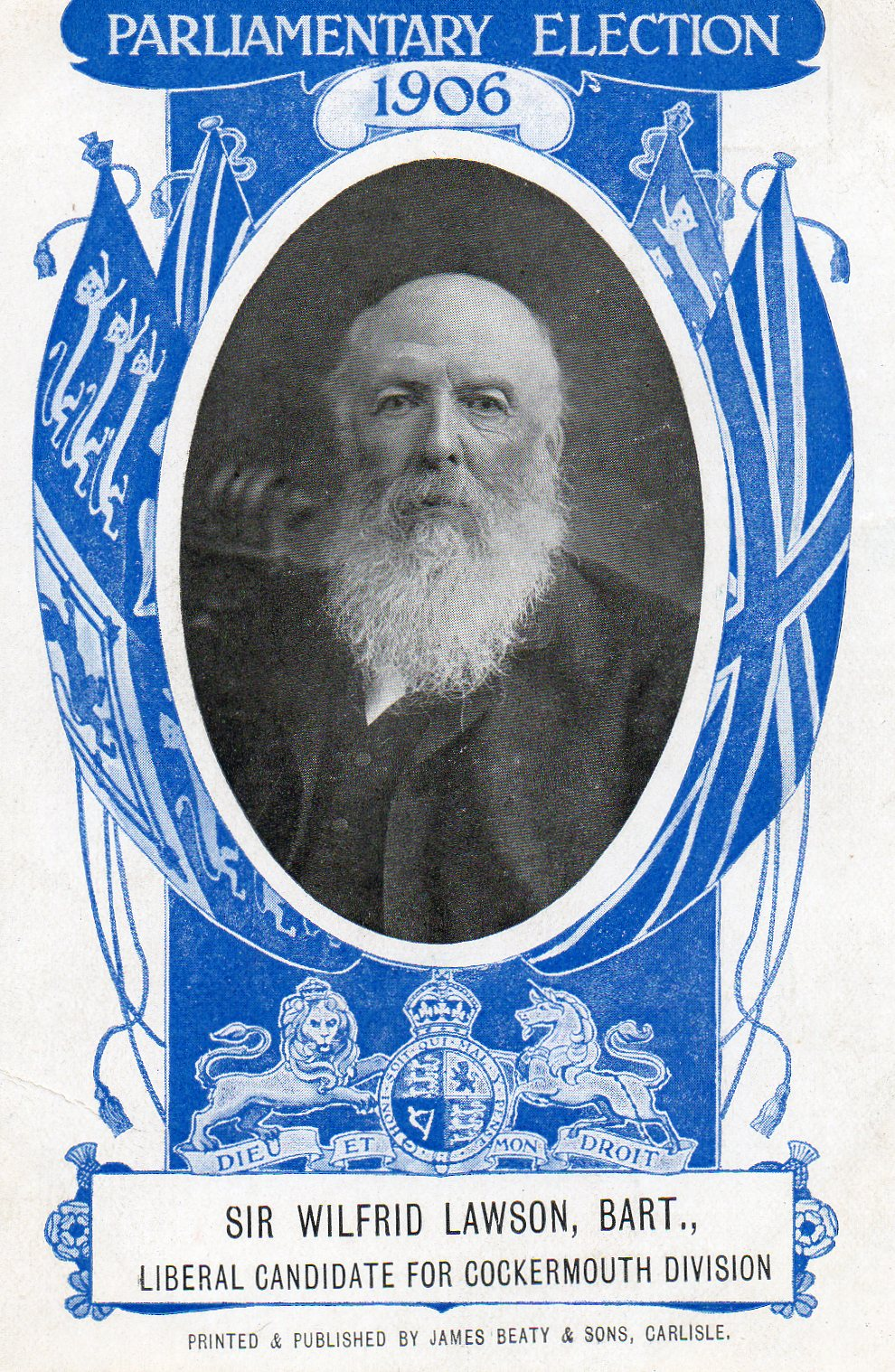
Election Postcard

Following the death of William Sproston Caine M.P. on 17 March 1903, the Liberal Association of the Camborne Division of Cornwall invited Lawson to stand on their behalf at the forthcoming by-election. They made the offer under peculiarly acceptable conditions, for should he secure the seat, he would be at liberty, when the next election occurred, to return, should he wish, to his old constituency at Cockermouth. Almost immediately after the Cornish electorate returned Lawson with a huge majority, the Cockermouth Liberal Associated selected him to stand as their candidate at the next election. In parliament he continued to prosecute his anti-imperialist, Free Trade and temperance views while at home he began to campaign for the oncoming election. In January 1906 he returned with a majority of almost 600.

== Temperance ==
Although Lawson did not enter the House of Commons on behalf of the Temperance movement he became their chief parliamentary spokesman. In 1863 he spoke in favour of a Bill to introduce the Sunday closing of public houses. Later that year he proposed that "the Laws under which Licences are granted for the sale of Intoxicating Liquors are eminently unsatisfactory and deficient in power to protect the public, and therefore require immediate alteration." After the resolution was heavily defeated he was encouraged to introduce his Permissive Bill. On 8 June, Lawson rose in front of a packed House of Commons to deliver a speech of great ability that filled four pages of Hansard, to move the second reading of the first of several Permissive Bills. A policy that later became known as Local Option and eventually Local Veto, The Bill was fashioned to embody the convictions but not the policy of the United Kingdom Alliance. he did not propose to prohibit the sale of liquor by enactment. The Bill provided that on the application of any district, be that parish, town or borough, the votes of the ratepayers should be cast on the question of whether the trade in alcoholic beverages should exist in that district or not; where a majority of two-thirds of the ratepayers would be required to decide the outcome. The Bill was heavily defeated by a majority of 257. He reintroduced the bill again in 1869, 1870, 1871, 1873, 1874, 1876, 1878, In 1879, he varied his attack on the drink trade by proposing a Resolution in place of the Permissive Bill. Taking the words from a recommendation of the Convocation of the province of Canterbury, he asked that inhabitants of districts, being the persons most interested in the licensing of Public Houses, should themselves have the power of stopping such licensing, if they objected to having the trade forced upon them. In the following year he moved his resolution on two occasions, In the first, he was defeated by a majority of 114 votes, whereas on the second occasion he carried his motion by 26 votes. Although he carried the motion again in 1881 and 1883 with majorities of 42 and 87, Gladstone's government failed to enact the policy.

== Death ==
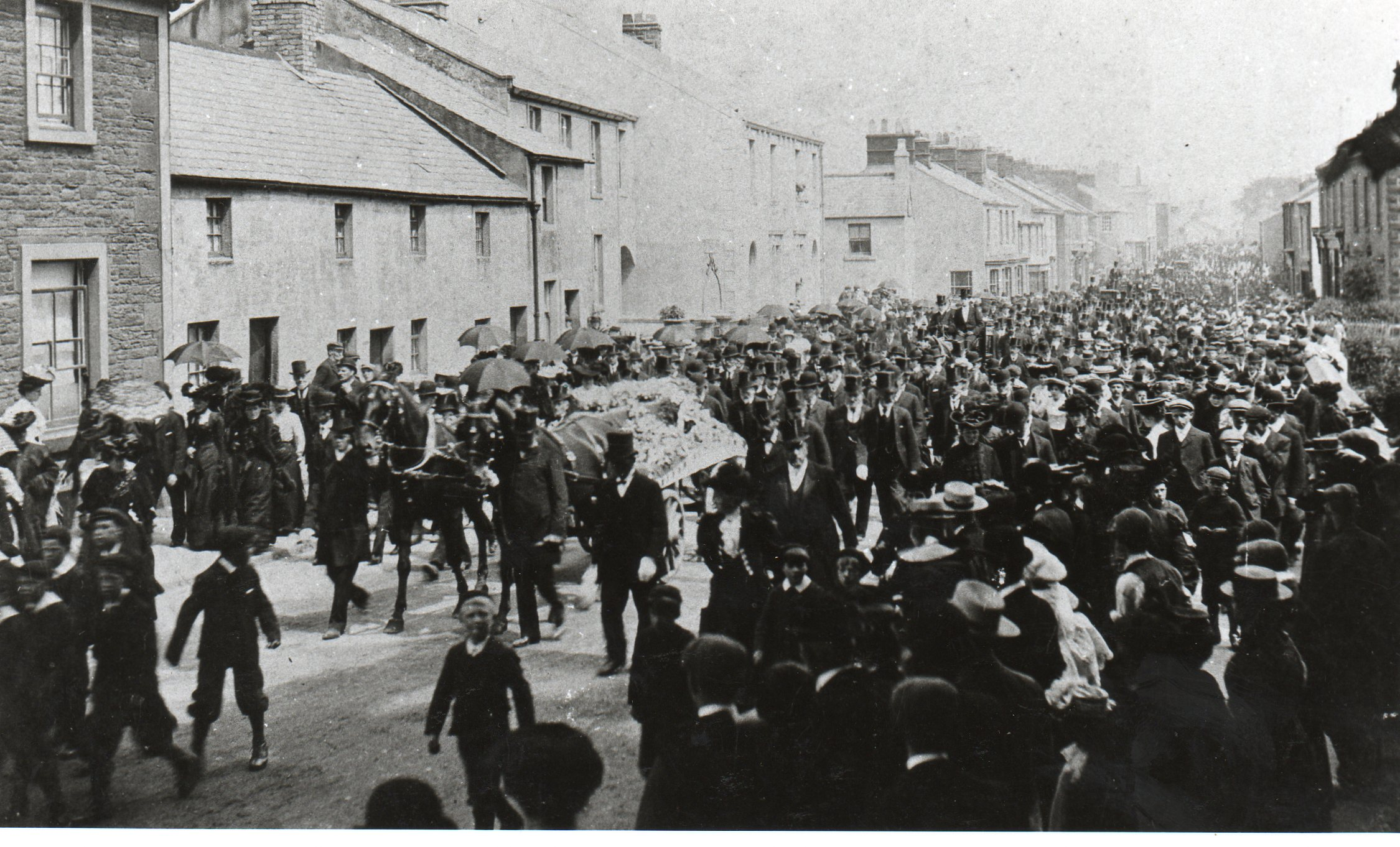
The Start of the Funeral Cortege

On 30 June, though feeling tired and weary, Lawson went down to the House to record his vote. From where he returned to No 18, Ovington Square, Knightsbridge, London, went to bed and never rose again. The first part of the funeral arrangements took place at St Margaret's Church, Westminster amidst a large gathering of members of Parliament, family members, personal friends, and representatives of public bodies.

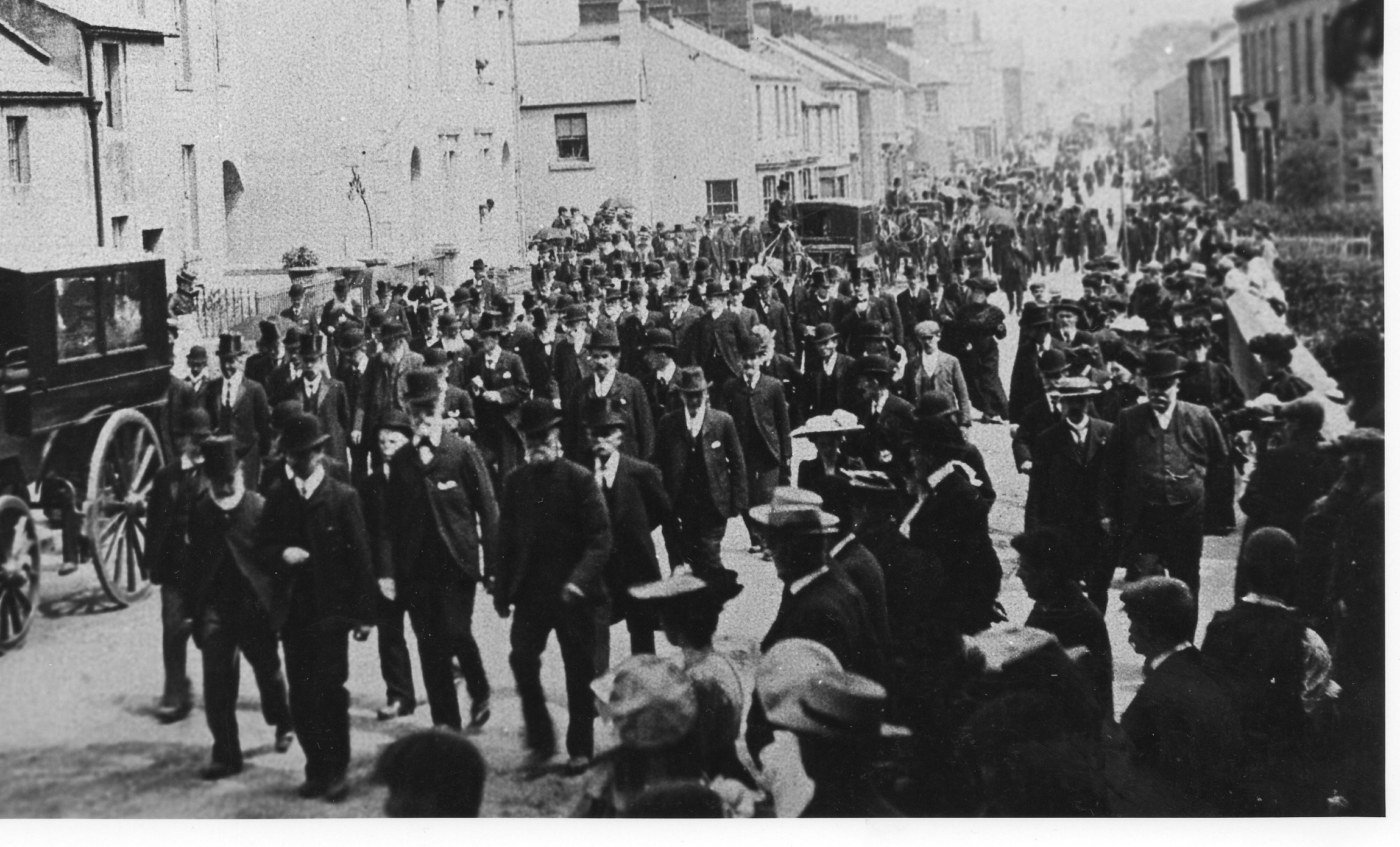
The End of the Funeral Cortege

The interment of the remains took place at Aspatria churchyard on the following day. The large concourse of people who followed the coffin from Brayton Hall to the churchyard was representative of the political and public life of the county, whilst the temperance organisations represented were of a national character. The inscription on the coffin read:- Wilfrid Lawson, 2nd Baronet, Born 4 September 1829, Died 1 July 1906.

At the time of his death, Lawson was chiefly known as a pro-Boer, and anti-everything else; a little Englander, a Peace-at-any-price Man, a would-be destroyer of the established church, the House of Lords, the liquor traffic, and several other institutions less robust. He supported payment for Members of parliament, women's suffrage, the construction of a Channel tunnel, the Irish Home Rule movement, opposed coercion in all its manifestations and stoically defended Free Trade whenever a threat appeared. After a long career his successes were few, although in 1892, after an eighteen-year struggle, he did eventually get a majority against the motion for adjourning on the Derby day. Today he is primarily remembered as a Temperance Reformer. Although offered a Privy Councillorship by Henry Campbell-Bannerman he declined.

== Memorials ==
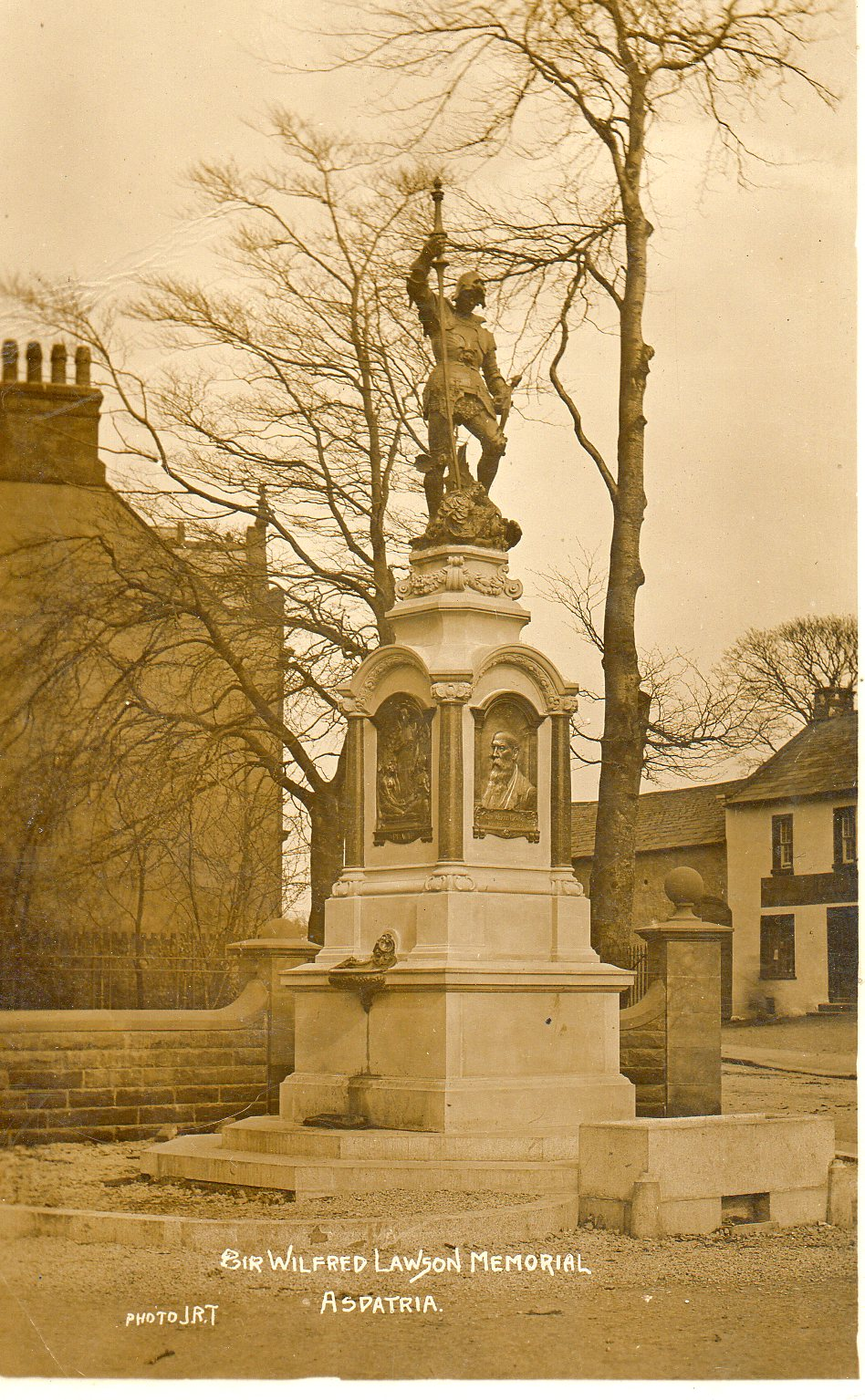
The Sir Wilfrid Lawson Memorial, Aspatria

On 21 April 1908, the Earl of Carlisle, unveiled a memorial, designed by Louis Frederick Roslyn, in the form of a drinking fountain surmounted by a bronze group of St. George and the dragon. The monument, financed by public subscription, stands in the town of Aspatria. On the front of the fountain is a portrait of Lawson, inscribed with dates of birth and death. On the right-hand side is a bronze panel representing Temperance, in which is portrayed a young girl offering a traveller a drink of water, drawn from an adjoining well. On the left-hand side a third panel depicts Peace, on which appears a tribesman dressed in savage garb, clasping the hand of friendship held out by a warrior kneeling at the feet of a winged Angel, which crowned by a halo is rising in the background. The fourth panel bears the following inscription:

Remember
Wilfrid Lawson
2nd Baronet of Brayton & Isel
In whose honour this fountain is erected by his many friends and admirers. Beloved for the integrity of his life and the height of his ideals. An example for all time for one who gave himself for others, believing in the brotherhood of man. A lover of truth and mercy, a brave and strenuous advocate of temperance, which sacred cause he championed in the House of Commons for forty years with gay wisdom and perseverance.

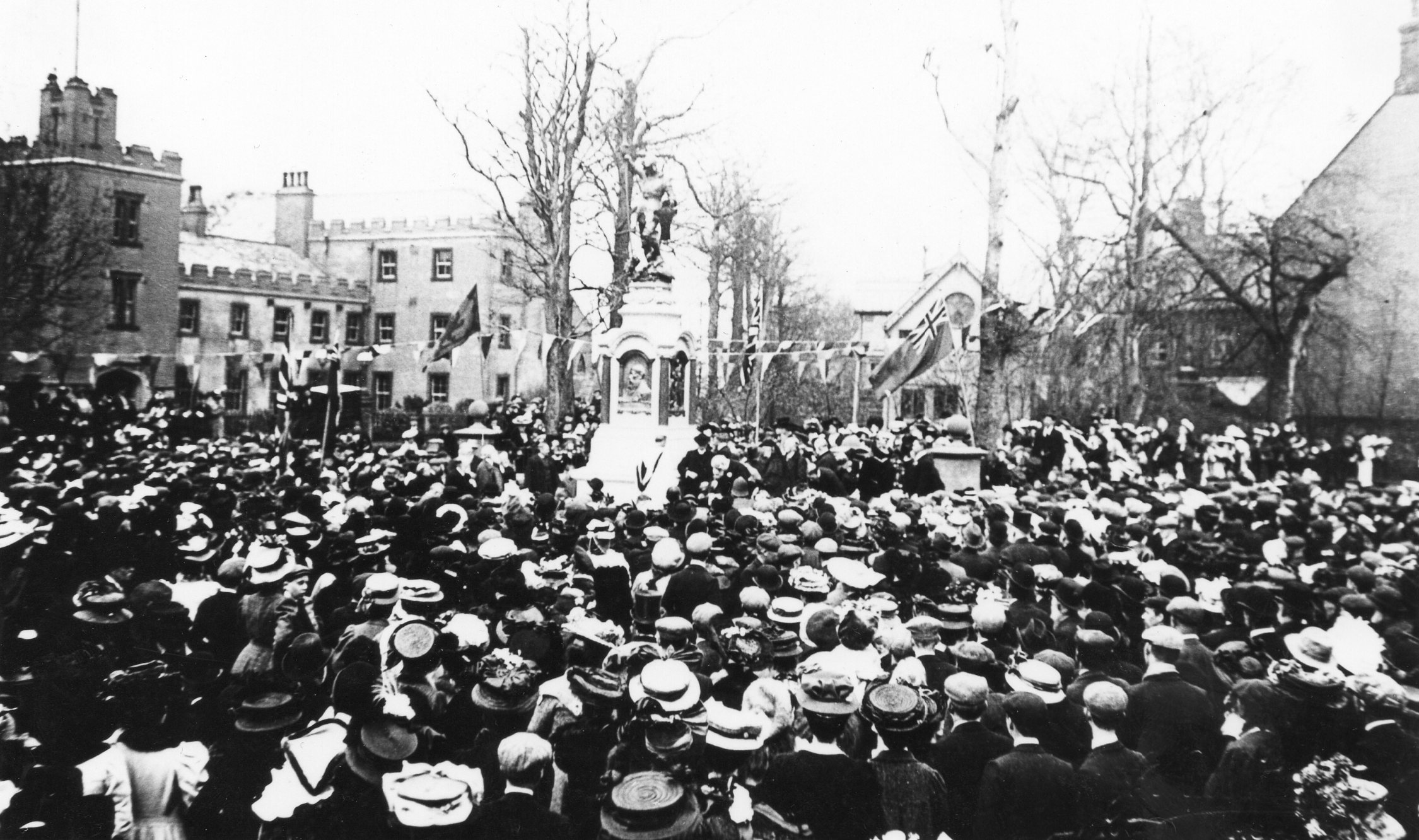
Unveiling of Sir Welfrid Lawson Memorial at Aspatria 21 April 1908

On 6 June 1908, the Lawson family installed a stained glass window dedicated to the memory of their late patriarch, in the east end of Aspatria Church. The window is large and beautifully ornate, and symbolises the characters and scene of the last chapter of Revelations.

On 20 July 1909, the members of the United Kingdom Alliance and other Temperance organisations erected a second memorial in the Victoria Embankment Gardens in London, close to Cleopatra's Needle. It was unveiled, amidst continuous interruptions by suffragettes, by the then prime minister, H. H. Asquith, who said:

"Sir Wilfrid Lawson was one of the most remarkable and certainly one of the most attractive political characters of the times. He was an apostle not of lost but of gaining causes, content for most of his life to be in the minority, but watching year by year the minority slowly developing into the majority of the future. I doubt very much whether we shall ever see again in our time a combination in one and the same man of such fearlessness and courage, such a passionate love for freedom, such a single minded independence and self devotion, such an enduring and strenuous assiduity in pursuit of the cause once taken up, and never by him to be laid down; such a combination.".

The bronze statue, designed by David McGill, is striking, life-like and shows Lawson, in an attitude of debate. On the front of the pedestal on which it stands is the inscription: – "Sir Wilfrid Lawson, Bart., of Brayton, Cumberland; born September 4th, 1829: Member of Parliament for Carlisle, Cockermouth, Camborne, 1859 1906; president of the United Kingdom Temperance Alliance, 1879 1909." On one side of the pedestal are the words. "A true patriot, a wise and witty orator, a valiant and farseeing reformer, he spent a long life as the courageous champion of righteousness, peace, freedom and temperance." On the other side, the inscription runs. "Erected by his friends and followers in grateful remembrance of his splendid leadership, and of his pure and unworldly life, July 20th, 1909."

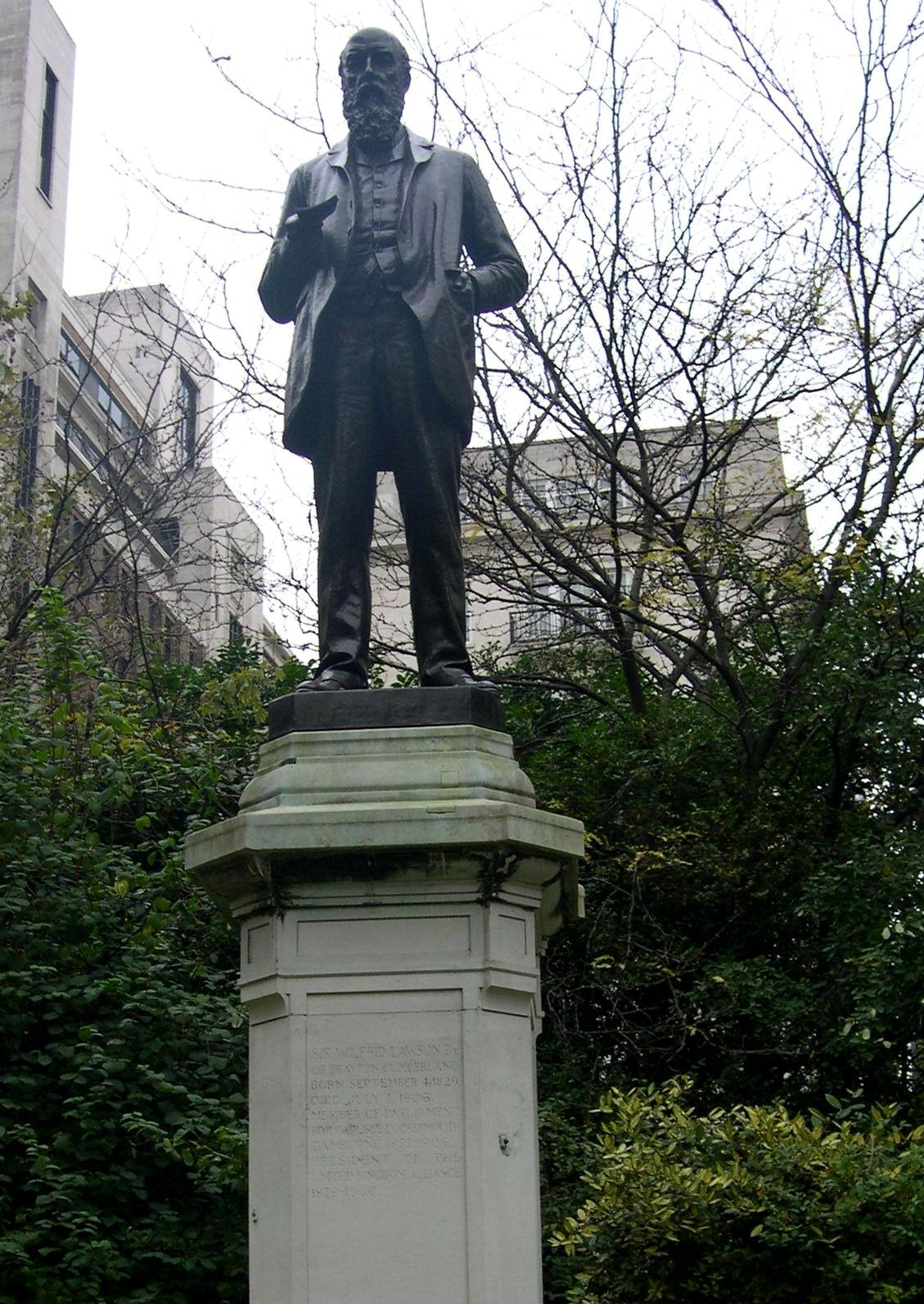
Statue of Sir Wilfrid Lawson in the Victoria Embankment Gardens

== See also ==
- Scottish Permissive Bill and Temperance Association

== Bibliography ==
- Carrick, Terry. "Wilfrid Lawson: Attitudes and Opinions on Britain's Imperial and Foreign Policy (1868–1892)" (PhD dissertation, Sheffield Hallam University; ProQuest Dissertations & Theses, 2007. 10694308).
- Oxford Dictionary of National Biography, Vol. 32, (Oxford 2004) online
- Parry, Jonathon. The Rise and Fall of Liberal Government in Victorian Britain, (Yale University Press, 1993) online
- Robinson, Ronald, and John Gallagher with Alice Denny. Africa and the Victorians: The Official Mind of Imperialism (Macmillan, 1967) online

=== Older studies ===
- Sir Wilfrid Lawson by W B Luke (Political Biography published by Simpkin Marshall of London in 1900).
- Sir Wilfrid Lawson A Memoir Edited by G W E Russell (Political Biography published by Smith Elder & Co. of London in 1909).
- Some Notable Cumbrians by Sir F. Chance (Published By Thurnhams Carlisle 1931)

=== Primary sources ===
- Wisdom Grave & Gay Being Selected Speeches of Sir Wilfrid Lawson on Social Reform &c Edited by R A Jamieson (Published by S W Partridge & Co of London in 1889).
- Cartoons in Rhyme And Line By Sir Wilfrid Lawson and F Carruthers Gould (Published by T Fisher Unwin of London in 1905).
- A Diary of Two Parliaments: Disraeli's Parliament 1874–1880, Henry. W Lucy, published in 2 Vols, (London 1885)
- Life and Letters of Sir James Graham, 1792–1861, Vol. 2, Charles Stuart Parker, (London 1907)

Parliament of the United Kingdom
Preceded by William Nicholson Hodgson; Sir James Graham	Member of Parliament for Carlisle; 1859–1865; With: Sir James Graham 1852–1861; Edmund Potter 1861–1874	Succeeded by William Nicholson Hodgson; Edmund Potter
Preceded by William Nicholson Hodgson; Edmund Potter	Member of Parliament for Carlisle; 1868–1885; With: Edmund Potter 1861–1874; Robert Ferguson 1974–1886	Succeeded by Robert Ferguson
Preceded by Charles James Valentine	Member of Parliament for Cockermouth; 1886–1900	Succeeded by Sir John Randles
Preceded by William Sproston Caine	Member of Parliament for Camborne; 1903–1906	Succeeded by Albert Dunn
Preceded by Sir John Randles	Member of Parliament for Cockermouth; 1906–1906	Succeeded by Sir John Randles
Baronetage of the United Kingdom
Preceded by Wilfrid Lawson	Baronet (of Brayton, Cumberland); 1867–1906	Succeeded by Wilfrid Lawson
