= Sir Wilfrid Lawson, 1st Baronet, of Brayton =

English landowner, businessman and investor

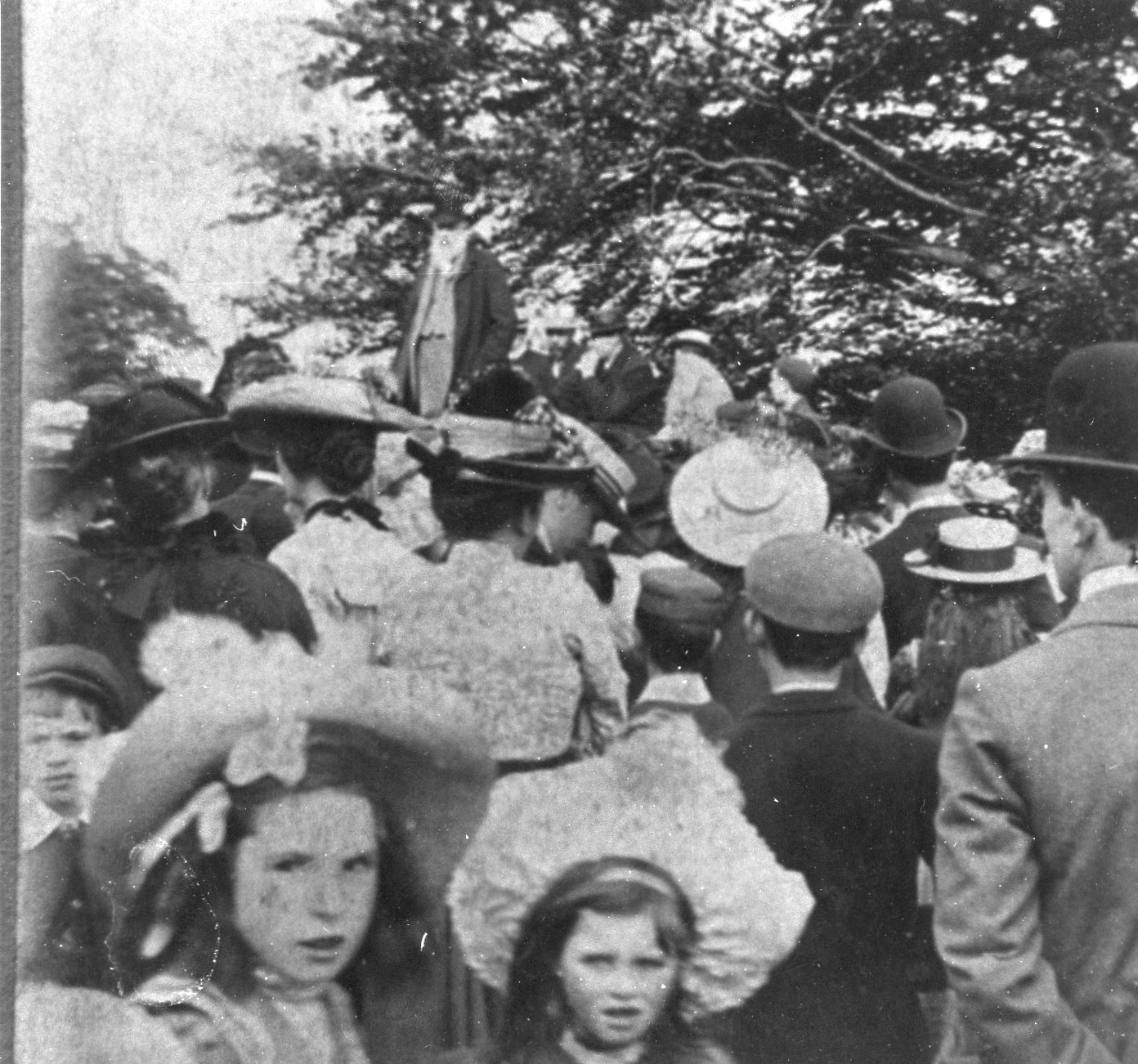
Sir Wilfrid Lawson 1st Baronet of Brayton

Sir Wilfrid Lawson, 1st Baronet, of Brayton (5 October 1795 – 12 June 1867), was an English landowner, businessman and investor in the new industrial age. He was of the Lawson baronets.

== Early life ==
After the death of Sir Wilfrid Lawson, 10th Baronet in 1806, the title expired and the estates passed to the nephew of his wife, Thomas Wybergh, the son of Thomas Wybergh of Clifton Hall, Westmorland who assumed the name and arms of the Lawson family. Six years later Thomas drowned off the coast of Madeira and having no direct heirs the estates passed to his younger brother Wilfrid, who likewise assumed the name of Lawson. In 1821, he married Caroline Graham, sister to the famous Peelite statesman, Sir James Graham of Netherby. Their marriage produced eight children; four sons, Wilfrid, Gilfrid, William and Alfred; and four daughters, Caroline, Elizabeth, Catherine and Maria.

== Wybergh connections ==
The Wybergh family, long established in North Westmorland, arrived in the district of St Bees, sometime in the 13th century. Gilbert de Engayne, the last of that ancient family in the direct line had a daughter Eleanor, who in 1364 carried the manor and demesne of Clifton near Penrith, in marriage to William de Wybergh, of St Bees. The aforementioned possessions remained the property of their descendants until the twentieth century. Eleanor Wybergh died in the reign of Henry IV of England, and the family laid her body to rest in Clifton Church, close to the old hall, where the residents placed a window in stained glass to her memory, bearing her effigy and arms. In 1524, Thomas Wybergh married a Lancaster of Melkinthorpe Hall. The family later suffered greatly in the English Civil War. In 1652, a Thomas Wybergh of St Bees, had his name attached to 'the list of delinquents', thus forfeiting the right to own his estates, which were later sold under the direct orders of Oliver Cromwell. The arms of Wybergh are 'of three bars sable, and in chief three stoiles of the last'.

After the Glorious Revolution of 1688, the Wyberghs transferred their allegiances from the Stuart's to the House of Hanover. During the rising of 1715, Thomas Wybergh a prisoner of the Jacobites was exchanged for Alan Ayacough, who had supported the Pretender. His son, also called Thomas was later involved in the 1745 Uprising.

Following Thomas's death in 1753, the estates passed to his eldest son William, who died in 1757. He was succeeded by Thomas, the father of the person under discussion, who died in 1827. Thomas married Isabel Hartley, and after their son assumed the Lawson inheritance the family settled at Isel, where they remained for many years.

== Politics ==
He was appointed Sheriff of Cumberland for 1820.

Throughout his life, Lawson took an active role in politics, where he championed the Whig (Blue) cause. He supported the extreme radical section: he was what he called a 'true blue', a supporter of the political philosophy of Charles James Fox, the constitutional republicanism of John Wilkes and in time the social reforming of Richard Cobden and John Bright. Lawson remained a constitutionalist, and wished to extend the franchise to include the masses, but he practised what he preached in his own household and family. He resented the class structure. Although his name is intimately associated with some of the political contests before the passing of the Reform Act 1832, he only stood in one election.

== Carlisle election ==
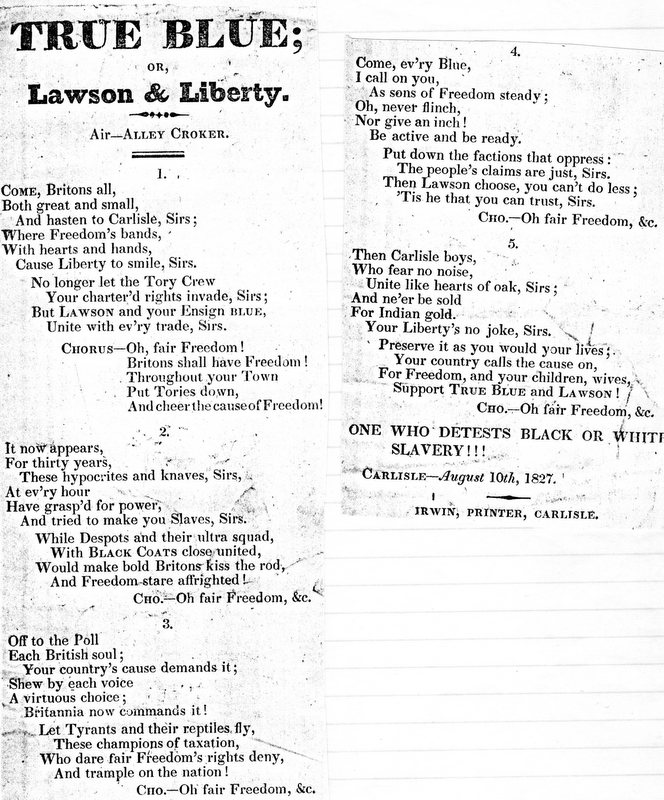
Political Song relating to the 1827 Carlisle Election

After the death of Sir Philip Musgrave in 1827, Lawson reluctantly came forward as the Parliamentary Whig (Blue) candidate for the representation of the City of Carlisle, in opposition to James Law Lushington, the Tory (Yellows) Lowther nominee. Lawson stood on the following manifesto:

"That it is essential to the general interest of the nation that the people should be free, and that it is the duty of their representatives to assert the rights of the people, redress their grievance and watch over the expenditure of public money."

— The Carlisle Journal, 21 June 1867

For radicals, freedom from obligation was a precondition for political citizenship and the cornerstone of the chartist cause; freedom was their antidote to slavery. Lawson is emphasising that parliament could only represent the people if the electorate were given the opportunity to elect representatives freely. Although he advocated reforms, Lawson senior was more of a radical in the Sir Francis Burdett tradition than a reformer, an advocate of 'going back to the roots'. As Matthew McCormack differentiates: the reformer sought to remove abuses as a means of preserving the system, whereas the radical insisted upon the necessity of a more fundamental change.

In those days, elections took place over several days. It was a time of open voting where 'tallies' or groups of ten likeminded freemen ascended a small scaffold erected adjacent to the Moot Hall, where the lord mayor publicly recorded each man's vote. They were exciting times, a theatre crammed with noise and bustle: the playing of patriotic music by rival bands; the flaunting of flags and banners; the display of party favours and colours; the processions and counters processions; and the cheering and counter cheering.

On the day of the nomination, Lawson travelled the nineteen-mile journey from Brayton in an open carriage, drawn by four horses. In the suburbs, his supporters, many of whom were ineligible to vote, withdrew the horses and dragged their candidate through the streets in triumph. They proceeded, carrying a blue ensign bearing the slogan 'Lawson and Independence', to make a demonstration in front of their rivals' headquarters in the Bush Inn. Then, amidst a loud chorus of cheers, they paraded the carriage several times round the Market Cross. At the close of the poll on the opening day Lawson had received ten votes, while Lushingtons had received none.

On the second day, Lawson recited a letter written by a voter from Edinburgh, who had received a message signed by one of Lushington's election agents enclosing £10, inviting the receiver to journey to Carlisle and vote accordingly. "But" added the writer, "I have returned the £10, and I shall be in Carlisle on Tuesday to vote for Lawson." This example of political virtue was regularly referred to throughout the campaign. Marred by rain, the day ended with a brawl after scores of Yellow supporters attacked their opponents. At the close of the second day, Lushington had received 175, while Lawson trailed with 153.

On the third day, a coach carrying Blue freemen arrived from Newcastle. At the Kings Arms, a mob of angry Yellow supporters surrounded the coach and tried to prevent the freemen from entering their headquarters. Blue supporters appeared and drove their rivals back to their committee rooms in the Kings Head. Stones, slates and items of furniture were hurled, resulting in serious damage. At the close of the day, Lushington had 276 votes to Lawson's 261. According to The Times: "It's beginning to look like a proper Carlisle election, rioting included"

On the fourth day, Lawson abandoned the election with the poll standing at Lushington 362 votes, Lawson 323. Lawson gave an explanation.

Gentlemen, at this period of the contest I have a statement to make, which I shall do without any feeling of mortification, and, as I before told you I should do, without envying my opponent, whatever feelings of triumph he may be disposed to indulge in. He has at this moment a majority of 39, after 685 votes have been polled; and, notwithstanding I have still many promised votes on which I could rely, I must admit that at this moment I do not appear to have the means of withstanding the influence of your corporation, and of the powerful family with which it is allied. But, gentlemen, however much I could have desired the success of your cause upon this occasion, I do assure you that I would rather remain for ever in retirement, than that I should have succeeded by the means to which my opponent has resorted."

Following the announcement of the withdrawal, the Yellows proceeded to seek revenge for their defeat on the previous day. Wielding bludgeons they attacked their opponents with great force, and a scene of riot and broken heads prevailed. Having wreaked their vengeance on the people they proceeded to the Liberal headquarters and vandalised the Coffee house. The day ended with the reading of the Riot Act and the arrival of the military.

== Baronetcy restored ==
In 1831, Sir James Graham, then First Lord of the Admiralty suggested to his brother-in-law.

As you possess the ancient and large property connected with an honourable title, and as you have a son to whom you may transmit the Title with the estates, it might not be disagreeable to you to have the old Brayton Baronatage restored."

Lawson accepted, and Graham conveyed his wishes to the Prime Minister of the United Kingdom, Charles Grey, 2nd Earl Grey and by such means were the Coronation honours of the reform government decided. On 1 September 1831, King William IV created Lawson a baronet.

== Temperance ==
When Lawson fell dangerously ill in 1834, he turned to religion, and sent for a Presbyterian minister named Walton who preached in the neighbouring village of Blennerhasset. His health restored, he befriended the Home Mission Society, whose purpose was to send missionaries into neglected villages in England. He became an associate and established a House Mission Station in Aspatria. Shortly afterwards he attended a Temperance lecture, which had an immediate impact on the Lawson household.

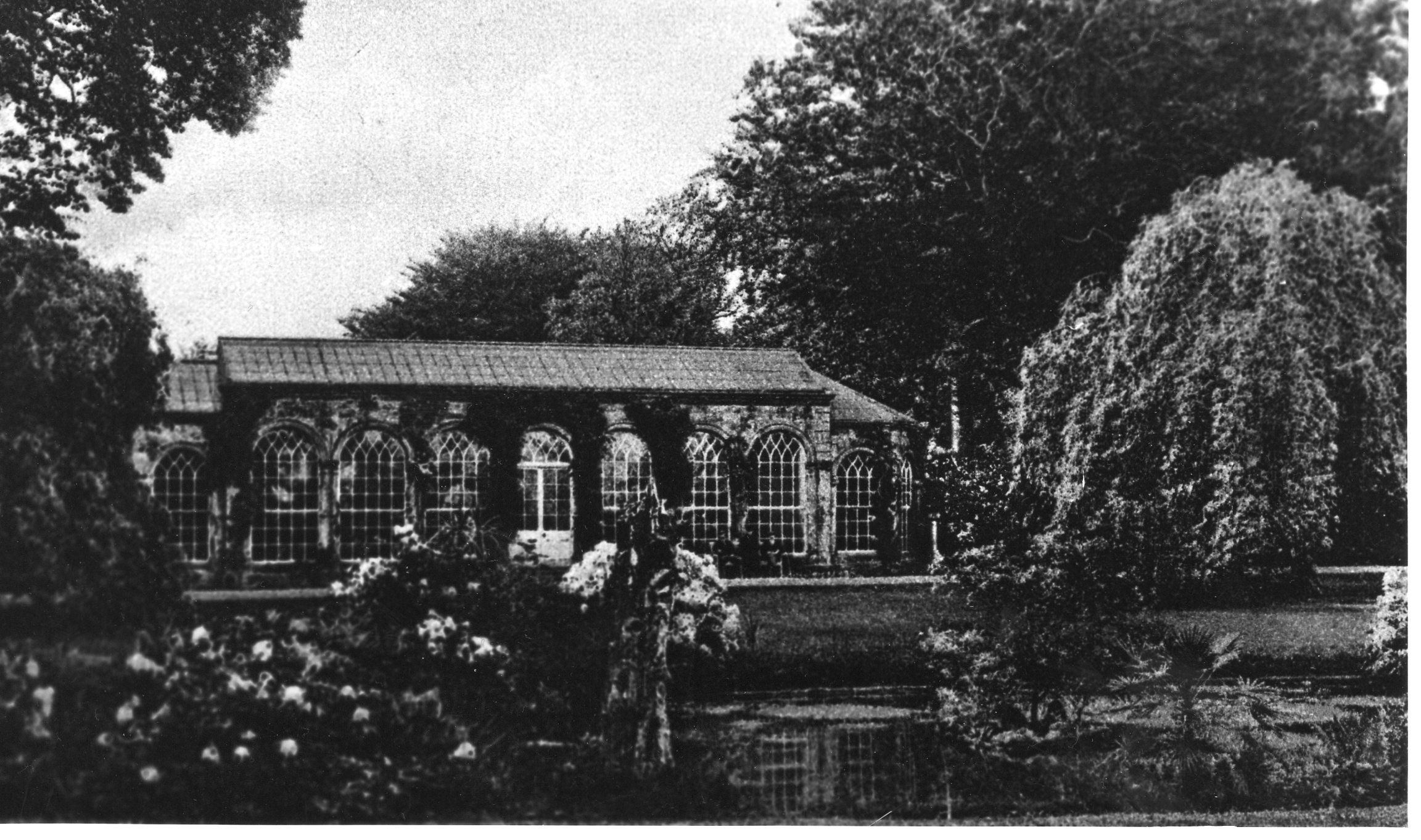
The Whisky Pond at Brayton Hall

"Sir Wilfrid Lawson of Brayton Hall, Cumberland, is said to have been so strongly impressed by the arguments of Mr (William) Pollard, who is lecturing on behalf of Temperance societies throughout the county, that he has had the whole of his Brandy, Rum, Gin and Whisky taken from his cellars at the back of the Hall, and destroyed by fire in his own presence.

A modified version of this story appeared in the Pall Mall Gazette almost fifty years later and was used to vilify the baronet's son.

"An amusing instance of the zeal displayed by the more enthusiastic advocates of temperance is that of the late Sir Wilfrid Lawson, father of the present baronet. Old Sir Wilfrid, as the inhabitants of West Cumberland are wont to call him – on his conversions to the cause of teetotalism, had all the wines and spirits taken out of the cellars and thrown into the fishpond at Brayton Hall, thereby causing great destruction of life, to the astonished and unoffending fish."

Thus was born the legend of the Whisky Pond. In 1878, Samuel Smiles published a biography, of George Moore of Mealsgate, which noted a visit made by Moore and the Lord Mayor of London, to Brayton in 1854.

"Sir Wilfrid Lawson and most of his family are teetotallers, but the Lord Mayor pronounced his wines, the best he had ever drank."

For many years Lawson adopted the old temperance platform, that while spirits were forbidden, wine and beer could be used as beverages. Eventually the Lawson family became great drinkers of ginger beer.

== Rebellion ==
In his younger days, Lawson was a mischievous rebel, and an ardent friend of controversy. The following examples will somewhat explain his character, and highlight the integrity and humour that he bequeathed to his family. At the pre-election dinner in 1830, prior to nominating his brother-in-law, Sir James Graham, Lawson proposed a toast, which formed the subject of much comment at the time. Sir James had been speaking of the right and duty of the people to resist despotic powers as exercised against their liberty, when Lawson, rose to propose a toast.

"That the heads of Don Miguel, King Ferdinand (VII of Spain) and Charles Capet (Charles X), be severed from their bodies and rolled in the dust – and the more speedily the better."

The vociferous cheers with which his sentiment was received showed that the feelings of the speaker were shared by his audience. It was however much condemned by the opposing press on the following day.

== Liberalism ==
An incident occurred in 1837, which demonstrates Lawson's independent character. It happened after Graham infuriated his constituents by accepting a position in the Tory government. At the ensuing election, his former supporters nominating rival candidates then flocked into the constituency to show their contempt. Cavalcades of horsemen, sporting banners and flags, many of whom had ridden many miles, stood in a line, four abreast, stretching over half a mile in length. One flag bore a black gamecock, with yellow legs and comb, and a large white feather in its tail. It carried a motto, 'The Renegade Cock of the North', in reference to Graham's sobriquet. Another carried a yellow flag at half-mast, bearing a portrait of Graham lying on his back, with the slogan, 'Sir James Crow, jump about, wheel about, and fall just so'. While a coat turned inside out with yellow sleeves hung from the top of one Flagstaff. Lawson sat at the head of the concourse and was the first to defy his brother-in-law, resulting in Graham's only defeat in that city. It was also said that Lawson's neighbours and fellow landowners, who in private remained on intimate terms, would, when they met in the streets of Carlisle, walk out of their way rather than be seen discussing issues with a man of such character.

== Reform ==
During the reform agitation that preceded the introduction of the Reform Act 1867, Lawson came out of political retirement to chair several meetings held on behalf of the non-electors of Carlisle. his speeches left the listener with little doubt of his allegiance.

"There are few persons now, I think, who would say that the great mass of their fellow-countrymen are not fit to perform such simple acts of citizenship as that of voting for a member of parliament. When the unenfranchised, as a class are spoken of, I suppose the working classes are meant. Now I think the working classes of this country are capable of forming an intelligent opinion of what is for the good of the country and as likely to make an honest, independent, and patriotic use of the franchises any class of the community. I cannot understand how any Christian man can wish to deprive his fellow countrymen of any privilege he possesses himself. But it is said, 'they are so numerous'! Well if they deserve the character, which by common consent is acceded to them, the more numerous such persons are the better for the country. Let it be remembered, that the House of Commons is called, and intended to be, the representation of the people of this country, which it can scarcely be said to be when but it represents one fifth part of our adult population. I am afraid you must be prepared for a severe struggle before this question of reform is settled, a struggle perhaps more severe than that for the Reform Bill of 32. You will have to devote a great deal of time and perseverance to the prosecution of this movement if you are in earnest of this matter. It is a duty you owe to yourselves and to your unenfranchised fellow countrymen who will derive the benefits, and it is a duty from which I think you shall not shrink. The Tories talk of forming a great constitutional party. I quite agree with them. We are that great constitutional party."

== Agricultural matters ==
owning a large landed estate, Lawson took a deep interest in the progress of agriculture, particularly in the adoption of modern methods. In 1837, he entered into a partnership with the inventor Joseph Mann of Abbey Holme. For three years they experimented with early reaping machinery. However, although the equipment cut the stalks satisfactorily, it failed to process the grain. Lawson spent thousands of pounds improving land cultivation and water drainage. He was also an enthusiastic breeder of Shorthorn cattle.

== Philanthropy ==
As a philanthropist, he contributed unselfishly to the welfare of his neighbours. He supported schools throughout the local district and in other parts of the United Kingdom, trying to spread the Evangelical religion. In 1825, he was the principal subscriber to the inauguration of a Free school at Aspatria; and later a similar institution solely for girls. He was the principal proprietor of Christian News, the organ of the Evangelical Union, published in Glasgow. He remained a strict teetotaller and founder member and a principal donator to the United Kingdom Alliance. He supported the Congregationalists in Aspatria, and supplied the means of erecting their chapel at Aspatria. He also donated a piece of land for use as a cemetery.

== Businessman ==
Although previous generations had increased the Lawson estate through judicious marriages and careful purchases, this Sir Wilfrid exploited the spirit of the new industrial age, becoming an ardent supporter and early investor in the growth of railways. He was the principal shareholder and personality in the Maryport and Carlisle Railway Company, he held shares in the London and South Western Railway; the Manchester, Sheffield and Lincolnshire Railway; the Great Western Railway; the North Eastern; Cockermouth and Workington Railway; London Bridge and Charring Cross; Great North of England Railway; Darlington and Barnard Castle Railway; Stockton and Darlington; South Durham and Lancashire Union Railway; Forth and Clyde Junction Railway; in addition to the Liege and Numur railway. He was a man of considerable wealth, who also held shares in several large hotel companies and turnpike trusts. Besides the family estates of Brayton and Isel, he also owned considerable freehold and customary estates at Fitz, Arkelby, Mechi, Littlethwaite and Meregill; in Whinfell, Loweswater and Lorton; and of Parkhouse in Torpenhow and Newbiggin Grange at Ireby. Through his business acumen, he became a man of considerable wealth, who bequeathed a large estate and a sum of over £300,000 to his eldest son.

== Finally ==
On 12 June 1867, Sir Wilfrid Lawson died at Brayton, he was in his 71st year. In accordance with his wishes, the funeral was conducted by his lifelong friend, the Rev. Professor Kirk of Edinburgh, without ostentation or parade. The funeral procession numbered four simple mourning carriages, containing family and servants. Notwithstanding his wishes, hundreds followed the cortege. The following reminiscence, by Miss Elizabeth Lawson, captures her father's life.

"Our father was greatly interested in all efforts for the good of his fellow-men, and frequently 'Deputations' from various religions, social and political societies used to come to Brayton. Religious services were frequently held in the house, and in the neighbouring villages; which we used to attend. It often caused surprise that our father was so keenly interested in religious meetings, while at the same time he kept up his old interests in country sports and occupations. He enjoyed a long days shooting and hunting almost to the end of his life, and in skating and playing hockey on the ice he often tired out many younger men. He was extremely fond of open-air life, and had a most enthusiastic love of our Cumberland lakes and mountains often taking a few days refreshment in driving about them. He was a very silent man, but he certainly had the power of attaching people to him in a greater degree.".

The Dowager Lady Lawson, died on 1 November 1870 at her residence at Arkelby Hall, she was 77 years of age; her obituary recorded:

"Lady Lawson possessed a kind heart and a benevolent dispossession and her death will be much regretted"

== Bibliography ==
- Russell, G. W. E., ed. (1909). Sir Wilfrid Lawson: A Memoir. London.
- J. T. Ward (1967). Sir James Graham. New York.
- Samuel Smiles (1891). George Moore – Merchant and Philanthropist. London.
- Brian Harrison (1971). Drink & The Victorians – The Temperance Question in England 1815–1872. London.
- Mathew McCormack (2005). Radicalism and Electoral Independence: 1760- 1820. From London Politics (ed.) Mathew Cragoe and Anthony Taylor. London.

Baronetage of the United Kingdom
New creation	Baronet (of Brayton); 1831–1867	Succeeded by Wilfrid Lawson
