= Scottish Permissive Bill and Temperance Association =

British citizen organisation entirely outside of political parties

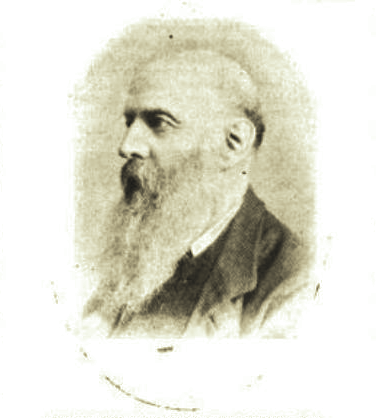
Sir Wilfrid Lawson, "Father" of the Scottish Permissive Bill

Scottish Permissive Bill and Temperance Association was a British citizen organisation entirely outside of political parties. It was established in Glasgow, October 1, 1858. Its membership included persons of all types of political opinion. The "Father" of the Scottish Permissive Bill itself was Sir Wilfrid Lawson, 2nd Baronet, of Brayton.

== History ==
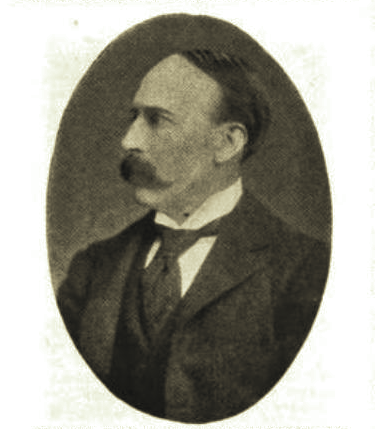
Archibald Cameron Corbett, President of the Association, 1908

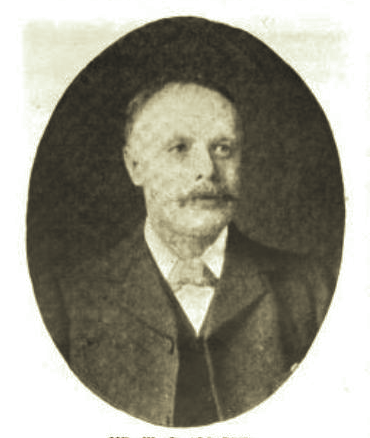
William J. Allison, Secretary of the Association, 1908

It was formed to assist in procuring the entire suppression of the Liquor Traffic by the power of the national will, and through the form of a legislative enactment. Up to that time the temperance movement in Scotland had been conducted largely on moral suasion lines, but the founders of this Association, while fully recognising the principle of Total Abstinence carried out into consistent practice, as the only certain remedy for intemperance, were convinced by long and painful experience that it was next to impossible to secure anything like a general reception of and fidelity to its principles while the licensed temptations of the Drink Traffic existed, and that its suppression was only possible through the united efforts of moral reformers, whether abstainers or not. They resolved, therefore, to endeavour to unite the power and influence of the Scottish abstainers with that of all who saw the necessity for the suppression of the Liquor Traffic in the best interests of the Commonwealth.

The Scottish Permissive Bill and Temperance Association worked in full harmony with the United Kingdom Alliance, especially in promoting the Permissive Bill of Sir Wilfrid Lawson, Bart., M. P. It was for a number of years cooperated with Peter McLagan, Esq., M.P., who introduced into the House of Commons the Local Veto (Scotland) Bill, which provided that the ratepayers, in any area or district, may, by their direct votes, suppress all licenses for the sale of intoxicating liquors in such area or district, should they desire to do so. This Bill was brought forward session after session by Mr. McLagant. Its principle was adopted in the separate Veto Bills for England, Wales, and Ireland.

The Association carried on the agitation by means of public meetings, lectures, conferences, the promotion of electoral organisation, letters to the public press, the interviewing of all candidates for Parliamentary honours, and the distribution of literature. The Social Reformer, a monthly journal, was started in 1866 and carried on until 1885, when it was merged in the Reformer, a weekly newspaper of eight pages, which circulated as The Scottish Reformer all over Scotland.

The Association had six agents, resident in various Districts of the Country, and four general and financial agents. It also employed several occasional agents, besides receiving valuable help from many volunteer advocates. The income of the Association during the first year of its existence was £202.0.5; for the year ending September 30, 1892, the amount was £4353.9.3. The list of subscribers in 1859 numbered 207, while in 1892, it was 7,857.

The first President and chairman of Executive was James Torrens, Esq., J.P., Glasgow, who occupied the latter position. until his death in 1884. The President in 1893 was John Wilson, Esq., M.P., and the chairman of Executive James L. Selkirk, Esq., J.P., one of the founders of the Association. Mary Cranston Mason was a foundation member of the Ladies' Auxiliary of the Association, and after serving in different capacities, was president of that Auxiliary from 1903.

While the Association gave its best help to every measure brought forward in the interests of true Temperance, it never swerved from its belief in the inherent evil of the Drink Traffic.
