= Mary Cranston Mason =

Scottish social worker and temperance leader (1846–1932)

- Born: Mary Cranston; 22 April 1846; Edinburgh, Scotland
- Died: 1932 (aged 85–86)
- Occupations: social reformer; temperance leader; school board member; hotel manager
- Known for: President, Ladies’ Auxiliary, Scottish Permissive Bill and Temperance Association
- Spouse: George Mason (m. 1872)
- Relatives: Sir Robert Cranston (brother); Kate Cranston (cousin)

Mary Cranston Mason (1846–1932) was a Scottish hotelier, social reformer, and temperance leader. She served as President of the Ladies' Auxiliary of the Scottish Permissive Bill and Temperance Association and was a prominent member of the Glasgow school board, where she assured that temperance lessons were included in the curriculum. At the same time, Mason also managed Cranston's Waverley Temperance Hotel in Glasgow.

== Early life ==
Mary Cranston was born in Edinburgh on 22 April 1846. She was a daughter of Bailie Robert Cranston (1815–1892), of Edinburgh, who was one of the temperance pioneers of Scotland, and his first wife, Elizabeth Dalgleish. Robert's cousin, George Cranston, was the father of Kate Cranston, a leading figure in the development of tea rooms in Scotland. Sir Robert Cranston, who served as Lord provost of Edinburgh, was Mary's brother.

== Career ==
On 12 June 1872 she married George Mason, a Glasgow merchant. In that city, she managed "Cranston's Waverley Temperance Hotel".

Born in the atmosphere of total abstinence and of organized opposition to the liquor traffic, Mason came by inheritance into those convictions and activities which led the Scottish women into a concerted temperance movement. She was a co-founder of the Ladies' Auxiliary of the Scottish Permissive Bill and Temperance Association. After serving in different capacities, she became president of that organization in 1903. Under the auspices of the Auxiliary, social meetings were held in the schools every winter that included instructive programs regarding the ill-effects of alcohol use. With Mason at its head, the Auxiliary took an active part in all the local and national movements by which Scotland participated in temperance reform.

For a still longer period, she was a prominent member of the Glasgow school board, having supervision of the temperance lessons taught in every school within the board's authority. Mason served, too, on the Juvenile Delinquency Board.

== Death ==
Mary Cranston Mason died in 1932.
