= William Lawson (co-operator) =

English agriculturalist and pioneer co-operator

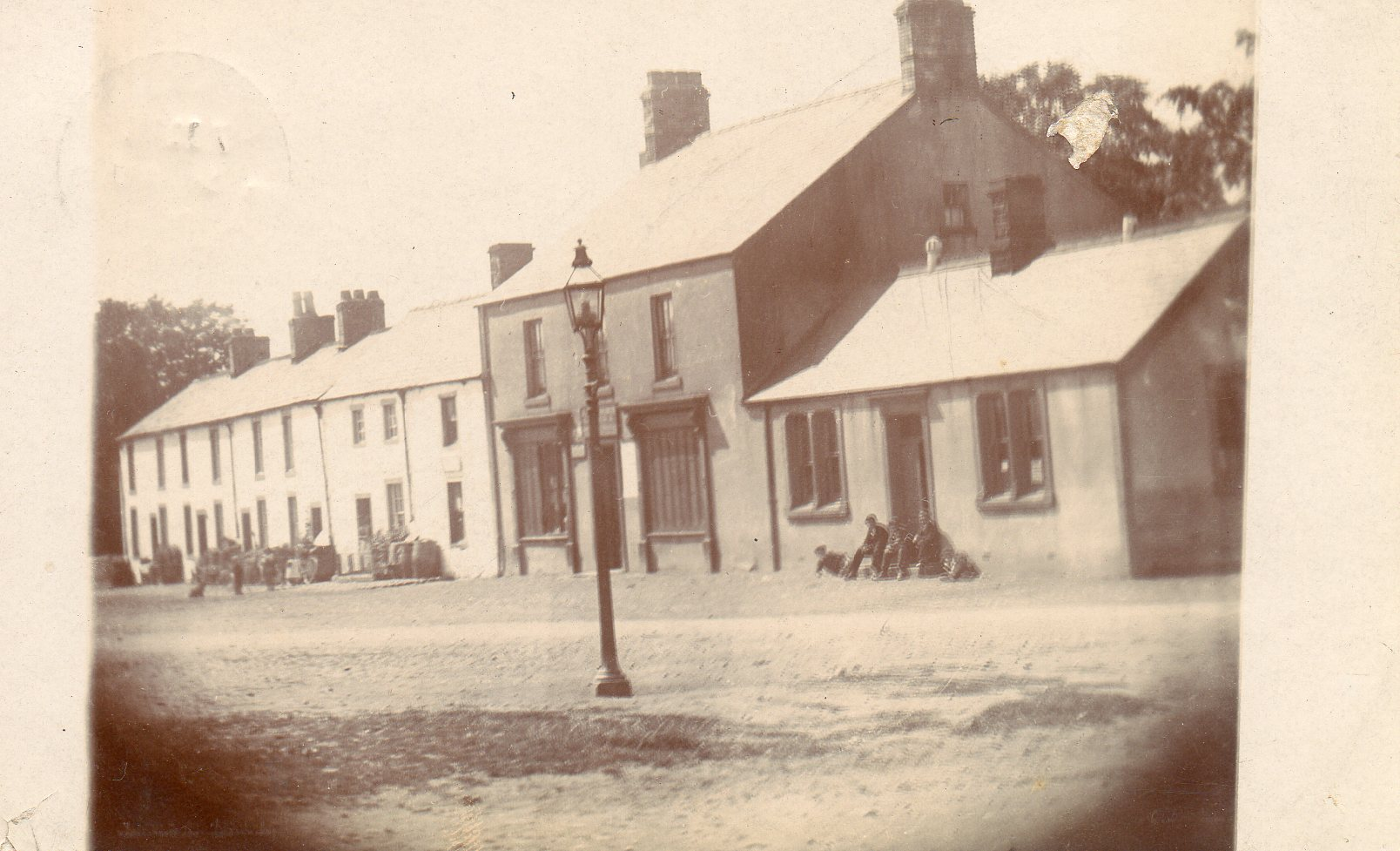
The cooperative store at Blennerhasset which William Lawson established

William Lawson (1836–1916) was an English agriculturalist and pioneer co-operator. Lawson owned an experimental farm in Cumberland between the years 1862 and 1872.

== Early life ==
William Lawson was born at Brayton, Aspatria, in Cumberland in 1836. Together with other members of his family, he received his education at home, where he later declared: "I learned as little as possible." His parents, Sir Wilfrid and Caroline Lawson, he remarked, "were more anxious that their children should be happy and good than that they should be learned and great." However, the children did acquire considerable learning; and at least one member later became great. In his youth, Lawson travelled extensively throughout Europe and the Middle East. At home, he took an active role in field sports, where he managed the Cumberland Foxhounds for his brother, who had acquired some hounds from the famous pack belonging to John Peel. In 1861, he became a vegetarian, and gave up hunting and shooting, which he henceforth called ‘barbarous sports’. Later he recalled: "I found himself in my 25th year, without an occupation, without many acquaintances, except amongst the poor, whom I had not learned to despise because they spoke bad grammar and took their coats off to work."

Seeking for a worthwhile occupation, he packed his saddlebags, mounted a pony at his father's gate, and set off for London, to experience his own ‘rural rides’. The journey via Caldbeck, Penrith, Appleby, Leeds, Sheffield, Chatsworth, Nottingham, Leamington, Oxford and Uxbridge took thirty-three days. During his travels, he visited old acquaintances and made many new ones. He visited steel works at Sheffield and lace manufacturers in Nottingham. As a member of a rural community, he took a particular interest in agricultural matters and noted in his journal that the highest wages earned by farm labourers was two shillings and eight pence (13p) per day. Upon his arrival in London, he learned of Alderman Mechi's experimental farm at Tiptree Hall, Kelvedon, Essex, and sought to visit it. Mechi's modern methods, his technique of irrigation using liquid manure, his advanced sowing procedures and the novelty of housing livestock on boards above the ground left a memorable impression. Upon his return, he tried to convince his father to adopt modern scientific solutions. Although his father preferred the traditional methods, he allowed his son to experiment on a farm in his own right. In 1863 Lawson and George Moore of Whitehall, Mealsgate invited Mechi to explain his methods to an invited audience of fifty practical farmers.

== Agriculturalist ==
In his autobiographical journal, ‘Ten Years of Gentleman Farming’, published in 1874, Lawson humorously alluded to his three big mistakes; the purchase of a steam plough; the procurement of low priced guano; and the elevation of his father's coachmen to the position of headman. All of these occurred upon his possession of Blennerhasset Farm in 1862; an estate his father had previously purchased for the sum of £17,000. The estate comprised 333 acres (135 ha), and incorporated a water wheel, a group of cottages, and a number of derelict farm buildings. In the weeks before assuming control of the farm Lawson travelled extensively throughout Britain seeking agricultural advice, visiting many good farms and farming districts; particularly those that applied ‘model farming’ techniques. Lawson began a programme of improvement. He bought an additional 87 acres (35 ha) of land. He changed the title to the ‘Model Farm’, then to Mechi, and later back to the Blennerhasset Farm. He removed miles of unwanted fences, thousands of tons of stone, constructed miles of new roads, and drained the waterlogged land. Besides the farming scheme, he also established a market garden, artificial manure works, a laboratory, a free library, a free school, a gas works, a medical dispensary and several grocery stores. He also contracted the steam cultivator, and founded a flax business.

== Co-operator ==
Following conversations with the farming fraternity, Lawson began to formulate a procedure for dealing with the difficulties of managing the farm labourers. It occurred to him that the best way of overcoming these obstacles was to make the labourer a direct partaker of the farm profits. He became acquainted with the ways of Sir John Gurdon, who in 1831 sponsored a co-operative farm at Assington Hall, Suffolk. Co-operation became an obsession, and the farm a vehicle for studying the subject. He acquainted himself with its many forms. Those designed to maximise the profits of the shareholders; those devised for increasing the wages of the workers; and those developed to secure the maximum dividend for the purchaser. Lawson wished to introduce a system that encapsulated these ideals, a system to benefit the vast majority of the public; a system he affectionately termed the ‘Public Good’. Using public meetings, he helped to establish a Cooperative Store System in the town of Aspatria, an establishment that prospered for over a century. Largely through his efforts, the local inhabitants of Dearham, Wigton and Alston adopted similar stores in their districts.

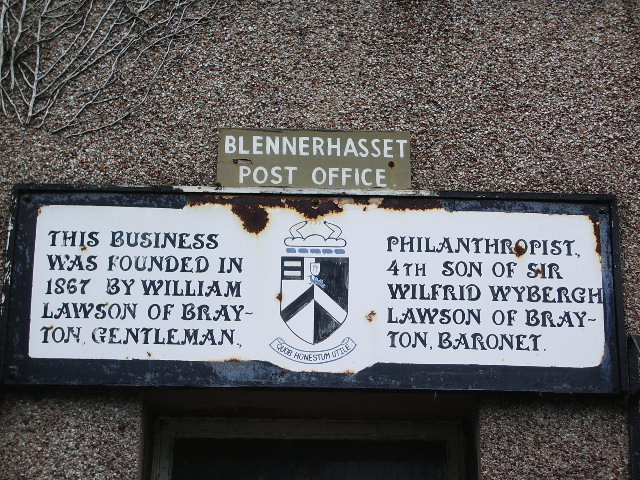
The sign over the doorway of the former Blennerhasset post office

However, when Lawson tried to convert these theories into practice by offering equally to share a portion of his profits amongst his workers he met strong opposition. He genuinely believed that his workers would embrace the opportunity and was astonished by their indifference. He attempted to allay their consternations, posing the question, "Is it desirable that the workers on this farm should be the direct partakers of its proceeds?" He referred to the previously mentioned ‘Society Farm’ at Assington, Suffolk where thirty labourers had successfully tenanted a farm using an interest free loan from the owner. He encouraged self-expression and a vote by secret ballot but to no avail. Of the eleven voters, only one voted for ‘co-operation’, while the remainder voted for ‘every man for himself’. He tried to relieve their consternations by inviting the entire community to work with him as cultivators of the soil, not for him as master, where all comers would participate in the generated profits. Of the fifty-three eligible voters, forty-seven initially expressed an interest, however, after he published the value of the investment and the anticipated rewards from its success, their apathy increased and they withdrew their support. The villagers held the opinion: ‘If all the people were equal to-day, they would be unequal to-morrow’.

Lawson persevered. In 1866, he published a new statement, offering, ‘co-operation to all comers regardless of their opinion’, declaring that he would donate all that year's profits above 2.5 per cent to the public good. He included profit exchangeable tickets with wages, a response that captured their imagination such that when he deliberately forgot to include a ticket, they quickly reminded him of the error. At the end of the qualifying period, the balance sheet showed an excess of £181 over the set target. However, since he had already allocated £142 to the public good, this left £39 for profit sharing. After discussions, each full-time worker voted to receive a sum of fifteen shillings. They donated the remaining £9 to a fund to establish a cottage hospital at Aspatria. Those administering the fund later bestowed the grant for ambulance work in the Franco-Prussian War.

In 1870, ‘the year of the great bonus’ Lawson finally achieved his objective. He began by issuing the following address.

TO MY WORKERS
"I shall give, as bonus, to ordinary time-worker, in proportion to time worked (exclusive of extra and overtime), one-quarter of this year's declared income arising from my present capital, clear of all current expenses, for public good; but should such income exceed £1,000, I shall give as bonus half its excess over £500."

When put to the vote, thirty-one members favoured implementation, while seventeen remained unconvinced. The wording of the notice depicted a significant change, for he would now base the final calculation upon his entire capital, inclusive of his outside investments. When later published, the balance sheet showed a profit of £1,715. He awarded £546 to his full-time workers, each of whom received £11. However, in the final year of the scheme, there were no further payments, primarily because of the blighting of the potato crop and the devastation caused by the ‘Great Fire’. The disastrous fire began after the gas works manager repaired a fault with a lighted candle. Although no one suffered injury, the subsequent explosion ignited a heap of loose hay, and quickly spread to the dutch barn, packed to the roof with the recent harvest. The intensity of the blaze was such that within half an hour the flames were visible to the inhabitants of Wigton. The insurance company paid damages of £1,000. Regarding co-operation, in many respects Lawson took a huge gamble. He was, in the words of George Jacob Holyoake, probably the only man in England prepared to commit his entire fortune to promote a scheme that many regarded as folly.

In 1863, Lawson opened a 'people's shop' or co-operative store in the village of Blennerhassett, which for many years displayed the words "William Lawson, Licensed Dealer in Tea and Tobacco", chalked on a blackboard over the entrance door. This curiosity originated after the registrar of the Companies Act refused to register him as a ‘gentleman’. The administrator refused to accept a ‘gentleman’ as the promoter of a company of rustic provision dealers. On the gable end of the shop, he painted, in gold letters on a brown background, a larger and more significant emblem, ‘The Snuff Shop & General Mart’. The shop window also advertised a variety of wares, including seeds, specimens of manure, crushed bones, mint lozenges, notepaper and envelopes. During this period the storekeeper was elected by the village parliament using a system of universal suffrage. Although the total turnover for the small store exceeded £5,200, the accumulated loss totalled £43. The shop remains open for business today and has a sign above the entrance door stating its history. To help dispose of the farm produce Lawson later established three other shops in Newcastle, Ireby and Carlisle. The northeast store closed in 1869, with accumulative debts of £545.

== Village Parliament ==
Following the failure of the co-operative offer of 1866, Lawson established an ‘Open Council’, later renamed the ‘Village Parliament’, so called because it evolved from the remnant of the previous council, thrown open to include all the members of the village. It had one primary objective, to convert the people into prosperous and intelligent self-directing people. The council held their daily meetings after dinner and restricted the duration to thirty minutes. However once they became popular the committee rescheduled them to a three-hour period on a Saturday afternoon, resulted in the workers receiving payment for debating. He also introduced a suggestion scheme whereby labourers could receive 2s 6d for every adopted proposition. Although the members held the right to vote for wage increases they rarely abused this privilege. They were very aware that any unjustifiable increase would diminish the amount of money available to the fund for the ‘Public Good.’ One successful resolution proposed the establishment of a village post-office. This led to an inspection by a government official, and the subsequent installation of a receiving box. On another occasion, a labourer posed the question "Is the manager fit to manage?" What an unpleasant experience, a manager having to argue and prove the worthiness of his position to not only his workforce but also to the entire village.

From a commercial perspective, the Blennerhasset Parliament was a romantic institution. While from the citizen's viewpoint of enlarging ideas, interest and independence, it was a remarkable undertaking. Besides settling disputes about the running of the farm, it reconciled arguments within the neighbourhood. Such that if Jane Jones had grievance against her next door neighbour, Mary Smith, she could give notice to the secretary of her intentions to bring it before the Parliament; on condition that the grievance be paraded before the village, on the day before the confrontation. This procedure allowed the plaintiff sufficient time to reflect and adjust or temper her original language. Another advantage occurred after an aggrieved worker wished to make long-winded complaints privately. The listeners found it very convenient to refer him to the Parliament. Where the greatest talker in private, often became the person with the least to say, when asked to speak in public.

== Steam cultivation ==
Lawson decided to commence farming from a modern perspective and as such placed great emphasis on the inventions of the new industrial age, with particular reference to steam cultivation. In February 1862, No 95 of John Fowler's Patent Steam Ploughing Tackle arrived at Aspatria railway station. The affectionately named ‘Cyclops,’ the first of its kind in Cumberland, comprised a 12-horsepower (8.9 kW) portable steam engine, with the capacity to drive a grubber, plough, cultivator, and scarifier. Once unloaded, the 10-ton curiosity astonished onlookers when it travelled along the road without the aid of horses. On that monumental day a rustic voice called out from the crowd, "She'll nivver git up Thompson's Brow." However, it did and upon the successful ascent of what is now called ‘Station Hill’, a second voice cried, "well she's gitten up, but she'll nivver ploow!" The engine continued to promenade the streets of Aspatria, accompanied by a large concourse of people, finally arriving at Brayton Hall, the scene of the inaugural trials. After a series of mishaps, misfortunes, breakages and repairs, ploughing commenced, which provoked a bystander to remark, "Well she's gitten up Thompson's Brow, and she's ploow'd 'er fust furro', but she'll nivver pay." This criticism proved correct; for Lawson only achieved a profit in two of the ten working years. However Lawson attributed the majority of the losses to inexperience, and with the knowledge of hindsight the consensus opinion was that steam cultivation could work at a profit. In ten years, the loss upon the steam plough alone stood at £850. This was not surprising, since the cost for breakages and repairs exceeded £1,500. This figure would have reduced had the calculation considered the value of the permanent improvements to the land. They should have also offset the loss by costing the value of the unearthed stones, which Lawson used for erecting buildings and constructing roads.

The early days of the engine were not without incident. The most serious occurred in 1864 after the hire of the engine to plough at Shotton Lodge. During the descent of Baggrow Brow the travelling gear failed, and the cogwheels slipped their moorings. The engine having no brake rushed headlong down the incline, gaining momentum. Although the driver and his assistant jumped to safety, they rose to see the engine trundling towards a cottage at high speed. Fortunately for the occupants, the steering wheel made contact with an obstacle on the road, causing the engine to veer to the left and collide with a railway bridge, causing damage which is still visible today.

In September 1866, Lawson exchanged the engine for a Fowler's patented double engine system. The two contraptions affectionately known as ‘Cain’ and ‘Abel’ required 1.5 tons of coal to journey a 27-mile (43 km) distance. Although the pair, working together in tandem brought immediate improvements, they were plagued with breakages and a catalogue of catastrophes, and consequently failed to show a profit.

In 1867, after critical complaints, Lawson recalled the parliament, and proposed the removal and sale of the steam cultivator. This motion infuriated the membership, as they argued that the plough epitomised their role as ‘Model Farmers’. However, at the following meeting a packed audience voted overwhelmingly to overthrow this proposal. This threat appeared to have the desired effect and swiftly transformed an annual loss of £343 into a profit of £260. Shortly after the sale of the farm, Lawson sold the equipment for £900, half its new value.

In retrospect, Lawson's success with steam cultivation is arguable. The use of the engines undoubtedly improved the quality of the land; the appliance removed vast quantities of stones, and converted the fields into manageable plots. In a ten-year period, he successfully ploughed 281 acres (114 ha), grubbed 5,173 acres (2,093 ha), and harrowed 3,757 acres (1,520 ha). However, as with all technological innovations, someone had to take the initiative and resolve these early defective systems. Had no one accepted this challenge, then it is doubtful that inventors and manufacturers would have developed the machines we use today. Had Lawson's establishment existed solely for the generation of profits the results would have been catastrophic. However existing as it did for the public good, he could claim a measure of success.

== Public Good ==
‘Public Good’ was a term used to classify all expenditure incurred for the public advantage, whether the recipients were workers on the farm or not. In the first four years of operation, there are no accounts to record the level of expenditure. However, in the years between 1866 and 1872 Lawson spent more than £1,736 of his capital, sponsoring a variety of pioneer schemes. He gave £2 to sponsor co-operative meetings; £208 towards agricultural experiments; £340 to fund free libraries and reading rooms; £299 to promote free schooling; £7 to provide free bath rooms; £225 to establish the Noble Temple; £318 towards public assistance; and £339 to finance festivals and excursions. Although the expenditure on agricultural experiments represents a considerable proportion of the sum, benefits came with in the development of manures and the management of crops.

The Free Library and Reading Rooms offered perhaps the most beneficial use to the wider public. The library was open to all comers, and had its one and only rule on a slip of paper pasted to the front endpaper of every volume; warning the recipient, that after a loan of one month, an imposed weekly fine of one penny would obtain on the non-return of each volume. Notwithstanding the election of a lenient librarian, the institution collected an annual sum of £3 for late returns. The institution was highly successful, with a total membership subscription of 660. At its peak, the library contained over 1,800 volumes; and annually loaned over 2,400 books. The library provided a wide choice of reading material, good fiction, all forms of religious matters, history, travel, biography and poetry; it also included works by ‘undesirable, controversial, banned’ writers. For example, the complete works of Tom Paine, which so infuriated the committee that they condemned them to the fla.mes. After a protracted debate, lasting almost two years, Lawson ignited a large bonfire on the village green and although he personally disagreed with the verdict, he personally condemned his prize possessions to the flames. After the sale of the farm, Lawson removed the library to the Mealsgate district. William's sister Elizabeth Lawson also donated a similar collection to the village of Aspatria.

Lawson failed in his attempts to establish Reading Rooms in the neighbouring towns of Wigton and Maryport, notwithstanding his offer of £50 to any individual or organisation willing to promote such institutions. In 1871, he allocated an annual grant of £45 to initiate Reading Rooms in Aspatria, Bolton Gate, Blennerhasset, Ireby, Plumbland and Bothel. The latter two rejected the offer after Lawson insisted that access be open to all comers; and demanded a veto on the choice of reading material. The remainder accepted a weekly allowance of two shillings and sixpence. Each institution displayed a wide selection of national and provincial newspapers, while Lawson personally provided four American periodicals, The Nation, The Boston Investigator, The Communist and The Circular. The supply of education and books over a five-year period cost the fund almost £300. Lawson also planned to establish his ideal school. He wanted to create an environment where children would hunger for knowledge, with short hours, and the exclusion of corporal punishment. Although the free day school had seventy names on its register, the average attendance approximated fifty. The free school experiment ended in 1870, superseded by the Elementary Education Act 1870. He also established a well-attended night school with forty-five students of mixed sexes, a revolutionary institution offering scholars the luxury ‘to vote for their lessons’.

In the winter of 1868, Lawson converted a small corner of the ‘turnip house’ into a bathhouse, comprising a spray, a douche, a wooden plunge bath, and a changing trestle, a facility sadly destroyed in the 1871 fire. Lawson also offered a group of London missionaries, free access to the farm for recreational purposes at an annual cost to the fund for the public good of £60. To the credit of the workforce, they voted to entertain these visitors to the detriment of their bonus. Some of the ‘personal incidents’ experienced by Lawson bordered on the ludicrous. One afternoon, he recited the complete script of Shakespeare's 'Macbeth' to a group of labourers, who all but slept through the ordeal. He also occasionally read from 'Talpa,' 'The Chronicles of a Clay Farm,' and 'The Co-operator'. As he remarked, "The hearers listened as long as they could."

== Vegetarian festivals ==
A committed vegetarian, it was Lawson's desire to employ only like-minded people on his estate. Yet despite his efforts, he managed to enrol or convert only two confederates. Nevertheless, this did not prevent him from sponsoring his ideals on every available occasion. On Christmas Day, 1866, he held the first of his annual Vegetarian Festivals, intending to show the public the possibility of supplying a satisfactory meal for less than one penny per head. This festival of festivals captivated the imagination of the media; ridiculed in Punch, The Times, and almost every daily newspaper, including one in Nova Scotia. Entrance was open to all on the show of a free ticket, available in advance by post, or on the payment of fourpence on the day. The advertisements requested, musicians to bring their instruments; and guests their spoons. Almost five-hundred people received advance tickets; with an equivalent number bought at the gate. The tickets, curiosities in their own right, headed ‘Christmas Morn, 1866’ comprised a whimsical verse.

THE SONG OF THE TICKET
By ten precisely,
Be in sight;
Show when required,
But keep till night.

Upon arrival the guests found all three granary buildings decorated with evergreens, flags, banners, and bunting. Lawson used the largest room, with seating arrangements for over one thousand guests for music and dancing; assigning the two smaller rooms, each with a seating capacity for 400 guests, for lectures and the serving of refreshments. The formalities began with James Burns, the celebrated London gymnast reciting an amusing sketch entitled, ‘How to read a man like a book’. At noon Lawson served a ‘fruit, grain, and vegetable meal’, consisting of raw turnip, boiled cabbage, boiled wheat, boiled barley, shelled peas, oatmeal gruel, boiled horse beans and boiled potatoes. He also presented a salad, made from chopped carrot, turnip, cabbage, parsley and celery, served with a congealed sauce made from boiled linseed. There were no condiments and since everything was cold except the potatoes, one can only imagine the guest's apprehension, as they sat down to dinner. To compensate for the poorly prepared meal each guest upon rising from the table received an apple and a biscuit. The total cost of the ingredients was less than £8. The entertainment continued in the afternoon with a colourful concert comprising gymnastic displays, music, songs and speeches. During the afternoon, the two 14-horsepower (10 kW) steam engines set off with whistles screaming to lead a procession through the farm. Around five in the afternoon guests received an ‘evening meal’, followed by a lecture entitled, ‘Diet and the Health of the Human Body’. However unpalatable these proceedings may appear today the guests appreciated the proceedings. The problems arose from lack of experience, a shortage of cooking facilities, and from Lawson's insistence that the food comprise a truly national flavour, thus excluding rice, raisins, currants, pepper, sugar, salt and other readily available imports. Notwithstanding these drawbacks, public opinion suggested that the lectures and experiments were ample compensation for the dissatisfaction caused by the bland food. The second festival was equally successful, and although Lawson levied a small charge for food, he did provide bread and beef. Lawson hailed the third festival as a Social Science Congress, with a series of lectures covering a wide variety of scientific topics. Again, food was free and although beef and ham were available, the meal consisted in the main of rice boiled with currants and raisons. On this occasion, the application for free tickets was so immediate and numerous that after receiving almost 3,000 requests he closed the offer on 3 December, although ruined by rain, observers recalled two novel events, labourers using Cain's boiler to heat the water to mash tea, and an attempt by Lawson to introduce a non-smoking policy. In total, Lawson sponsored five festivals, the first four on consecutive Christmas days, while the fifth celebration took place in July, in a meadow adjoining the River Ellen.

In addition to festivals, there was the annual mid summer outing, which saw fifty excursionists sitting on wooden planks and bails of straw travelled the sixteen-mile distance in open farm carts to Keswick, where they were ‘encouraged to enjoy their own entertainment’. The single journey over bare hills and wooded roads took almost six hours to complete. In contrast, in 1867, Lawson sponsored a visit to the Paris Exhibition, offering a grant of £3 for every male and £4 10s for every female who made the journey. Lawson did not confine the grant to his workforce; almost half of the twenty attendees came from the immediate neighbourhood.

== Sunday Lectures ==
In 1871, Lawson initiated the final part of his experimental programme. He had long desired to extend his festival lectures into something more permanent and regular; and as such he promoted a series of Sunday Lectures on an array of ‘peculiar’ and ‘controversial’ subjects including Witchcraft, Geology, Atheism and Evolution. After he submitted the list of proposed lectures to Sir Wilfrid Lawson, the custodian of the only suitable meeting room in Aspatria, his brother rejected the request for a variety of reasons. Undeterred Lawson proposed the erection of a new Public Hall. He first suggested purchasing land in the centre of the town and conceived plans to erect a handsome building capable of seating 550 people, with shops and houses below. Although the scheme failed to attract the required backing, it encouraged an influential body of residents to proceed to form a company to build a market house and assembly room on the old Market Square. However, arguments erupted after Lawson demanded that every shareholder should have only one vote regardless of the number of shares owned. The meeting was extremely rowdy. Lawson led an opposition labelled ‘communists’ by their opponents; and from this turmoil came a race to establish two rival Public Halls to serve this small community. Lawson purchased a parcel of land for £220 and immediately offered it free of charge with an additional sum of £100, to any group of people willing to build a Public Hall. However, the specification demanded that the room be capable of seating 500 people with an air capacity of 50,000 cubic feet (1,400 m^{3}). He also gave a written undertaking that if they could obtain a stated number of shareholders by a certain date he would take all the remaining unallotted shares. His only proviso demanded the use, free of charge on Sundays and Christmas days for thirty years. He laid the foundation stone in April 1872 and formally opened the building twelve months later. The name Noble Temple may confound contemporary residents. While touring America, Lawson noted that local inhabitants referred to public buildings as Temples; and since the chosen site stood on Noble Fields, close to Noble Bridge, hence the name Noble Temple. The elected committee sponsored the well-attended lectures every alternate Sunday. These continued until 1885 and the necessary expenditure primarily came from the ‘Public Good’ business. The lectures featured both religious and secular subjects. It was generally found that the lectures that were the least orthodox and the least given to religious intolerance were the most instructive and the most appreciated. As a paying concern, the Noble Temple always paid a minimum dividend of 5 per cent per annum to the shareholders. After Lawson left for America, he sold most of his shares by auction at considerably below the purchased price. The building is now a Freemasons Hall.

== Blennerhasset Farm ==
Blennerhasset Farm now known locally as ‘Mechi’ remains a farm today, situated on the western fringes of the village sharing its name. In Lawson's time the buildings were substantial, covering the area of a small village; fitted with modern facilities to make it almost an autonomous community. He erected the new farmhouse and buildings in a different part of the farm and constructed the walls from the large stones removed from fields by the steam grubber. Lawson converted the original buildings into labourer's cottages and extended the village by more than twenty dwellings. He also erected a row of five new terraced cottages, each comprising three large rooms a kitchen and outhouse; they cost £132 each to build and realised a weekly rent of two shillings and sixpence.

Shortly after assuming the role of a farmer, Lawson rearranged the largest field of about 180 acres (73 ha) into a modern market garden, from where he grew a wide variety of crops. 50 acres (20 ha) of turnips, 40 acres (16 ha) of potatoes, 10 acres (4.0 ha) of flax, 12 acres (4.9 ha) of cabbages, with smaller plots of fruit trees, peas and beans; all types of cereal and a wide choice of berries. In one part a steam engine worked, continuously, preparing food for the livestock. In another, Town Gas was manufactured to illuminate the farm buildings and a substantial part of the village. There was also a smithy and small iron foundry.

Lawson divided the interiors of the extensive animal sheds into avenues, appropriately fitted with stalls to house the cattle, horses and pigs. He raised the asphalt floors above the ground allowing water to flush the waste and carry it away along underground pipes into the liquid manure tanks. Metal feed troughs, with pipes carrying water ran along the fronts of the stalls. A stable with stalls for twelve animals ran along the side. An adjoining building housed the steam machinery and included a storehouse for wheels, shares, and other ancillary equipment. To distribute the large quantity of food and bedding required by the cattle throughout the estate Lawson constructed a small railroad fitted with turntables and the necessary rolling stock. To supply the water required to create the energy needed to power the machinery and distribute the liquid manure Lawson dug a cutting from the River Ellen, which he connected to a deep underground stream, thirty feet below the site of the turbine, before pumping it into a large cistern, attached to a high tower. He used the power to saw wood, pulp turnips, crush oats, chop straw, power the flourmill, lathes and tramway's. He laid enormous quantities of iron pipes fitted with hoses made from gutta percha over the land to distribute the liquid manure. He fitted gas pendants, suspended along the stalls and stables, to light the buildings. He also erected a dairy to process the milk into butter. The laboratory was housed in a large room on the upper storey of the building and was fitted with benches and shelves containing bottles and many chemicals. This room also housed the Free Library and a printing press, which he used to produce circulars and commodity price lists. The farm had no stacks; Lawson stored all the hay in a large Dutch barn.

In 1865, Lawson's father transferred the Prior Hall Farm to his sons name, a 147 acres (59 ha) estate, situated four miles from Blennerhasset. Two years later, he also received the adjoining farms of Park House (275 acres (111 ha)), Newbigin, (150 acres (61 ha)), and the Littlethwaite estate in the Vale of Lorton. He promptly sold the latter at auction and raised £3,010. He later bought the 13 acres (5.3 ha) Prior Hall Mill estate and amalgamated all four farms. In 1868, he sold the complete 584 acres (236 ha) for £28,600.

== Financial failures ==
Although his agricultural transactions proved to be of great interest, they were far from remunerative, and ceased altogether in 1872. A glance at the balance sheet for the ten-year period shows that of the 17 defined departments only four were profitable and the total loss amounted to £18,622, a figure equivalent to almost £2,000 per year, or five percent on the average capital. He lost over £2,000 while processing cattle; the market garden showed a loss of £340, the flax works £331, the starch mill £308, and the previously mentioned shops an aggregate loss of £838. The list was extensive. The loss on land was the most disheartening; new buildings and machinery required a significant outlay, as did the extensive drainage and the uprooting of hedges. This policy of improvements should have been self-financing. It cost him £15,000 to carry out the programme of renovation and all he realised upon the resale was an additional £9,000 over the purchase value, realising a loss of £6,000. The declared loss of £7,000 accredited to the Blennerhasset Farm is a little more difficult to comprehend. The majority of these losses accrued in the first four years. Had the farm continued after 1872 these losses may have reduced. However, there were minor successes; the manure works made £235, the Prior Hall farm £1,341, cottage property £190, and American investments £1,170.

== Living in America ==
After the failure of the Mechi experiment Lawson left Cumberland and resided for many years in America, where he met and later married Miss Emilie Jane Tyler, of Wanick, Massachusetts. According to a report published in the Rocky Mountain News, Lawson purchased the Swansea Smelting Works of Denver Colorado. Immediately afterwards he placed an advertisement in the South Wales newspapers seeking recruits for the business.

== Public Good Part 2 ==
Lawson never lost his affection for ordinary people from the Aspatria district, and continued with the grants for the Public Good for a number of years. In 1874, the value of Lawson's award stood at £452. The grant included £100 for free education; £48 for free libraries; £220, subsequently lost in an attempt to establish an overseas co-operative store in Naples, Italy, £10 for the printing of manifesto's, £11 for gifts to needy people, £128, for the publication of his book, £4 to administer the Aspatria Parliament, and £11 to ventilate the Noble Temple. He also awarded a four-year annual grant to the committee of the Aspatria Parliament, valued at £100 on the proviso that the committee seek annual re-election and present an official account of their stewardship. During the initial two years, the committee used the grant in support of a free school in the Noble Temple. When a clique of scurrilous characters took control of the Parliament in the following year they closed the school and transferred the children to two local schools, Lawson's agent, Miller Tiffin, aroused public awareness and rescued the endowment by securing the election of a new committee.

The statements for the years 1874-76 demonstrate the extent of Lawson's business misgivings. In 1874, the principle investment of £21,300 in Wisconsin Bonds became worthless. While in 1876, his remaining investments in American securities decreased in value by £6,300; a slight improvement on the previous performance when he lost £9,000. The committee expended the 1878 grant in the following manner. They sent 129 children to the Board School, Aspatria, 16 to the Infant School, and 29 to the Blennerhasset School. They also divided equally a sum of £5 between the reading rooms in the two villages. Lawson's donation continued after 1879, under the stipulation that the committee would consist of both men and women.

A statement of the results for 1882, showed that the business suffered a loss of £5,322, which reduced the capital from £4,288 to a deficit of £1,034. The report also stipulated that the valuation of the different kinds of property was reasonable, and these would probably realise a profit. The report also observed the loss of £1,422 besides the £25,000 set apart in 1872, to operate for the Public Good. However he still had £20,225 capital in the business, and remained optimistic of retrieving past losses.

== Later life ==
In the long tradition of the Lawson family, he held advanced views on most subjects. He was a dedicated advocate of the temperance movement, a supporter of free trade, and strongly opposed to militarism. In later life his views occasionally appeared in newspapers. In 1905, he dispatched a series of ‘peace packages’ composed of thirteen leaflets denouncing the violence of war. One leaflet contained the following rhyme.

To die for your country is all very fine,
And it makes her to you seem a debtor;
But I stick to the doctrine that's yours and that's mine,
That to live for your country's far better!

Another asked the younger generation to uphold the following pledge. "I promise to do no murder, and to enter neither the Army nor the Royal Navy." He distributed hundreds of these packages; 1,500 throughout the United Kingdom, while numerous others went to Russia, Japan, France, Germany, New Zealand, Bulgaria, Brazil, San Salvador and South Africa. Although the editors of 27 leading newspapers received portfolios, only the Westminster Gazette gave any coverage.

His dispatched his final composition from the Bay Hotel, Falmouth in 1916. Written with a shaky hand and entitled simply ‘The War’. It appeared in the columns of The West Cumberland Times a few days before his death.

"Sir, if our side wins this war, as seems probable, our side, undoubtedly, will dictate the terms of peace; and if Germany wins Germany will dictate the terms; and if neither side wins we shall have to wait and see. There is no good reason why love of one country should make people hate other countries; and international warfare is an abominable thing even when it is applauded by clergymen of both sides."

== Bibliography ==
- William Lawson; Charles D. Hunter (1874). Ten Years Of Gentleman Farming at Blennerhasset, with Co-operative Objectives. London.
- J. D. Rose; M. Dunglinson (1987). Aspatria: A Cumbrian Town. Chichester: Phillimore & Co Ltd. ISBN 978-0-85033-635-1.
