= Cobdenism =

Economic ideology named after Richard Cobden

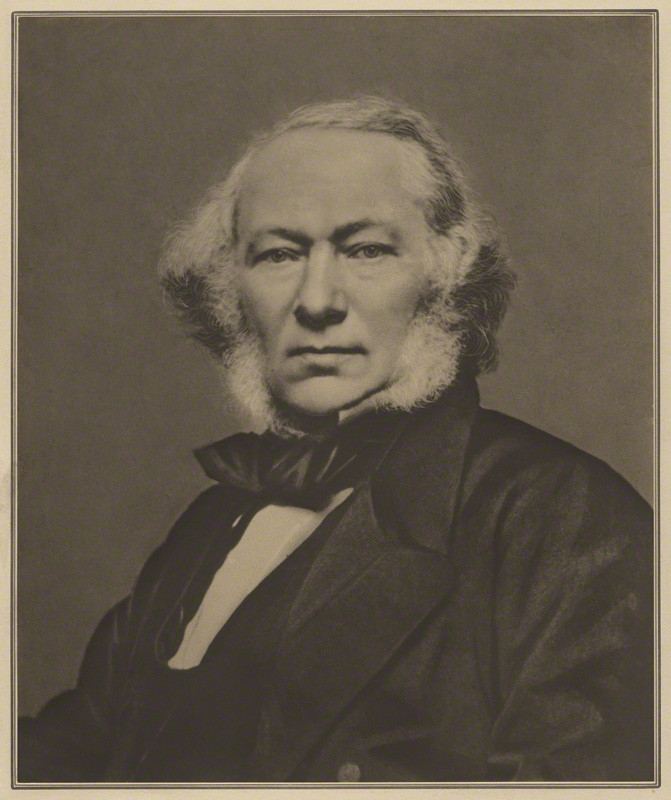
Richard Cobden, after whom Cobdenism is named

Cobdenism is an economic ideology (and the associated popular movement) which perceives international free trade and a non-interventionist foreign policy as the key requirements for prosperity and world peace. It is named after the British statesman and economist Richard Cobden and had its heyday of political influence in the British Empire during the mid-19th century, amidst and after the endeavour to abolish the Corn Laws.

Based on Adam Smith's assertion that full employment and economic growth require access to foreign markets, Cobden perceived the expansion of foreign trade as the main means of increasing global prosperity and emphasized the importance of the international division of labour for economic progress. Akin to his ideal of Britain as an industrial society of small cooperating property owners, he believed in an international order of small, independent nations attaining shared prosperity through international trade. As Cobden saw Britain's involvement in empire as an unwelcome distraction of domestic investment into its industrial capacity, his writings became influential in anti-imperialist circles, being picked up by e.g. John A. Hobson. Moreover, it influenced the economic thinking of John Maynard Keynes, who was a staunch adherent of Richard Cobden's theories prior to the First World War, after which he abandoned Cobdenism in favor of "insular capitalism".

Rarely used today and already in decline by the end of the 19th century, Cobdenism was revived by some academics during the 1980s to support the liberalization of the British economy.

== See also ==
- Manchester Liberalism
