= Sheriff of Cumberland =

Secular office of the Crown

The sheriff is the oldest secular office under the Crown. Formerly the sheriff was the principal law enforcement officer in the county but over the centuries most of the responsibilities associated with the post have been transferred elsewhere or are now defunct so that its functions are now largely ceremonial. The sheriff changes every April.

The post of Sheriff of Cumberland existed from the creation of the county in the twelfth century up until 1974 when the administrative and ceremonial or geographic county of Cumberland became part of Cumbria.

== List of sheriffs ==
Sheriffs of Cumberland have included:

=== 1100–1199 ===
- c.1100 – 1112: Richerius
- bef. 1129: Odard
- 29 September 1129: Hildret
- 29 September 1157 – 1171: Robert fitz Truite
- 29 September 1172: Robert fitz Truite and Adam his son
  - 29 September 1173: Adam son of Robert Truite
- 29 September 1174: Robert de Vaux
- 29 September 1175 – 1183: Robert de Vaux
  - 29 September 1179: Roger de Leicester
- 21 April 1185 – 1186: Hugh de Norwich
  - 29 September 1186: Nicholas his brother
- 29 September 1187: Nicholas de Norwich
- 29 September 1188: William FitzAldelm
- 29 September 1197: Robert de Tateshall
- 29 September 1198: William de Stuteville
  - 29 September 1198: John L'Aleman
- 18 April 1199: Hugh Bardulf

=== 1200–1299 ===
- 29 September 1200: William de Stuteville
  - 29 September 1200: John l'Aleman
  - 29 September 1201: Philip Escrop
- Easter 1203: Robert de Curtenai
  - Easter 1203: Alan de Caudebec
- 1 December 1204: Roger de Lacy
  - 29 September 1204: Walter Marescallus
- 29 September 1209: Hugh de Neville
- 30 January 1213: Robert de Ros
  - 29 September 1213–1214: Alan de Caudebec
- 7 January 1216: Robert de Vieuxpont
- 11 February 1222: William de Rughedon and Walter Mauclerk
- 17 March 1222: Walter Mauclerk
  - 29 September 1222–1223: Alan de Caudebec
- 29 September 1223: Walter Mauclerk
  - 29 September 1224: Robert FitzWilliam de Hamton
- 29 September 1225: Walter Mauclerk
  - 29 September 1225: Robert FitzWilliam de Hamton
  - 29 September 1230: Thomas FitzJohn
- 27 January 1233: Sir Thomas Moulton
- 5 February 1236: Charles de Garderoba
- 30 March 1236: John de Mora (with Dacre)
- 30 May 1236: William de Dacre (with Mora)
- 29 September 1236: William de Dacre
- 29 April 1248: John Balliol
- 22 August 1255: Robert de Brus, 5th Lord of Annandale
- 28 October 1255: William de Forz, 4th Earl of Albemarle
  - 29 September 1255: Remigius de Pocklington
- Michaelmas 1259: William de Forz, 4th Earl of Albemarle
- May 1260: Robert de Mulcaster
- 9 July 1261: Eustace de Balliol
  - 29 September 1261: Matthew of York
- 20 September 1265: Roger de Leybourne
  - 20 September 1265: Walter de Morton
- 24 October 1268: Sir Radulf de Dacre, of Dacre
- 26 October 1270: Robert de Chauncy
  - 29 September 1270: Ralph de Pocklington
  - 29 September 1271: Mathew Cordil and Roger de Pocklington
- 8 May 1272: Richard de Crepping
- 17 October 1274: Robert de Hampton
- 27 October 1277:John de Swynburn
  - 27 October 1277: Michael de Newbiggin
- 25 October 1278: Gilbert de Corwen
- 14 April 1282: William de Boyvill
- 2 May 1283: Sir William de Boyvill (elected by the county)
- 18 April 1283: Robert de Brus, 5th Lord of Annandale
- 24 June 1285: Sir Michael Harclay
- 14 June 1298: William de Mulcaster

=== 1300–1399 ===
- 3 December 1303: John de Lucy
- 7 October 1304: William de Mulcaster
- 26 March 1307: Alexander de Bassenthwaite
- 18 November 1308: Gilbert de Colewenn
- 4 October 1309: Alexander de Bassenthwaite
- 10 April 1310: John de Castre
- 15 October 1311: Andrew Harclay
- 15 December 1311: John de Castre
- 25 January 1312: Andrew Harclay
- 5 February 1316: John de Castre
- 8 June 1318: Andrew Harclay
- 20 July 1318: Anthony de Lucy
- 8 April 1319: Andrew Harclay
- 11 February 1323: Anthony de Lucy
- 23 July 1323: Henry de Malton
- 24 March 1325: Hugh de Lowther
- 13 April 1325: Robert le Brun
- 4 February 1327: Peter Tilliol
- 5 December 1330: Ralph Dacre
- 27 January 1336: Richard de Denton
- 8 February 1338: Rowland de Vaux
- 12 May 1338: Anthony de Lucy
- 19 November 1341: Hugh de Moriceby
- 5 November 1345: Thomas de Lucy
- 16 April 1350: Richard de Denton
- 3 November 1351: Hugh de Louthre
- 4 March 1354: William de Lye
- 15 March 1354: Hugh de Louthre
- 16 January 1355: William de Threlkeld
- 10 November 1356: Robert Tilliol
- 3 November 1358: William de Lancaster
- 1 October 1359: Matthew de Redman
- 24 March 1360: Christopher Moresby
- 10 December 1361: Robert Tilliol
- 20 November 1362: Christopher Moresby
- 16 November 1366: Robert Tilliol
- 20 May 1367: William de Windsor
- 27 November 1368: Adam Parnyng
- 5 November 1371: John de Denton
- 12 December 1372: Sir Robert Mowbray
- 7 November 1373: Sir John de Derwentwater
- 12 December 1374: John de Denton
- 7 October 1375: Sir John de Derwentwater
- 26 October 1376: John Bruyne
- 9 March 1377: Roger de Clifford, 5th Baron de Clifford
- 26 November 1377: John Derwentwater
- 25 November 1378: William de Stapleton
- 5 November 1379: Sir Gilbert Curwen
- 18 October 1380: Sir John de Derwentwater
- 1 November 1381: Amand Monceaux of Whinfell
- 24 November 1382: Sir Robert Parvynges
- 1 November 1383: Amand Monceaux of Whinfell
- 11 December 1384: John Thirlwall, the younger
- 20 October 1385: Amand Monceaux
- 18 November 1386: John Thirlwall
- 18 November 1387: Sir Peter Tilliol
- 1 December 1388: Sir John Ireby
- 15 November 1389: Richard Redman
- 7 November 1390: Sir Christopher Moresby
- 21 October 1391: Sir John Ireby
- 18 October 1392: Sir Thomas Musgrave
- 1 November 1393: Sir Richard Redman
- 9 November 1394: Sir Peter Tilliol
- 1 December 1395: Sir John Ireby
- 1 December 1396: Sir Richard Redman
- 3 November 1397: Sir William Curwen
- 17 November 1398: Sir Richard Redman
- 30 September 1399: Sir William Leigh

=== 1400–1499 ===
- 24 November 1400: William Lowther
- 8 November 1401: Sir Richard Redman
- 29 November 1402: William Osmundlaw
- 5 November 1403: Sir Peter Tilliol
- 22 October 1404: Sir John Skelton
- 22 October 1405: Richard Skelton
- 5 November 1406: William Lowther
- 23 November 1407: Sir Robert Lowther
- 15 November 1408: Sir John Skelton
- 4 November 1408: John Delamore
- 29 November 1409: Robert Rodington
- 10 December 1411: Sir Richard Redman
- 6 November 1413: James Harington
- 10 November 1414: William Stapleton
- 1 November 1415: Sir Christopher Curwen
- 30 November 1416: Sir John Lancaster
- 10 November 1417: Sir William Osmundlaw
- 4 November 1418: Sir Robert Lowther
- 24 November 1419: Sir John de Lamplugh
- 16 November 1420: William Stapleton
- 1421: William Stapleton of Edenhall and Richard Ratcliffe of Derwentwater
- 1 May 1422: Sir Nicholas Radcliffe
- 14 February 1423: Sir William Leigh
- 13 November 1423: Sir Christopher Curwen
- 6 November 1424: Sir Christopher Moresby
- 15 January 1426: Sir Nicholas Radcliffe
- 12 January 1427: Sir John Penington
- 7 November 1427: Sir Christopher Curwen
- 4 November 1428: Sir Thomas Moresby
- 10 February 1430: Thomas de la More
- 5 November 1430: Sir John Penington
- 26 November 1431: Sir John Skelton
- 5 November 1432: Sir John de Lamplugh
- 5 November 1433: Sir Christopher Curwen
- 3 November 1434: Sir John Penington
- 7 November 1435: John Broughton
- 8 November 1436: Henry Fenwick
- 7 November 1437: Sir Christopher Curwen
- 3 November 1438: Sir Christopher Moresby
- 5 November 1439: Hugh Lowther
- 4 November 1440: John Skelton
- 4 November 1441: William Stapleton
- 6 November 1442: Thomas Beauchamp
- 4 November 1443: Thomas de la More
- 6 November 1444: Sir Christopher Curwen
- 4 November 1445: John Skelton
- 4 November 1446: John Broughton
- 9 November 1447: Thomas de la More
- 9 November 1448: Thomas Crackenthorpe
- 20 December 1449: Sir Thomas Curwen
- 3 December 1450: John Skelton
- 3 November 1451: Roland Vaux
- 8 November 1452: Thomas de la More
- 29 September 1453: vacant
- 4 November 1454: John Hudleston
- 4 November 1455: Hugh Lowther
- 17 November 1456: Thomas Curwen
- 7 November 1457: Richard Salkeld
- 7 November 1458: Henry Fenwick
- 7 November 1459: Sir John Penington
- 7 November 1460: Christopher Moresby
- 6 March 1461: Richard Salkeld
- 7 November 1461: Roland Vaux
- 5 November 1463: Sir John Hudleston
- 5 November 1464: Sir Thomas Lamplugh
- 5 November 1465: Richard Salkeld
- 5 November 1466: Roland Vaux
- 29 September 1467: vacant
- 5 November 1468: Sir John Hudleston
- 5 November 1469: Sir William Leigh
- 6 November 1470: Richard Salkeld
- 10 June 1471: Sir Christopher Moresby
- 9 November 1471: Sir William Parr
- 9 November 1472: Sir John Hudleston
- 5 November 1473: Sir William Leigh
- 5 November 1474: Sir Richard Curwen
- 18 February 1475: Richard, Duke of Gloucester
  - 29 September 1474: Sir John Hudleston
  - 29 September 1477: John Crackenthorpe
- 6 November 1483: Richard Salkeld
- 12 September 1485: Sir Christopher Moresby
- 5 November 1486: Richard Kirkeby
- 4 November 1487: Sir Christopher Moresby
- 4 November 1488: Thomas Beauchamp
- 5 November 1489: Sir John Musgrave
- 5 November 1490: Henry Denton
- 5 November 1491: Lancelot Thirkeld
- 26 November 1492: Edward Redman
- 7 November 1493: Sir John Musgrave
- 5 November 1494: Sir Richard Salkeld
- 5 November 1495: Sir Christopher Moresby
- 12 February 1497: Thomas Beauchamp
- 5 November 1497: Christopher Dacre

=== 1500–1599 ===
- 1 December 1505: Sir John Hudleston
- 27 November 1506: Hugh Hutton
- 3 December 1507: John Ratcliffe
- 15 December 1508: Hugh Hutton
- 14 November 1509: Sir Thomas Curwen
- 9 November 1510: Sir John Penington
- 8 November 1511: John Skelton, of Armathwaite
- 7 November 1512: John Crakenthorpe
- 14 April 1514: Sir Edward Musgrave
- 7 November 1514: Sir John Ratcliffe
- 26 April 1516: Sir John Lowther, of Lowther
- 10 November 1516: Sir Thomas Curwen
- 9 November 1517: Gawen Eaglesfield, of Alneburgh Hall
- 8 November 1518: Sir John Ratcliffe
- 8 November 1519: Sir Edward Musgrave
- 6 November 1520: Thomas Fairfax
- 3 February 1522: Sir Christopher Dacre
- 12 November 1522: John Penington
- 13 November 1523: Sir John Ratcliffe
- 10 November 1524: Christopher Curwen
- 27 January 1526: Sir Christopher Dacre
- 7 November 1526: Sir John Ratcliffe
- 16 November 1527: Sir Edward Musgrave
- 7 November 1528: Sir William Penington
- 9 November 1529: Thomas Wharton
- 11 November 1530: Richard Ireton
- 9 November 1531: Sir Christopher Dacre
- 20 November 1532: Sir William Musgrave
- 17 November 1533: Sir Christopher Curwen
- 14 November 1534: Cuthbert Hutton
- 22 November 1535: Sir Thomas Wharton
- 27 November 1536: Sir Thomas Curwen
- 14 November 1537: Sir John Lamplugh
- 15 November 1538: Thomas Thwaites
- 17 November 1539: Sir Thomas Wharton
- 17 November 1540: Thomas Dalston
- 27 November 1541: Sir William Musgrave
- 22 November 1542: Sir John Lowther, of Lowther
- 23 November 1543: Thomas Salkeld
- 16 November 1544: Edward Aglionby
- 22 November 1545: Robert Lamplugh, of Dovenby
- 23 November 1546: Thomas Sandford
- 27 November 1547: Sir Thomas Wharton
- 3 December 1548: John Leigh, of Isel
- 12 November 1549: John Lamplugh
- 11 November 1550: Sir John Lowther, of Lowther
- 11 November 1551: Richard Eaglesfield
- 10 November 1552: William Penington
- 8 November 1553: Thomas Leigh, of St Bees
- 14 November 1554: Sir Richard Musgrave
- 14 November 1555: Thomas Sandford
- 13 November 1556: Richard Eaglesfield
- 12 April 1557: Robert Lamplugh
- 16 November 1557: John Leigh, of Isel
- 23 November 1558: William Penington
- 9 November 1559: Thomas Dacre, senior, or of Lanercost
- 12 November 1560: Thomas Lamplugh
- 8 November 1561: Sir Hugh Askew, of Seaton Priory
- 20 March 1562: Henry Curwen
- 19 November 1562: William Musgrave
- 8 November 1563: Anthony Hudleston
- 9 November 1564: Sir Thomas Dacre
- 17 July 1565: Christopher Dacre
- 16 November 1565: William Penington
- 18 November 1566: Richard Lowther, of Lowther
- 18 November 1567: John Dalston
- 18 November 1568: Cuthbert Musgrave
- 12 November 1569: Simon Musgrave
- 13 November 1570: Sir Henry Curwen
- 14 November 1571: George Lamplugh
- 13 November 1572: John Lamplugh
- 10 November 1573: William Musgrave
- 15 November 1574: Anthony Hudleston
- 15 November 1575: Henry Tolson
- 13 November 1576: John Dalston
- 27 November 1577: George Salkeld, of Corbridge
- 17 November 1578: Francis Lamplugh
- 23 November 1579: John Lamplugh
- 21 November 1580: Sir Henry Curwen
- 27 November 1581: Christopher Dacre
- 5 December 1582: Wilfred Lawson
- 25 November 1583: John Dalston
- 19 November 1584: John Midleton
- 22 November 1585: George Salkeld
- 14 November 1586: John Dalston
- Michaelmas 1587: George Salkeld
- 25 November 1588: Richard Lowther, of Lowther
- 24 November 1589: Sir Henry Curwen
- 24 November 1590: Christopher Pickering
- 25 November 1591: John Southwike
- 16 November 1592: William Musgrave
- 26 November 1593: Gerard Lowther
- 21 November 1594: John Dalston
- 27 November 1595: Lancelot Salkeld
- 22 November 1596: Christopher Dalston
- 25 November 1597: Wilfred Lawson
- 28 November 1598: Thomas Salkeld
- 2 December 1599: Joseph Pennington

=== 1600–1699 ===
- 24 November 1600: Nicholas Curwen
- 2 December 1601: William Orfeur
- 7 December 1602: Edmund Dudley
- 1 December 1603: William Hutton
- 5 November 1604: Sir John Dalston
- 2 February 1606: Christopher Pickering
- 17 November 1606: Sir Wilfred Lawson
- 19 November 1607: Sir Christopher Pickering
- 12 November 1608: Henry Blencow
- c. November 1609: Sir William Hutton
- 6 November 1610: Joseph Pennington
- c. November 1611: Sir Christopher Pickering
- c. November 1612: Sir Wilfred Lawson
- c. November 1613: Thomas Lamplugh
- c. November 1614: Sir Edward Musgrave
- c. November 1615: Richard Fletcher
- 11 November 1616: Sir William Musgrave, of Holme
- 6 November 1617: William Huddleston, of Millom
- 9 November 1618: Sir George Dalston
- c. November 1619: Sir Henry Curwen
- 6 November 1620: John Lamplugh, of the Fells
- c. November 1621: Henry Fetherstonhaugh
- 7 November 1622: Thomas Dudley
- 11 May 1623: Edmund Dudley
- 16 July 1623: Sir Thomas Lamplugh
- late 1623: Sir Richard Sanford
- c. November 1624: Sir Richard Fletcher
- c. November 1625: Sir Henry Blencowe
- c. November 1626: Peter Senhouse
- 4 November 1627: Sir Christopher Dalston
- c. November 1628: William Layton
- c. November 1629: Sir William Musgrave
- 7 November 1630: Christopher Richmond
- c. November 1631: Leonard Dykes
- c. November 1632: John Skelton
- 10 November 1633: William Orfener
- 5 November 1634: Richard Barwis
- c. November 1635: Wilfrid Lawson
- 3 October 1636: Sir Patricius Curwen, 1st Baronet
- 30 September 1637: Sir Thomas Dacre
- 4 November 1638: Sir Timothy Featherstonhaugh
- c. November 1639: William Penington
- c. November 1640: Christopher Lowther
- c. November 1641: Sir Henry Fletcher
- c. 1643: John Dalston of Milrig
- c. November 1645: Wilfrid Lawson
- 6 February 1647: William Orfeur
- 13 February 1647: Henry Tolson
- 17 November 1647: John Barwis
- 7 November 1649: Charles Howard, of Naward
- 21 November 1650: William Briscoe
- 4 November 1651: John Barwis
- 12 November 1652: Myles Halton
- 24 March 1653: Sir Wilfrid Lawson
- c. November 1657: Sir George Fletcher, 2nd Baronet
- c. November 1658: William Penington
- 5 November 1660: Daniel Fleming
- c. November 1661: Sir John Lowther, 1st Baronet
- 1662: Francis Salkeld (Kt)
- 1663: John Lamplough
- 1664: Edward Musgrave (Kt)
- 12 November 1665: Sir William Dalston
- 7 November 1666: Richard Tolson
- 6 November 1667: William Layton
- 6 November 1668: Miles Pennington
- 11 November 1669: Thomas Curwen
- 4 November 1670: Anthony Bouch
- 9 November 1671: Richard Patrickson
- 11 November 1672: Bernard Kirkbride
- 12 November 1673: Bernard Kirkbride
- 5 November 1674: William Orfeur
- 15 November 1675: William Orfeur
- 10 November 1676: William Blennerhasset
- 17 November 1677: William Blennerhassett
- 14 November 1678: Wilfrid Lawson
- 13 November 1679: Sir George Fletcher, 2nd Baronet
- 4 November 1680: Leonard Dykes
- 10 November 1681: Leonard Dykes
- 13 November 1682: Edward Hasell
- 12 November 1683: Andrew Huddleston
- 20 November 1684: Sir Richard Musgrave, 2nd Baronet, of Hayton Castle
- 30 November 1685: Sir William Pennington, 1st Baronet
- 25 November 1686: Sir John Dalston, 2nd Baronet
- 5 December 1687: Henry Curwen
- 8 November 1688: Edward Stanley
- 18 November 1689: Sir Wilfrid Lawson, 2nd Baronet
- 27 November 1690: Richard Lamplugh
- 14 December 1691: Christopher Richmond
- 17 November 1692: Joseph Huddleston
- 16 November 1693: Henry Brougham
- 17 December 1694: Sir John Ballantine
- 5 December 1695: John Ponsonby
- 3 December 1696: John Latus
- 23 December 1697: Timothy Fetherstonhaugh
- 22 December 1698: Thomas Dawes
- 20 November 1699: Robert Carleton

=== 1700–1799 ===
- 28 November 1700: Thomas Lamplugh
- 1 January 1701: Christopher Crakenthorpe
- 19 January 1701: Richard Crakenthorpe
- 3 December 1702: John Dalston
- 2 December 1703: John Senhouse
- 21 December 1704: John Brisco
- 3 December 1705: Christopher Currwen
- 14 November 1706: Robert Pennington
- 20 November 1707: Richard Lamplugh
- 29 November 1708: Richard Hutton
- 1 December 1709: William Ballentine
- 16 July 1710: Henry Fairclough
- 26 September 1710: Robert Blacklock
- 13 December 1711: John Fisher
- 11 December 1712: Sir Charles Dalston, 3rd Baronet
- 30 November 1713: Thomas Pattinson
- 16 November 1714: Humphrey Senhouse
- 5 December 1715: Thomas Brougham, of Scales
- 25 June 1716: John Nicholson
- 12 November 1716: Henry Blencow
- 21 December 1717: Robert Lamplugh, of Dovenby
- 21 December 1718: Thomas Fletcher, of Hutton
- 6 January 1718: John Ponsonby
- 3 December 1719: John Stanley
- 3 January 1720: Joshua Laithes
- 14 December 1721: Charles Highmore, of Armathwaite
- 11 December 1722: Peter Brougham
- 7 January 1724: Joseph Dacre Appleby
- 10 December 1724: John Fletcher, of Cleahay
- 13 January 1725: Thomas Lutwich, of Whitehaven
- 29 November 1726: John Ballantine
- 16 December 1727: Edward Hasell, of Dalemain
- 18 December 1728: Gustavus Thompson
- 18 December 1729: Eldred Curwen
- 14 December 1730: Sir Richard Musgrave, 4th Baronet
- 9 December 1731: Augustine Erle
- 14 December 1732: Henry Aglionby
- 20 December 1733: John Benn, of Hensingham House, near Whitehaven
- 19 December 1734: Fletcher Parris, of Tallentire
- 18 December 1735: John Dalston, of Milrigg
- 19 January 1737: William Hicks, of Whitehaven
- 12 January 1738: John Gaskarth, of Hilltop
- 21 December 1738: Joseph Dacre Appleby
- 27 December 1739: Richard Cooke, of Cammarton
- 24 December 1740: Montagu Farrar
- 31 December 1741: Henry Fletcher, of Hutton
- 16 December 1742: Humphrey Senhouse, of Netherhall
- 5 January 1744: Jerome Tully, of Carlisle
- 10 January 1745: Joshua Lucock, of Cockermouth
- 16 January 1746: Christopher Pattenson, of Penrith
- 15 January 1746: Thomas Whitefield, of Clargill
- 14 January 1748: Walter Lutwidge, of Whitehaven
- 11 January 1749: Henry Richmond Brougham, of Highhead Castle
- 28 June 1749: John Ponsonby, of Hale
- 17 January 1750: Sir Richard Hylton, Bt of Hylton Castle
- 6 December 1750: George Irton, of Irton
- 14 January 1752: Sir George Dalston, 4th Baronet, of Dalston Hall
- 7 February 1753: Henry Curwen, of Workington
- 31 January 1754: Sir William Fleming, 3rd Baronet, of Skirwith
- 29 January 1755: Timothy Fetherstonhaugh, of Kirkoswald
- 27 January 1756: Sir Wilfrid Lawson, 8th Baronet, of Brayton
- 4 February 1757: Edward Stevenson, of Keswick
- 27 January 1758: John Senhouse, of Calder Abbey
- 2 February 1759: James Spedding, of Whitehaven
- 23 April 1759: John Gale, of Cleater
- 1 February 1760: Sir William Dalston, of Milrigge
- 28 January 1761: John Langton
- 15 January 1762: John Richardson, of Penrith
- 4 February 1763: Henry Aglionby, of Nunnery
- 10 February 1764: Henry Ellison, of Whitehaven
- 1 February 1765: Samuel Irton, of Irton
- 17 February 1766: John Christian, of Ewanrigg
- 13 February 1767: Thomas Lutwidge, of Whitehaven
- 15 January 1768: Sir Gilfrid Lawson, Bt of Brayton
- 27 January 1769: John Robinson, of Watermillock
- 9 February 1770: Sir Michael le Fleming, 4th Baronet, of Skirwith
- 6 February 1771: John Spedding, of Armathwaite
- 17 February 1772: William Hicks, of Papcastle
- 8 February 1773: John Dixon, of Whitehaven
- 7 February 1774: George Edward Stanley, of Ponsonby
- 6 February 1775: Anthony Benn, of Hensingham
- 5 February 1776: Roger Williamson, of Snettlegarth
- 31 January 1777: Robert Walters, of Whitehaven
- 28 January 1778: John Brisco, of Crofton
- 1 February 1779: Williams Hasell, of Dalemain
- 2 February 1780: Henry or Christopher Aglionby, of Nunnery
- 5 February 1781: Thomas Story, of Mirehouse
- 1 February 1782: William Dacre, of Kirklinton
- 10 February 1783: John Orfeur Yates, of Skerwith Abbey
- 9 February 1784: John Christian, of Ewanrigg
- 7 February 1785: Edward Knubley, of Wigton
- 13 February 1786: Sir James Graham, 1st Baronet, of Netherby
- 28 June 1786: William Wilson, of Brackenbar
- 12 February 1787: Thomas Whelpdale, of Skirsgill Hall
- 8 February 1788: Sir Frederick Fletcher-Vane, 2nd Baronet, of Hutton
- 26 May 1789: Thomas Denton, of Warnell Hall
- 29 January 1790: William Browne, of Tallentire
- 4 February 1791: Edward Lamplugh Irton, of Irton
- 6 February 1792: Edward Hasell, of Dalemain
- 3 February 1793: Thomas Pattenson, of Melmervy
- 5 February 1794: William Henry Milbourne, of Armathwaite Castle
- 11 February 1795: Sir James Graham, 1st Baronet, of Netherby
- 5 February 1796: James Graham, of Barrock Lodge
- 1 February 1797: Hugh Parkin, of Skirsgill
- 7 February 1798: Sir Richard Hodgson, of Carlisle
- 1 February 1799: John Hamilton, of Whitehaven

=== 1800–1899 ===
- 21 February 1800: Sir John Chardin Musgrave, 7th Baronet, of Eden Hall
- 4 June 1801: Sir Wilfrid Lawson, 10th Baronet, of Brayton Hall
- 3 February 1802: Edward Hasell, of Dalemain
- 3 February 1803: Robert Warwick, of Warwick Hall
- 1 February 1804: John de Whelpdale, of Penrith
- 6 February 1805: Charles Smallwood Featherstonehaugh, of Kirkoswald
- 1 February 1806: Joseph Dykes Ballantine Dykes, of Dovenby Hall
- 4 February 1807: John Thomlinson, of Brisco Hill
- 3 February 1808: Thomas Irvin, of Justice Town
- 6 February 1809: Miles Ponsonby, of Hail Hall
- 31 January 1810: Sir Henry Fletcher, 2nd Baronet, of Clea Hall
- 8 February 1811: John Losh, of Woodside
- 24 January 1812: Thomas Hartley, of Linethwaite
- 10 February 1813: Sir Wastell Brisco, 2nd Baronet, of Crofton Place
- 4 February 1814: Thomas Benson, of Wreay Hall
- 13 February 1815: William Ponsonby Johnson, of Walton House
- 12 February 1816: William Brown, of Tallantire Hall
- 12 February 1817: Sir Philip Musgrave, of Eden Hall
- 24 January 1818: Milham Hartley, of Rose Hill
- 10 February 1819: Thomas Salkeld, of Carlisle
- 12 February 1820: Wilfrid Lawson, of Brayton House
- 6 February 1821: John Marshall, of Hallstead
- 4 February 1822: William Crackenthorpe, of Bank Hall
- 31 January 1823: Edward Stanley, of Ponsonby Hall
- 31 January 1824: Thomas Henry Graham, of Edmund Castle
- 2 February 1825: Mathew Atkinson, of Stain Gills
- 30 January 1826: Humphrey Senhouse, of Nether Hall
- 5 February 1827: William James, of Barrock Lodge
- 13 February 1828: Thomas Parker, of Warwick Hall
- 28 April 1828: William Blamire, of Thackwood Nook
- 11 February 1829: Edward Williams Hasell, of Dalemain
- 2 February 1830: Christopher Parker, of Petteril Green
- 31 January 1831: John Taylor, of Dockray Hall
- 6 February 1832: Henry Howard, of Corby Castle
- 1833: Henry Curwen, of Workington Hall
- 1834: Henry Howard, of Greystoke Castle
- 1835: Richard Ferguson, of Harker Lodge
- 1836: Thomas Irwin, of Calder Abbey
- 1837: Sir Francis Fletcher-Vane, 3rd Baronet, of Armathwaite Hall
- 1838: John Dixon, of Knells
- 1839: Thomas Hartley, of Gillfoot
- 1840: Sir George Musgrave, 10th Baronet of Eden Hall
- 1841: James Robertson Walker, of Gillgarron
- 1842: Fretchville Lawson Ballantine-Dykes, of Dovenby Hall
- 1843: Robert Hodgson, of Salkeld Hall
- 1844: George Harrison, of Linethwaite
- 1845: Timothy Fetherstonhaugh, of the College, Kirkoswald
- 1846: Joseph Pocklington Senhouse, of Barrow House and Netherhall
- 1847: Gilfrid William Hartley, of Rose Hill
- 1848: Henry Dundas Maclean, of Lazonby
- 1849: Andrew Fleming Huddleston, of Hutton John
- 1850: Thomas Salkeld, of Holm Hill
- 1851: George Head Head, of Rickerby House
- 1852: George Henry Oliphant, of Broadfield House
- 1853: Francis Baring Atkinson, of Rampsbeck Lodge
- 1854: Thomas Alison Hoskins, of Higham
- 1855: Thomas Story Spedding, of Mirehouse
- 1856: Sir Henry Ralph Fletcher-Vane, 4th Baronet, of Hutton in the Forest and Armathwaite Hall
- 1857: Charles Fetherstonhaugh, of Staffield Hall
- 1858: Anthony Benn Steward, of Chapel House
- 1859: Gamel Pennington, 4th Baron Muncaster, of Muncaster Castle
- 1860: Philip Henry Howard, of Corby Castle
- 1861: Thomas Ainsworth, of The Flosh
- 1862: Samuel Lindow, of Cleator
- 1863: William Nicholson Hodgson, of Newby Grange, Carlisle
- 1864: Thomas Brocklebank, of Greenlands
- 1865: William Postlethwaite, of the Oaks
- 1866: Sir Frederick Ulric Graham, 3rd Baronet of Netherby
- 1867: William Edward James, of Barrock Park
- 1868: Sir Robert Brisco, 3rd Baronet, of Crofton Place, Wigton
- 1869: John Ewart, of Kingfield House
- 1870: Timothy Fetherstonhaugh, of the College
- 1871: William Banks, of Highmoor House
- 1872: George Moore, of Whitehall
- 1873: Thomas Holme Parker, of Warwick Hall
- 1874: John Lindow, of Ehen Hall
- 1875: John Porter Foster, of Killhow
- 1876: George John Johnson, of Castlesteads, Brampton
- 1877: Jonas Lindow Burns-Lindow of Irton Hall
- 1878: Frederic John Reed, of Hassness, near Cockermouth
- 1879: Henry Charles Howard, of Greystoke Castle
- 1880: James Lumb, of Homewood, Whitehaven
- 1881: Samuel Porter Foster, of Kalhow
- 1882: George Routledge of Stonehouse
- 1883: Jonas Lindow, of Ehen Hall, Cleator
- 1884: Henry Anthony Spedding, of Mire House, near Keswick
- 1885: Lamplugh Fretchville Ballantirie Dykes, of Dovenby Hall
- 1886: Henry Pearson Banks, of Highmoor House, Wigton
- 1887: Thomas Hartley, of Armathwaite Hall, Cockermouth
- 1888: Henry Fraser Curwen, of Workington Hall
- 1889: Edwin Hodge Banks, of Highmoor House, Wigton
- 1890: Henry Jefferson, of Springfield
- 1891: John Stirling Ainsworth, of Harecroft
- 1892: Humphrey Pocklington Senhouse, of Nether Hall
- 1893: George William Mounsey-Heysham, of Castletown, Carlisle
- 1894: Sir Richard James Graham, 4th Baronet, of Netherby, Longtown
- 1895: Joseph Harris, of Calthwaite Hall, Carlisle
- 1896: Louis Carruthers Salkeld, of Holme Hill, Carlisle
- 1897: Col. Thomas Angelo Irwin, of Lynehow, Carlisle
- 1898: George Graham Kirklinton, of Kirklinton Hall, Carlisle
- 1899: Wiliam Parkin-Moore, of Whitehall

=== 1900–1973 ===
- 1900: Charles Lacy Thompson, of Farlam Hall, Brampton
- 1901: Hamlet Riley, of Ennim, Penrith
- 1902: Captain William Pery Standish, of Marwell Hall, Winchester, and Breconhill Tower, Longtown, Carlisle
- 1903: Thomas Dixon, of Rheda, near Whitehaven
- 1904: Richard Heywood-Thompson, of Nunwick Hall, near Penrith
- 1905: Charles Hylton-Joliffe, of Goldicote, Stratford-on-Avon, Warwicks
- 1906: Samuel Lindow Burns Lindow, of Ingwell, Moor Row
- 1907: Frederick Ponsonby Johnson, of Castlesteads, near Brampton
- 1908: Robert Andrew Allison, of Scaleby Hall, Carlisle
- 1909: Edmund Wright Stead, of Dalston Hall, Carlisle
- 1910: Thomas Harrison Rymer, of Calder Abbey, Calderbridge
- 1911: Robert Hodgson Horrocks, of Salkeld Hall, Langwathby
- 1912: Major Charles James Grant Mounsey Grant, of The Hill, Carlisle
- 1913: Guy Joseph Pocklington Senhouse, of Netherhall, Maryport
- 1914: Edward Thomas Tyson, of Woodhall, Cockermouth
- 1915: Frederick Chance, of Morton, Carlisle
- 1916: Charles Henry Shaw, of Eden Hall, Langwathby
- 1917: Charles Liddell, of Warwick Hall, Carlisle
- 1918: Sir Joseph Turner Hutchinson, Kt., of Lorton Hall, Cockermouth
- 1919: Richard Harrison Hodgson of Western Lodge, Workington
- 1920: George Dickinson, of Eed How, Lamplugh, Cockermouth
- 1921: Sir Aubrey Brocklebank, Bt. of Boltom Hall, Gosforth
- 1922: Col. Ernest Frederick Lowthorpe-Lutwidge, of Holm Rook
- 1923: Major Frecheville Hubert Ballantine-Dykes of Dovenby Hall, Cockermouth
- 1924: Philip Henry Holt of Kingfield, Penton, Cumberland
- 1925: Andrew Gibson of Woodside, Wreay, Carlisle
- 1926: Lieut.-Col. Timothy Fetherstonhaugh of The College, Kirkoswald, Cumberland
- 1927: Brigadier-General Edward Wilfrid Spedding, of Windebrowe, Keswick
- 1928: Dayrell Eardley Montague Crackanthorpe, of Newbiggin Hall, Newbiggin, Carlisle
- 1929: Norman Fletcher of Eden Brows, Armathwaite, Carlisle
- 1930: John Anthony Spedding of Storms, Keswick, Cumberland
- 1931: Lieut.-Col. Charles Ashton James of Barrock Park, Carlisle
- 1932: John Basil Wrigley of Steelfield Hall, Gosforth
- 1933: James Westoll, of Glingerbank, Longtown
- 1934: Frederick Selby Chance, of Home Acres, Carlisle
- 1935: Col. Isaac William Burns-Lindow, of Ingwell, near Whitehaven
- 1936: John Frederick Harris, of Bowscar, Penrith
- 1937: Gerald Gordon Ley, of Lazonby Hall, Penrith
- 1938: Robert Christopher Chance, of Morton, Carlisle
- 1939: Walter James Hodgson Horrocks, of Salkeld Hall, Langwathby, Penrith
- 1940: Lieut.-Col. Cecil Henry Fairer Thompson, of Nunwick Hall, Great Salkeld, Penrith
- 1941: Frank Arnold Carr, of Mill Ellers, Dalston, Carlisle
- 1942: John Barrington Pearson, of Cardew Lodge, Dalston, Carlisle
- 1943: Frank Hamilton Keay Harrison, of Scalesceugh, Carlisle
- 1944: Major William Donald Barratt, of Leyfield, Millom
- 1945: Gerald Joseph Cuthbert Harrison of Scalesceugh, Carlisle
- 1946: Colonel Guy Joseph Pocklington-Senhouse, of Netherhall, Maryport
- 1947: Humphrey Patricius Senhouse of The Fitz, Cockermouth
- 1948: Commander Mark Edward Highton, of Dunthwaite, Setmurthy, Isel, Cockermouth
- 1949: Kenneth Miles Chance, of Southwaite Hill, Southwaite, near Carlisle
- 1950: Lieut.-Colonel Robert Geoffrey Gervase John Elwes, of Warwick Hall, near Carlisle
- 1951: Lieut.-Colonel Timothy Fetherstonhaugh, of The College, Kirkoswald, Penrith
- 1952: Major Sir Hilton Lawson, 4th Baronet, of Isel Hall, Cockermouth.
- 1953: Ronald Fryer Dickinson of Red How, Lamplugh. Workington
- 1954: Colonel Richard Barry Butler, of Garth Marr, Castle Carrock, Carlisle
- 1955: Major Charles Spencer Richard Graham of Crofthead, Longtown
- 1956: Lieut.-Colonel James Eustace Spedding, of Windebrowe, Keswick
- 1957: Commander Frederick Middleton Fox, of Fawe Park, Keswick
- 1958: Dr James Wilson-Young, of Briery House, Stainburn, Workington
- 1959: Major William John. Mounsey Gubbins of Eden Lacy, Lazonby, Penrith
- 1960: Archibald Henry d'Engayne Wybergh of Borrans Hill, Dalston, Carlisle
- 1961: Major-General George Henry Inglis, of Crosby House, Crosby-on-Eden, Carlisle
- 1962: Major Sir (Geoffrey) William Pennington-Ramsden, of Muncaster Castle, Ravenglass
- 1963: William Walker of Greenlands, Holmrook
- 1964: James Westoll, of Dykeside, Longtown, Carlisle
- 1965: Andrew Frederick Seton Chance of Garth House, Brampton
- 1966: Major-General Sir George Frederick Johnson of Castlesteads, Brampton.
- 1967: Richard Gerald Grice of Cross House, Bootle
- 1968: Humphrey Patricius Senhouse of The Fitz, Cockermouth
- 1969: John Lawie Burgess, of The Old Hall, Rockcliffe, Carlisle.
- 1970: John Pattinson, of Calthwaite Hall, Calthwaite, Penrith.
- 1971: William Steuart Trimble of Green Lane, Dalston, Carlisle.
- 1972: Major Frank Gordon Wilson of Bankfield, Kirksanton, Millom.
- 1973: Nicholas Austhwaite Stanley, of Dalegarth Hall, Eskdale.
- 1974 onwards: See High Sheriff of Cumbria

== Bibliography ==
- Hughes, A. (1898). List of Sheriffs for England and Wales from the Earliest Times to A.D. 1831. London: Eyre & Spottiswoode. (with amendments of 1963, Public Record Office)
