= Wilfred Lawson (died 1632) =

English landowner and politician

Sir Wilfrid Lawson or Lawsone (1545–1632) was an English landowner and politician who sat in the House of Commons at various times between 1593 and 1614.

Lawson was the son of Thomas Lawson of Little Usworth, County Durham and his wife Elizabeth Darrell, daughter of Constantine Darrell of Wiltshire. He was educated at Trinity College, Cambridge in 1562 and at Gray's Inn in 1564. In 1591 the Earl of Northumberland made him Lieutenant of the Honour of Cockermouth (Grand Steward of all his estates) and the Conveyor of the Commissioners of the Marches. He was High Sheriff of Cumberland in 1583. In 1593 he was elected member of parliament for Cumberland. He was High Sheriff of Cumberland again in 1597. In 1604, he was elected MP for Cumberland again. He was knighted in 1604 and in 1605 was appointed convener to the royal commission set up to govern the borders. He was High Sheriff again in 1606 and in 1612. In 1614 he was elected MP for Cumberland again.

Lawson died childless at the age of 87 years.

Lawson married as his second wife in 1572, Maud (Matilda) Redmain, previously widow of Christopher Irton who died before 1567 and of Thomas Leigh of Isel, to whom she was heiress of his estates. When she died in 1624, she conveyed her inheritance from Thomas Leigh upon Lawson. In consequence, Lawson became the sole possessor of the Isel estates which he left to his nephew William Lawson son of his brother Gilfrid. This was challenged by Mary Irton, heir of Maud Redmain.

Parliament of England
| Preceded by Sir Thomas Scrope; Robert Bowes | Member of Parliament for Cumberland; 1593; With: Nicholas Curwen | Succeeded by Joseph Pennington (MP); Christopher Pickering |
| Preceded by William Huddleston; Gerard Lowther | Member of Parliament for Cumberland; 1604–1621; With: Edward Musgrave 1604–1614; Thomas Penruddock 1614–1621 | Succeeded by Sir George Dalston; Sir Henry Curwen |
