= Hugh de Lowther V =

English nobleman

- Arms of the Lowther family
- Monarchs: Richard II, Henry IV, Henry V, Henry VI

Personal details
- Born: c. 1390 Lowther
- Died: c. 1440s

Hugh de Lowther V (c. 1390 - c. 1440s) of Lowther, was an English nobleman, knight and administrator. He served alongside Henry V at the Battle of Agincourt during the Hundred Years' War (1337–1453) He later served as Sheriff of Cumberland in 1440. His ancestor, Hugh de Lowther, was attorney general for Edward I.

== Marriage and issue ==
He married a lady of the noble Dewentwater family and had a son, also named Hugh, who was born in 1420.
