= Richard Restwold =

Richard Restwold may refer to:

- Richard Restwold (died c. 1423), MP for Cumberland
- Richard Restwold (died 1475), MP for Cumberland, Berkshire and Oxfordshire
