= Sir Richard Musgrave, 1st Baronet =

English politician

Sir Richard Musgrave, 1st Baronet (1585 – 6 November 1615) was an English politician who sat in the House of Commons from 1604 to 1611.

Musgrave was the son of Christopher Musgrave and his wife Jane Curwen, daughter of Sir Henry Curwen of Workington, Cumberland. He succeeded to the estates of Hartley and Edenhall, Cumberland on the death in 1597 of his grandfather Sir Simon Musgrave. He was knighted 25 July 1603 on the coronation of James I. In 1604, he was elected a Member of Parliament for Westmorland. He was created baronet on 29 July 1611.

Musgrave died at Naples at the age of 30 and was buried in the cathedral there.

Musgrave married Frances Wharton, daughter of Philip Wharton, 3rd Baron Wharton at the age of 14. They had one child: Sir Philip Musgrave, 2nd Baronet of Eden Hall (1607-1678), who married Lady Juliana Hutton, daughter of Sir Richard Hutton.

Parliament of England
Preceded by George Wharton; Thomas Strickland	Member of Parliament for Westmorland; 1604–1611; With: Thomas Strickland	Succeeded by Lord Clifford; Sir Thomas Wharton
Baronetage of England
New creation	Baronet (of Hartley Castle); 1611–1615	Succeeded by Philip Musgrave
