= Restwold =

Restwold is a surname. Notable people with the surname include:

- Anthony Restwold (1517–1555/60), English Member of Parliament
- Richard Restwold (died c. 1423), Member of Parliament for Cumberland
- Richard Restwold (died 1475), Member of Parliament for Cumberland, Berkshire, and Oxfordshire
