= William Bewley =

William Bewley may refer to:

- William Bewley (physician) (1726–1783), English physician
- William Bewley (New York politician) (1878–1953), New York politician
- William Bewley (MP), 15th-century MP from Cumberland
