= John Derwentwater =

14th-century English politician

Sir John Derwentwater (died c. 1396), of Castlerigg, Cumbria and Ormside, Westmorland, was an English politician.

== Family ==
Derwentwater was the son and heir of Sir John de Derwentwater of Castlerigg and Ormside, who died in 1366. Derwentwater married twice. His first wife's name is unrecorded, but they probably had one son. His second wife was Margaret née Strickland, who died long after Derwentwater, on 16 July 1449. She was the daughter and heiress of William Strickland, bishop of Carlisle and his wife, Isabel née Warcop, daughter of Thomas Warcop of Warcop, Westmorland. Derwentwater and Margaret had one daughter. Their daughter, Isabel, married Richard Restwold. Derwentwater was knighted by February 1371. The surname may have come from the place Derwentwater in their native Cumbria. Their main residence was on Lake Derwentwater.

== Career ==
He was a Member (MP) of the Parliament of England for Westmorland in 1369 and 1386, and for Cumberland in 1379 and February 1388. He was Sheriff of Cumberland during the periods 7 November 1373 – 12 December 1374, 4 October 1375 – 26 October 1376 and 18 October 1380 – 1 November 1381.

== Death ==
Sir John Derwentwater died around 1396.

Parliament of England
Preceded by Sir John Preston ?	Member of Parliament for Westmorland; 1369; With: ?	Succeeded by ? ?
Parliament of England
Preceded by ? ?	Member of Parliament for Cumberland; 1379; With: ?	Succeeded by ? ?
Parliament of England
Preceded by John de Mansergh ?	Member of Parliament for Westmorland; 1386; With: Robert Clibern	Succeeded by Thomas Blenkinsop; Thomas Strickland
Parliament of England
Preceded by Amand Monceaux; John Thirlwall	Member of Parliament for Cumberland; February 1388; With: Sir John Ireby	Succeeded by Amand Monceaux; Robert Muncaster
