= William Musgrave (disambiguation) =

William Musgrave was a physician.

William Musgrave may also refer to:

- William Musgrave (MP) (1518–1597), English politician
- Bill Musgrave (born 1967), American football coach and former quarterback
