= Sir George Fletcher, 2nd Baronet =

English politician

Sir George Fletcher, 2nd Baronet (1633 – 23 July 1700) was an English politician who sat in the House of Commons at various times between 1661 and 1700.

Fletcher was the only surviving son of Sir Henry Fletcher, 1st Baronet and his wife Catharine Dalston, daughter of Sir George Dalston. In 1645, he succeeded his father as baronet. Fletcher was High Sheriff of Cumberland in 1658 and 1680, and Vice Chamberlain to Queen Catherine of Braganza. He was member of parliament (MP) for Cumberland, representing it from 1661 to 1679 and again from 1681 to 1685. He sat a third time for the constituency from 1689 until his death in 1700.

On 27 February 1654 or 1655, he married firstly Alice Hare, daughter of Hugh Hare, 1st Baron Coleraine at Totteridge, and by her he had a son and three daughters. Fletcher married secondly Lady Mary Johnstone, daughter of James Johnstone, 1st Earl of Hartfell by 1665. He had two sons and two daughters by his second wife. Fletcher died, aged 67 and was succeeded in the baronetcy by his son oldest son Henry. His second son George became a member of parliament for Cumberland and Cockermouth.

Parliament of England
Preceded by Charles Howard; Sir Wilfred Lawson	Member of Parliament for Cumberland; 1661–1679; With: Sir Patricus Curwen, 1st Baronet 1661–1665; Sir John Lowther, 2nd Baronet 1665–1679	Succeeded by Sir John Lowther, 2nd Baronet; Richard Lamplugh
Preceded by Sir John Lowther, 2nd Baronet; Viscount Morpeth	Member of Parliament for Cumberland; 1681–1685; With: Sir John Lowther, 2nd Baronet	Succeeded by Sir John Lowther, 2nd Baronet; The Viscount Preston
Preceded by Sir John Lowther, 2nd Baronet; The Viscount Preston	Member of Parliament for Cumberland; 1689–1700; With: Sir John Lowther, 2nd Baronet	Succeeded by Richard Musgrave; Gilfrid Lawson
Baronetage of England
Preceded by Henry Fletcher	Baronet (of Hutton le Forest); 1645–1700	Succeeded by Henry Fletcher
