= William Huddleston (MP) =

Member of the Parliament of England

William Huddleston (died 1628) was an English Member of Parliament.

He was the eldest son of Anthony Huddleston of Millom, Cumberland.

He was elected a knight of the shire (MP) to the Parliament of England for Cumberland in 1601 and was appointed High Sheriff of Cumberland for 1617–18.

He died in 1628 and was buried in Millom church. He had married Mary Bridges of Gloucestershire and had 7 sons and 8 daughters.

Parliament of England
Preceded by Joseph Pennington (MP); Christopher Pickering	Member of Parliament for Cumberland; 1601–1604; With: Gerard Lowther	Succeeded by Wilfrid Lawson; Edward Musgrave
