= Patricius Curwen =

English landowner and politician

Sir Patricius Curwen, 1st Baronet (c. 1602 – 15 December 1664) of Workington Hall, Cumberland was an English landowner and politician who sat in the House of Commons of England from 1640 to 1643 and from 1661 to 1664. He supported the Royalist side in the English Civil War.

== Biography ==
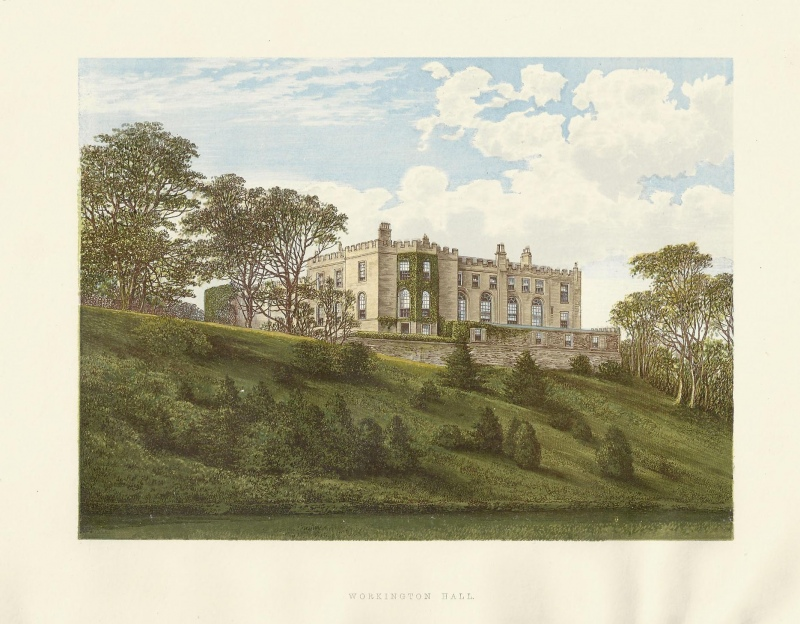
Workington Hall - seat of the Curwen family

Curwen was the son of Sir Henry Curwen of Workington in Cumberland. The Curwen family-owned iron ore mines at Harrington and the account books of Curwen's steward contain many references to iron ore. Curwen was apparently a generous landlord who between 1628 and 1643 paid his harvesters with food and wages and provided a piper to play in the fields for the time of the harvest. In 1627 he was created a baronet, of Workington in the County of Cumberland.

Curwen served as a Justice of the Peace for Cumberland from 1624 to at least 1640 and in 1636 was appointed High Sheriff of Cumberland. In April 1640 he was elected Member of Parliament for Cumberland for the Short Parliament and was re-elected in November 1640 for the Long Parliament. As a staunch Royalist he was one of the 56 MPs who voted to spare the life of the Earl of Strafford and was disabled from sitting in March 1643. When the Civil War started he enlisted as a colonel in the Royalist army. After the Restoration in 1661 Curwen was elected MP for Cumberland again in the Cavalier Parliament and held the seat until his death in 1664.

Curwen died in December 1664 at the age of 62 and was buried at Workington. He had married Lady Isabella Selby, daughter of Sir George Selby of Whitehouse in Durham but their only son Henry had died in 1636. Curwen's Workington estate therefore passed to his brother Thomas and the baronetcy became extinct. In his will he bequeathed money to build and maintain a school at Harrington which was known as the Patricius Curwen School.

Escutcheon of the Curwen baronets

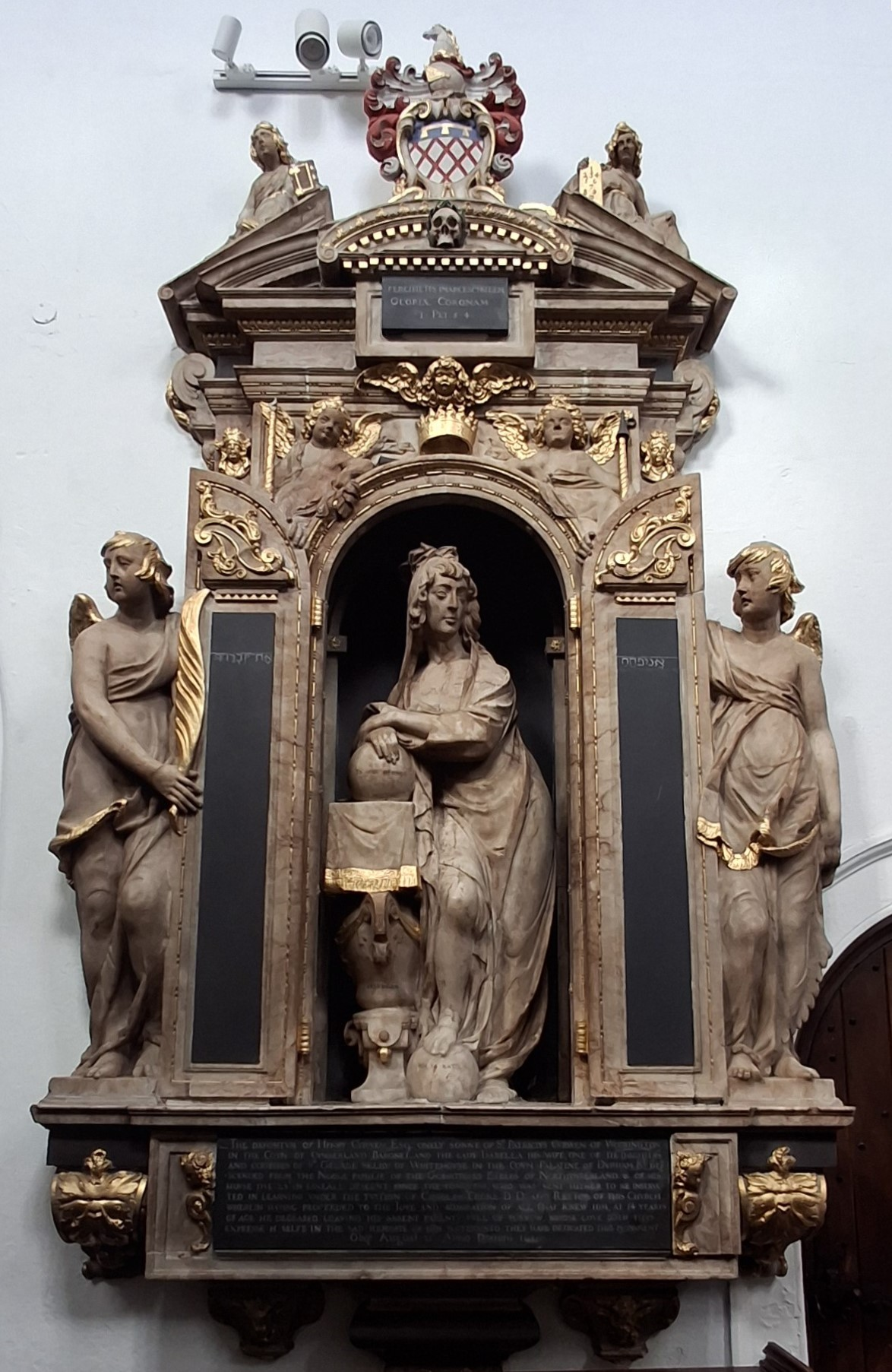
Henry Curwen Esq Only Son of Sir Patricivs Curwen of Workington

Henry Curwen was sent to Amersham to be taught by Charles Croke DD, the rector of St Mary the Virgin, Amersham, Buckinghamshire but the boy died at 14 years of age. His distraught parents paid for a memorial in the parish church and the text underneath gives this detail:

Henry Curwen (died 21 August 1636) was the only son of Sir Patricius Curwen, Baronet of Workington, Cumberland, and Lady Isabella, daughter of Sir George Selby of Whitehouse, Durham. The Curwen family traces their ancestry back to 23 generations to the Gospatrics, Earls of Northumberland. At the time of Curwens death at age 14, Henry was residing in the district of the church to receive an education under of Charles Croke, D.D., which was the local rector. This monument was ordered to formed by his parents to mark his place of burial following his death in August 1636.

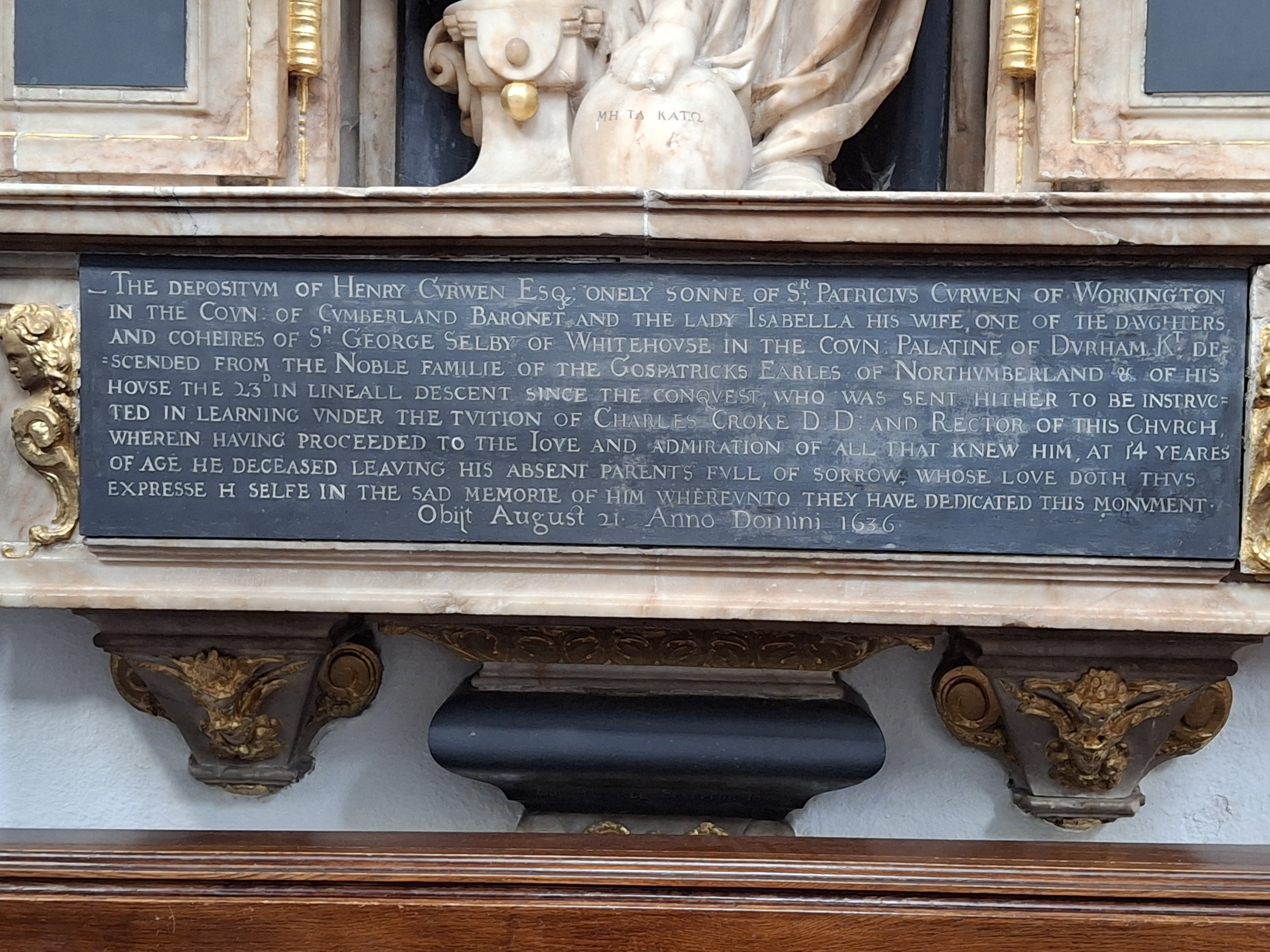
Henry Curwen’s memorial text

Parliament of England
Vacant Parliament suspended since 1629	Member of Parliament for Cumberland; 1640–1643; With: Sir George Dalston	Succeeded by William Armine; Richard Tolson
Preceded by Sir Wilfrid Lawson; Charles Howard	Member of Parliament for Cumberland; 1661–1664; With: Sir George Fletcher, 2nd Baronet	Succeeded by Sir George Fletcher, 2nd Baronet; Sir John Lowther, 2nd Baronet
Baronetage of England
New creation	Baronet (of Workington); 1627–1664	Extinct
