= Henry Curwen (died 1623) =

English politician

Sir Henry Curwen (c. 1581 – 23 October 1623) was an English politician who sat in the House of Commons from 1621 to 1622.

Curwen was the only son of Sir Nicholas Curwen of Workington, Cumberland and his first wife Ann Musgrave. He matriculated at Pembroke College, Cambridge in about 1595. He succeeded his father in 1605, by which time he had been knighted.

== Biography ==
He served as a justice of the peace for Cumberland from 1617 until his death and was appointed High Sheriff of Cumberland for 1619–20. In 1621, he was elected member of parliament for Cumberland.

He married firstly Catherine Dalston, daughter of Sir John Dalston of Dalston, Cumberland, and secondly Margaret Bruskill, daughter of Thomas Bruskill, counsellor of Heversham, Westmorland. His son Patricius was later MP for Cumberland.

Curwen's half sister Marie married Sir Henry Widdrington: their son William became the first Baron Widdrington.

Curwen died in 1624. He is buried in Amersham with a memorial sculpted by Edward Marshall.

Parliament of England
Preceded by Sir Thomas Penruddock; Sir William Lawson	Member of Parliament for Cumberland; 1621; With: Sir George Dalston	Succeeded by Sir George Dalston; Ferdinando Huddleston
