= Simon Musgrave =

English landowner, High Sheriff of Cumberland and Member of Parliament

Simon Musgrave of Hartley and Edenhall (died 1597) was an English landowner, High Sheriff of Cumberland, and Member of Parliament for Cumberland in 1572.

He was a younger son of Edward Musgrave of Hartley and his wife Joan, a daughter of Sir Christopher Ward of Givendale. He inherited the family estates of his nephew Richard Musgrave in 1555.

He married Julian, a daughter of William Ellerker of Ellerker.

Simon Musgrave was constable of Bewcastle Castle. He made his sons depute or Captain of Bewcastle, including Thomas Musgrave. He entertained the Scottish rebel Francis Stewart, 5th Earl of Bothwell at Edenhall in 1593. He died at Edenhall in January 1597.

His children included:

- Christopher Musgrave, who married Joan Curwen, a daughter of Sir Henry Curwen of Workington. Their son, Richard Musgrave, inherited his grandfather's estates.
- Richard Musgrave
- Thomas Musgrave
