= Thomas Curwen =

Thomas Curwen (1415–1486/1487) was a 15th-century sheriff of Cumberland. He was son of William Curwen and Elizabeth, daughter of John Huddleston of Millom Castle. He held numerous offices around the region, including elector of the county (at which election he himself was elected), escheator and on various commissions. He was knighted in 1449. He was a supporter of Henry Percy, 2nd Earl of Northumberland in Westmorland in the 1450s during the Percy–Neville feud, although he made his peace when the Yorkist Edward IV took the throne in 1461. When Edward's brother Richard took the throne in 1483, Curwen was appointed to each of his Cumberland commissions, although, as the parliamentary historian Josiah Wedgwood notes, "he must have been a very old man".
