= Fletcher baronets of Hutton le Forest (1641) =

Escutcheon of the Fletcher baronets of Hutton le Forest

The Fletcher baronetcy of Hutton le Forest (Hutton in the Forest, near Skelton), Cumberland was created on 19 February 1641 for Henry Fletcher. He served two terms as High Sheriff of Cumberland 1641–1643, raised a regiment for the Royalist forces of the First English Civil War, and was killed at the Battle of Rowton Heath in 1645. The baronetcy was extinct on the death of the 3rd Baronet in 1712.

== Fletcher baronets of Hutton le Forest (1641) ==
- Sir Henry Fletcher, 1st Baronet (died 1645)
- Sir George Fletcher, 2nd Baronet (1633–1700)
- Sir Henry Fletcher, 3rd Baronet (1661–1712)
