= Listed buildings in Workington =

Workington is a civil parish and a town in the Cumberland unitary authority area of Cumbria, England. It contains 58 listed buildings that are recorded in the National Heritage List for England. Of these, one is listed at Grade I, the highest of the three grades, seven are at Grade II*, the middle grade, and the others are at Grade II, the lowest grade. Workington is a port, and its industries in the past have been based on coal mining and steel making. There is a great variety in types of listed buildings. Most of them are houses and associated structures and shops. They also include churches, a fortified house now a ruin, a museum and theatre, public houses, hotels, clubs, a school, a bridge, memorials, and a model farm. There are also remaining industrial buildings.

== Key ==
Grade	Criteria
I	Buildings of exceptional interest, sometimes considered to be internationally important
II*	Particularly important buildings of more than special interest
II	Buildings of national importance and special interest

== Buildings ==
Name and location	Photograph	Date	Notes	Grade
St Michael's Church; 54.64544°N 3.55398°W		12th century	The oldest surviving part of the church is the Norman tower. The rest of the church and the upper part of the tower were rebuilt in 1770–72. The church was damaged by fire in 1887 and again in 1994, and the interior was remodelled on both occasions. It is built in calciferous sandstone and pink sandstone, and has a green slate roof with coped gables and cross finials. The church consists of a nave with aisles, a short chancel, a polygonal north vestry, and a west tower. The tower has a west doorway, a clock face on the west side, and a battlemented parapet with crocketed pinnacles. There are also battlemented parapets and crocketed pinnacles on the aisles.	II*
Workington Hall; 54.64457°N 3.53915°W		Mid 14th century	A fortified tower house, now in ruins. Alterations and additions were made in the 15th and 16th centuries, followed by further alterations in 1783–89 by John Carr. It is built in calciferous sandstone and red sandstone, and is without a roof. Its features include a three-storey tower, a two-storey hall range, a three-storey garderobe turret, a canted bay window, a kitchen range with an angle turret, and a gatehouse, all enclosing a courtyard. The tower contains loops, a spiral staircase, and walls with murals.	I
St Michael's House; 54.64576°N 3.55415°W	—	15th century	Originally a rectory, the house has been extended in the 19th and 20th centuries, and used as a residential home. It has the plan of a hall with cross wings, it has thick roughcast walls and a green slate roof. There are two storeys, and a central recessed block with two bays flanked by gabled wings. The doorway has a pointed chamfered arch with a hood mould, and the windows are mullioned with moulded sills and hood moulds. The chimney stacks on the sides are large and stepped. Inside the house is a blocked inglenook.	II*
Stainburn Old Hall; 54.64931°N 3.51656°W	—	Early 17th century	A roughcast house that has a slate roof with coped gables. There are three storeys and three bays. On the front is a gabled porch and a doorway that has a chamfered surround and an oval fanlight, both with hood moulds. The windows are cross-mullioned with hood moulds, and those in the top floor are blocked.	II
Brooklands; 54.61359°N 3.55525°W	—	Late 17th century	A roughcast house that has a green slate roof with coped gables and ball finials. There are two storeys and five double-span bays. The doorway has a pediment, and the windows are casements in stone surrounds. On the right side is an external stepped chimney stack.	II
Gate piers and wall, Brooklands; 54.61353°N 3.55541°W	—	Late 17th century	The wall encloses one side of the front garden. It is a low rubble wall with flat coping. There are two square ashlar piers that have broad caps and ball finials.	II
Joseph Thompson Headstone; 54.61850°N 3.53500°W	—	1745	The headstone from a grave, in calciferous sandstone and consisting of an inscribed slab with a rounded top. Joseph Thompson was buried at his request on Scaw Moor, and when this was enclosed, the headstone was moved to its present site.	II
Willow Dene and former stables 54.61651°N 3.55956°W	—	Mid 18th century	Originally a rectory, it is a rendered private house with a green slate roof. The house has two storeys and four bays, with a rear extension and L-shaped former stables, giving a U-shaped plan. There are two doorways in stone surrounds, one with a fanlight, and the windows are sashes also in stone surrounds. In the former stables are a blocked carriage archway and casement windows.	II
1 Christian Street; 54.64276°N 3.54110°W	—	Late 18th century	A roughcast house on corner site, it has a moulded plinth and a green slate roof. There are two storeys, three bays, a doorway with a radial fanlight and a pediment on console brackets, and sash windows in stone surrounds.	II
11 Christian Street; 54.64303°N 3.54098°W	—	Late 18th century	A roughcast house with a green slate roof in two storeys and three bays. It has a doorway with a radial fanlight and a pediment on console brackets, and sash windows in stone surrounds.	II
11 and 13 Curwen Street and cottage 54.64288°N 3.54190°W	—	Late 18th century	Originally two houses with a cottage or workshop at the rear. The main part is rendered on a moulded plinth, with quoins, an eaves cornice, and a green slate roof with coped gables. There are three storeys, five bays, and an extension at the rear. In the centre is a through archway with a fanlight containing intersecting tracery, and a quoined surround. The windows are sashes in architraves, and at the rear are Tuscan doorcases. The building at the rear has one storey and two bays, it is roughcast and has a battlemented parapet and a hipped roof.	II
15 Curwen Street; 54.64299°N 3.54181°W	—	Late 18th century	A roughcast house that has a green slate roof with a coped gable. There are two storeys and three bays, with a recessed bay to the left. The doorway has pilasters, a pediment, and a radial fanlight. The windows in the ground floor are sashes, and in the upper floor they are replacement casements, all in plain reveals. In the left bay is a doorway in a stone surround and a casement window.	II
15A, 17 and 19 Portland Square; 54.64240°N 3.54015°W	—	Late 18th century	A row of three stuccoed houses with quoins. No 15A has a tiled roof, and the other roofs are in green slate. There are two storeys, No. 17 has one bay, and the other houses have two bays each. The doorways and sash windows have stone surrounds, and on the front of No. 15A is a sundial dated 1777.	II
21 Portland Square; 54.64236°N 3.54003°W	—	Late 18th century	A stuccoed house with angle pilasters, an eaves cornice, and a green slate roof. There are two storeys with cellars and an attic, and three bays with a further recessed bay to the right. The doorway has panelled reveals and a fanlight, and the sash windows have stone surrounds. In the left return is a round attic window.	II
10 Portland Street; 54.64246°N 3.54136°W	—	Late 18th century	A stuccoed house with a green slate roof, it has two storeys with an attic, and three bays. The doorway and sash windows have stone surrounds.	II
Cross House; 54.60893°N 3.55426°W	—	Late 18th century	The house was extended in the early 19th century. It is rendered with angle pilasters, an eaves cornice, and a green slate roof with coped gables. There are two storeys and three bays, with a higher single-bay extension to the right. The doorway and sash windows have stone surrounds.	II
Curwen and Co. Solicitors; 54.64257°N 3.54122°W	—	Late 18th century	A house later used as an office in Portland Square, it is roughcast with a green slate roof. There are two storeys with attics, and four bays. The doorway and sash windows have stone surrounds, there is a blocked doorway with a segmental head, and at the rear is a bowed staircase window.	II
Helena Thompson Museum and former stables 54.64238°N 3.53743°W	—	Late 18th century	Originally a house with stables, later used as a museum, it is rendered on a chamfered plinth, with quoins, a dentilled cornice, and a green slate roof with coped gables. There are two storeys and five bays, a two-storey, two-bay right wing, and former stables at right angles behind this, giving an L-shaped plan. The doorway has fluted pilasters, panelled reveals, a dentilled pediment and a fanlight with intersecting tracery. The windows are sashes in architraves, and on the sides are Venetian windows.	II
Seaton Mill Farmhouse, 3 and 4 Seaton Mill Cottages and barn 54.65185°N 3.51964°W	—	Late 18th century	Originally a farmhouse, it has been divided into a house and two cottages, and there is a barn at right angles to the rear. The house and cottages are stuccoed on a moulded plinth, and have angle pilasters, an eaves cornice, and a green slate roof with coped gables. There are two storeys, two double-span bays, and doors and sash windows in stone surrounds. The barn is in calciferous sandstone with a corrugated asbestos roof, and has a segmental cart entrance, flanking doorways, a loft doorway and ventilation slits.	II
Viaduct Hotel; 54.64540°N 3.55723°W	—	Late 18th century	The hotel was extended in the early 19th century, it is roughcast on a chamfered plinth, and has quoins, an eaves cornice, and a tile roof. There are three storeys and three bays, with a single-bay extension to the left, and a two-storey extension to the rear, giving an L-shaped plan. The doorway in the left return has a moulded doorcase with a radial fanlight. The windows on the front are sashes in architraves, and in the extension there is a mix of sash and casement windows.	II
Gate piers, Workington Hall; 54.64286°N 3.53768°W	—	Late 18th century	The gate piers are in calciferous sandstone ashlar. They are square, and are surmounted by carved unicorn heads.	II
Workington Veterans Club; 54.64283°N 3.54074°W	—	1798	Originally a house, later used as a club, the building is stuccoed, with angle pilasters, a string course, an eaves cornice, and a green slate roof. It has three storeys, three bays, double doors with a fanlight under a segmental arch, and sash windows with stone surrounds.	II
7 and 9 Curwen Street; 54.64281°N 3.54197°W	—	Late 18th or early 19th century	A pair of rendered houses with quoins, an eaves cornice, and a roof partly tiled, partly in green slate, with a coped gable. There are three storeys, No. 9 has two bays, No. 7 has three bays and a single-bay extension to the left containing a through arch. The doorways and sash windows have stone surrounds, and above the door of No. 7 is a fanlight.	II
1 and 3 Market Place; 54.64238°N 3.54205°W	—	Late 18th or early 19th century	A pair of houses divided into flats, roughcast on a stone plinth, with angle pilasters and a green slate roof with coped gables. They gave three storeys, one house has two bays and the other has three. The doorway, with a fanlight, and the sash windows have stone surrounds.	II
Green Dragon Hotel; 54.64239°N 3.54117°W	—	Late 18th or early 19th century	A stuccoed hotel on a moulded plinth, with angle pilasters and a green slate roof. The left part of the hotel has three storeys and three bays, and the right part has two storeys and four bays, all under a common roof. The doorway has a pilastered doorcase, a frieze with urns, and a fanlight. The windows are sashes, and on the right part are dormer windows.	II
Joseph Pirt and Co Engineering Works; 54.64613°N 3.55659°W		Late 18th or early 19th century	Originally an iron foundry, the building is in calciferous sandstone with quoins, and a green slate roof with coped gables. It has three storeys and two bays, with a two-storey, two-bay extension. There is a central projecting square chimney in calciferous sandstone at the base, and stepped in brick in the upper parts. The windows have arched heads.	II
Schoose Farmhouse and barns 54.63758°N 3.52870°W	—	c. 1800	The buildings originated as stables for a model farm. The farmhouse is roughcast with a tile roof, and has two storeys, three bays, and a door and windows in stone surrounds. The barns are in calciferous sandstone and cobble, and have roofs partly of green slate, and partly of corrugated asbestos, and with the farmhouse form a U-shaped plan. The openings, some of which are blocked, include a segmental archway, doorways, loft doors, ventilation slits, and windows in stone surrounds. There are the remains of an external stone staircase.	II*
Granary, Schoose Farm; 54.63755°N 3.52780°W	—	c. 1800	The granary was part of a model farm. It is in calciferous sandstone with quoins and a green slate roof. There are three storeys and nine bays. At the left end is a single-storey one-bay extension. Features include stone steps leading to loft doors on two levels, segmental-headed doorways converted into windows, louvred windows, and a cart doorway.	II*
Windmill, barns, gatehouse and curtain wall, Schoose Farm; 54.63721°N 3.52876°W	—	c. 1800	The buildings form part of a model farm. They are in calciferous sandstone with roofs mainly of corrugated asbestos and some slate. The buildings consist of a five-storey windmill, a two-storey barn with single-storey extensions, and other farm buildings linked by a mock curtain wall containing a mock gatehouse with a segmental archway, all forming three sides of a courtyard. Features of the buildings include quoins, angle pilasters, and battlemented parapets. The floors and sails have been removed from the windmill.	II*
Storeroom; 54.64162°N 3.54334°W	—	1805	Originally a lock-up and later used for other purposes, it is in calciferous sandstone, and has a barrel vaulted roof. There is one storey and two bays. On the front are two doorways, one blocked, and there is another doorway on the left return. There are ventilation slits in both returns.	II
St John's Church; 54.64173°N 3.54436°W		1822–23	A Commissioners' church designed by Thomas Hardwick, it is built in calciferous sandstone with green slate roofs. The church consists of a nave with a vestry and no chancel. At the west end is a Tuscan portico with four columns, and a tower. The tower has a square base, above which it becomes octagonal with pairs of pilasters, and it has a round cap. Inside the church there are galleries on three sides carried on thin fluted cast iron columns. A community hall was added to the east in 1881.	II*
28 and 30 Curwen Street; 54.64317°N 3.54124°W	—	Early 19th century	A pair of houses; No. 28 is stuccoed and No. 30 is roughcast with angle pilasters. Both houses have an eaves cornice and a green slate roof. They have two storeys and each house has three bays. The doorways have pilastered doorcases and radial fanlights, and the windows are sashes with stone surrounds.	II
3 Jane Street; 54.64226°N 3.54256°W	—	Early 19th century	A house and a shop on a corner site with Nook Street, roughcast with a green slate roof. There are two storeys with attics, and each building has two bays. The house, on Jane Street, has a doorway with a fanlight, and sash windows, all in stone surrounds. The shop has a corner doorway with a fanlight, and on each side are shop bow windows in moulded wooden surrounds. The other windows are sashes, and there is a loading door in Jane Street.	II
18 Portland Square and 2 Cavendish Street; 54.64214°N 3.54042°W	—	Early 19th century	A pair of stuccoed houses on a corner site, with quoins and green slate roofs with a coped gable. They have two storeys with attics, and each house has three bays. The doorways and sash windows have stone surrounds, the doors have fanlights, and the doorway of No. 2 Cavendish Street has a pediment.	II
1 Portland Street, shops and wall 54.64272°N 3.54174°W	—	Early 19th century	A house, with two shops facing Curwen Street, all stuccoed. The house has an eaves cornice, quoins, and a green slate roof with coped gables. They are all in two storeys, the house has three bays and an extension wall to the right. It has a doorway in an architrave with a pediment on console brackets, and a fanlight. The windows are sashes with stone surrounds. The shops have shop fronts and doors with pilastered surrounds.	II
East Lodge; 54.64433°N 3.53004°W	—	Early 19th century	A lodge for Workington Hall, it is pebbledashed with string courses, angle pilasters, and a green slate roof. It has a two-storey, two-bay central part, with flanking single-storey, single-bay wings. The porch contains a pointed fanlight, and the windows are lancets. In the gable is a quatrefoil.	II
Elmbank; 54.63745°N 3.53718°W	—	Early 19th century	A house, later divided into two dwellings, stuccoed with a green slate roof. There are two storeys and five bays, with a single-storey extension at the rear. It has a polygonal pilastered porch, and sash windows in plain reveals.	II
Byres, Schoose Farm; 54.63785°N 3.52827°W	—	Early 19th century	The farm buildings were part of a model farm. They are in calciferous sandstone with pilastered quoins and a hipped green slate roof. There are two storeys and eight bays. The buildings contain doorways with quoined surrounds, casement windows with plain stone surrounds, and loft doors.	II*
The Old Mill; 54.65180°N 3.51972°W	—	Early 19th century	A house in calciferous sandstone with quoins and a Welsh slate roof with coped gables. It has two storeys, two bays, a plank door with a stone surround and a bracketed hood, and sash windows with stone surrounds and false keystones.	II
The Priory; 54.63890°N 3.54352°W	—	Early 19th century	A priest's house, roughcast, with angle pilasters and a green slate roof. It has two storeys, six bays, a door with a radial fanlight, and sash windows, all in stone surrounds. There is also a tall round-headed window.	II
Trades Hall; 54.64557°N 3.54794°W	—	Early 19th century	A social club, stuccoed on a chamfered plinth, with angle pilasters and an eaves cornice, and a green slate roof with coped gables. It has two storeys and five bays, with later extensions at the rear, and a lower two-storey five-bay wing to the left. The doorway has a pilastered surround with a false keystone and a radial fanlight, and the windows are sashes in stone surrounds. At the rear of the extension are blind windows with imposts, and doors and windows with carved-head keystones.	II
United Club; 54.64222°N 3.54066°W	—	Early 19th century	Originally a house, the building is in rusticated ashlar on a chamfered plinth, with a string course, quoins, a modillioned eaves cornice, and a green slate roof . There are two storeys and three bays. The doorway has a pilastered doorcase and a fanlight with intersecting tracery, and the windows are sashes in stone surrounds.	II
Workington Bridge; 54.64701°N 3.53921°W		1841	The bridge carries the A596 road over the River Derwent. It is in calciferous sandstone and consists of three segmental arches with rusticated voussoirs carried on two round-ended piers. The bridge has a solid parapet with chamfered coping and three pairs of pilasters. The stones in the centres of the parapets are inscribed.	II
Chimney, Jane Pit; 54.63514°N 3.55843°W	—	1843	The chimney was built for a coal mine, now disused. It is in calciferous sandstone, and consists of a round chimney on a square base with round brick arches. The chimney has a battlemented parapet below its neck.	II
Engine house, Jane Pit; 54.63508°N 3.55813°W	—	1843	The engine house is in calciferous sandstone and red sandstone on a rectangular plinth, and has a battlemented parapet, a bracketed cornice, a three-storey two-bay oval tower and a higher circular chimney. The doorways and windows are in architraves, and the chimney has brick-arched stoke holes at the base, and a battlemented parapet below its neck.	II
Lamp post 54.64254°N 3.54108°W	—	Victorian	The lamp post in Portland Square is in cast iron. It has a column decorated with fluting and leaves, and there are ladder brackets.	II
52 Finkle Street; 54.64514°N 3.54850°W	—	Mid 19th century	Originally the lodge to Trades Hall, later used for other purposes, it is in stone on a moulded plinth, with angle pilasters, an eaves cornice, a string course, a parapet, and a hipped green slate roof. The building is in a single storey and has two bays. The windows are sashes with segmental-arched surrounds containing carved keystones. In the left return is a round-arched doorway with a pilastered surround and a carved keystone.	II
Tower and Maltings, Workington Brewery; 54.64450°N 3.54410°W	—	Mid 19th century	The tower and the adjoining maltings are rendered. The tower has six storeys and two bays, it has a battlemented parapet, and a hipped slate roof, and there is a battlemented chimney stack. In the centre of each storey is a boarded doorway, and in the top storey is a wooden hoist house; these are flanked by windows with quoined surrounds. The maltings has three storeys, and four bays to the left and two to the right; it contains windows similar to those in the tower. The building has been converted into flats.	II
8 Portland Street; 54.64253°N 3.54152°W	—	1861	A shop at the entrance to the covered market, it is in ashlar on a chamfered plinth, with rusticated pilasters, a bracketed cornice, and a hipped green slate roof. There are two storeys, two bays, and a rounded shop door with a pilastered doorcase and a fanlight. There is a double round-headed shop window, and in the upper floor are casement windows.	II
Warehouse, Workington Brewery; 54.64471°N 3.54396°W	—	1866	The warehouse is stuccoed with a hipped green slate roof on which are two lead-domed cupolas surmounted by weathervanes. There are two storeys and four bays. The warehouse contains a blocked segmental archway, and in the upper floor are a loft door and a window with stone surrounds and false keystones.	II
Harrington Infant School; 54.61491°N 3.56312°W	—	1875	The school is in red sandstone on a chamfered plinth with detailing in buff sandstone, and with Welsh slate roofs and clay ridge tiles. It has an E-shaped plan with three gabled wings, and is in a single storey. There are two ached entrances in the angles of the outer wings. The windows are 20th-century casements in the original stone surrounds.	II
Church of Our Lady and St Michael; 54.63951°N 3.54301°W	—	1876	A Roman Catholic church by E. W. Pugin, built in St Bees sandstone with a Westmorland slate roof. It consists of a nave with a baptistry, aisles, transepts, an organ gallery, a vestry, and a chancel with chapels. The south front is gabled with a gabled bellcote, and it contains a double doorway, and niches containing statues. The interior, furniture and fittings are elaborately decorated. The steps, walls, gates and gate piers are included in the listing.	II
Peat Memorial Obelisk; 54.64237°N 3.54059°W	—	1881	The memorial commemorates a local physician, and is in polished Dalbeattie granite. It is 23 feet (7.0 m) high and consists of an obelisk 13 feet (4.0 m) high on a tapered pedestal standing on a stepped base. At the base are inscribed quotations in English and in Latin. The memorial is surrounded by railings.	II
St Mary's Church; 54.61637°N 3.55903°W		1885	The tower was added in 1905–07. The church is built in pink St Bees sandstone with dressings in calciferous sandstone and in red sandstone, and it has a Welsh slate roof with coped gables and a cross finial. It consists of a nave, a chancel with a north vestry, and a west tower. The tower has three stages, it incorporates a porch, and has Tudor-style windows and bell openings. At the top is a corbelled battlemented parapet. The windows contain Y-tracery.	II
Carnegie Arts Centre and Theatre; 54.64491°N 3.54808°W	—	1904	Originally a Carnegie library, it has been converted into an arts centre and theatre. It is built in calciferous sandstone on a red sandstone plinth, and has red sandstone quoins, an eaves cornice with modillions, and a green slate roof. There is a two-storey, seven-bay central block, flanked by single-storey four-bay wings, and a two-storey theatre at the left forming an L-shaped plan. The central bay contains a doorway in an architrave with a hood mould on consoles, and at the top is a segmental pediment with a Latin inscription. The windows are sashes in architraves, those in the lower floor of the central block having arched heads and false keystones.	II
Bethwaites Printers; 54.64211°N 3.54235°W	—	Early 20th century	Originally a bank, later used for other purposes, it is in rusticated calciferous sandstone on a red sandstone plinth. The building has eaves modillions, an open baluster parapet, a hipped slate roof, and a lead cupola. It has a single storey and three bays. The doorway has a round-headed architrave, a fanlight, and a false keystone. The windows are round-headed with rusticated surrounds and false keystones.	II
Wyrehurst; 54.61290°N 3.56421°W	—	Early 20th century	A stuccoed house in a terrace on a chamfered plinth, with a string course, angle pilasters, a modillioned eaves, and a green slate roof. There are two storeys with attics, and two bays. The doorway has pilasters, a pediment, and a fanlight containing Art Nouveau stained glass. There is a smaller passage doorway, also with a pediment. Between them is a two-storey bay window, and above the door is a two-light windows, all with stained glass in the upper panels. In the roof are two dormers with pilasters and pediments.	II
War Memorial Cenotaph; 54.64167°N 3.55169°W		1928	The war memorial consists of a cenotaph in Shap granite that was designed by Robert Lorimer. It is about 30 feet (9.1 m) high and stands on a stepped base. On each side is an alcove, round-headed on two sides and circular on the other. The alcoves contain bronze panels depicting soldiers on two sides and the town's industries on the other sides. Above the alcoves are carvings, and above these the cenotaph reduces in size and is surmounted by a granite lamp.	II
