= Richard Musgrave (died 1555) =

English politician

Sir Richard Musgrave (1524–1555) was an English politician.

He was the only son of Sir William Musgrave of Hartley and Edenhall and his wife Jane, a daughter of Sir Thomas Curwen. He succeeded to the family estates in 1544. He was knighted by August 1552.

He was justice of the peace for Cumberland from 1547 to his death and was appointed High Sheriff of Cumberland for 1554–55. He was Captain of Carlisle Castle, Cumberland in November 1552 and from December 1553 to February 1554. He was elected a member (MP) of the Parliament of England for Cumberland in 1547 and March 1553.

He married Anne or Agnes Wharton, the daughter of Thomas Wharton, 1st Baron Wharton. Their children included:

- Thomas Musgrave, who died aged 13 in 1565
- Eleanor Musgrave (1546–1623), who married the diplomat Robert Bowes

Richard Musgrave died at Edenhall in 1555. He was succeeded in his estates by his uncle, Simon Musgrave. His widow married Humphrey Musgrave of Hayton Castle in Cumbria.
