= St John's Church, Workington =

Coordinates: 54.6417°N 3.5443°W

St John's Church
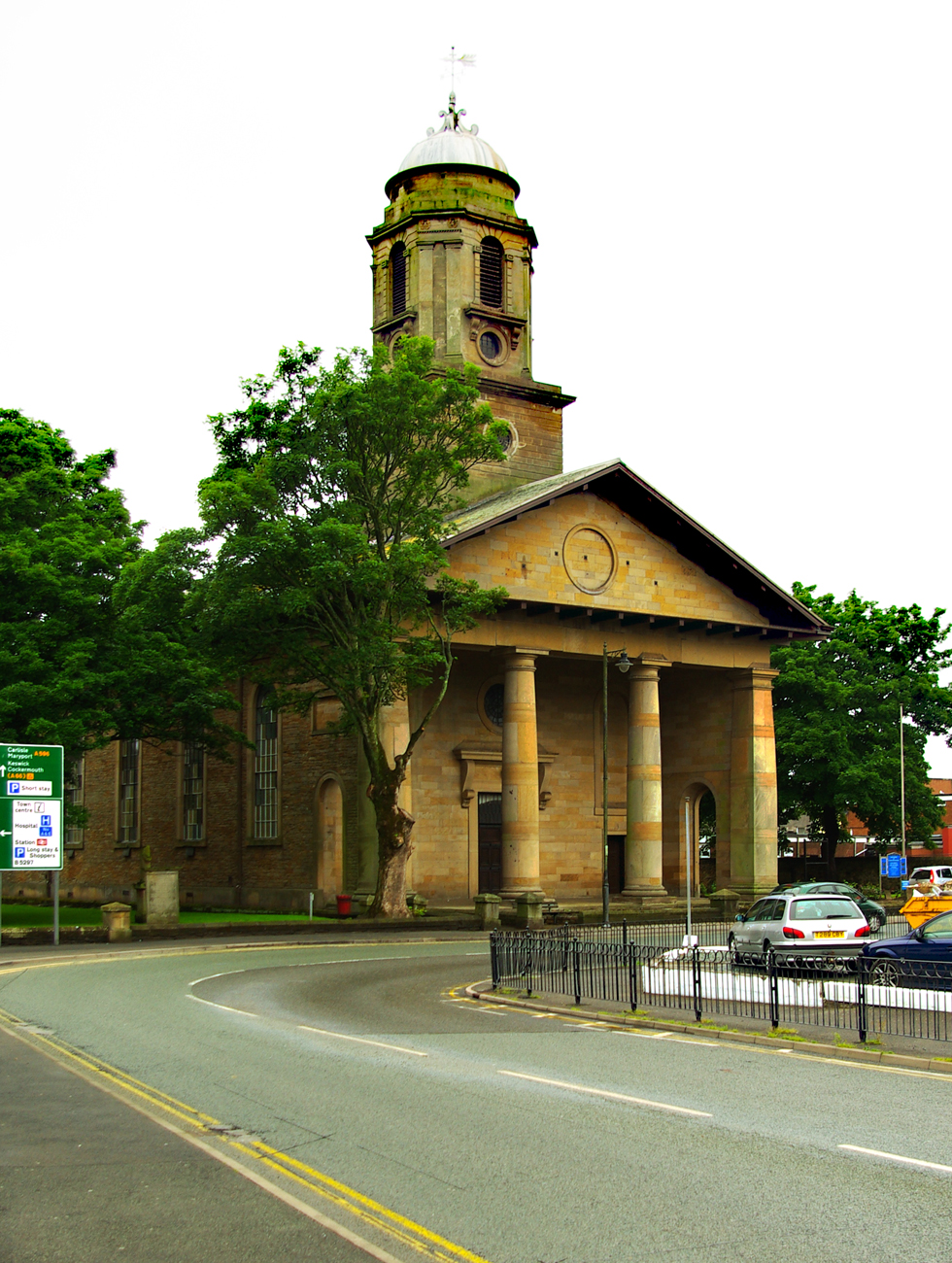

- Location in Allerdale, Cumbria Location in Cumbria, England
- OS grid reference: NY 004 285
- Location: Washington Street, Workington, Cumbria
- Country: England
- Denomination: Anglican
- Churchmanship: Liberal Catholic
- Website: https://workingtonbenefice.org.uk

History
- Status: Parish church

Architecture
- Functional status: Active
- Heritage designation: Grade II*
- Designated: 6 June 1951
- Architect(s): Thomas Hardwick; W. and C. A. Bassett-Smith; Ninian Comper
- Architectural type: Church
- Style: Neoclassical

Specifications
- Materials: Calciferous sandstone Green slate roof

Administration
- Province: York
- Diocese: Carlisle
- Archdeaconry: West Cumberland
- Deanery: Solway
- Parish: St John, Workington

Clergy
- Rector: The Reverend Ben Thompson SMMS

St John's Church is in Washington Street, Workington, Cumbria, England. It is an active Anglican parish church in the deanery of Solway, the archdeaconry of West Cumberland, and the diocese of Carlisle. The church is recorded in the National Heritage List for England as a designated Grade II* listed building. It is a Commissioners' church, having received a grant towards its construction from the Church Building Commission.

== History ==
St John's was built between 1822 and 1823, and was designed by Thomas Hardwick, originally as a chapel of ease. A grant of £10,488 (equivalent to £1,080,000 as of 2025) was given towards its construction by the Church Building Commission. The tower, originally built in wood, was rebuilt in stone in 1847 by Nelson of Carlisle. The altar was originally at the west end, and the church was re-orientated in 1897–99 by W. and C. A. Bassett-Smith, placing the altar at the east end. In 1930–31 this was reverted to its original position by Ninian Comper.

== Architecture ==
=== Exterior ===
The church is constructed in hammer-dressed calciferous sandstone with an ashlar plinth, pilasters and eaves. The roof is in green slate. Its architectural style is Neoclassical, and the design is based on that of St Paul's, Covent Garden. The tower and portico are at the east end. The tower is square at the base, then becomes octagonal, with pairs of pilasters, and has a round cap at the top. The portico is supported by two large columns. Along the sides of the church are tall round-headed windows.

=== Interior ===
The interior of the church is in five bays. There is no chancel. There are galleries on three sides of the church, supported on thin fluted cast iron columns. The plaster ceiling is flat, and is decorated with ribbing and coats of arms. At the west end is a completely gilded Italianate baldacchino. This was designed by Comper, as were the cover of the font, the stained glass in the east window, and the organ case, which is in Ionic style. The two manual organ was built in 1905 by Richard Heslop, and was rebuilt in 1961 by Rushworth and Dreaper.

== See also ==
- Listed buildings in Workington
- List of Commissioners' churches in Northeast and Northwest England
