= Christopher Curwen (MP) =

15th-century English politician

Christopher Curwen (died 1450) was an English soldier, administrator and politician. He was the son of Sir William Curwen of Workington, Cumberland and his first wife, Alice. He succeeded his father in 1403 and was knighted by 1404.

He was a member (MP) of the parliament of England for Appleby in September 1397, for Cumberland in November 1414, 1423, 1425, 1427, 1431 and 1432.

He was appointed High Sheriff of Cumberland for 1415–16, 1423–24, 1427–28, 1433–34, 1437–38 and 1444–45. He was also a Justice of the Peace for Cumberland from 1435 to 1439 and from 1443 to 1448.

From 1417 he saw military service under John, Lord Neville, in Henry V's second expedition against the French, as leader of 44 lances and 113 archers. He was made keeper of the castle of Danville in Normandy and in 1419 he and his male heirs were granted in perpetuity the castle of Cany-en-Caux and the lordship of Caux, which had been confiscated from the Duke of Bavaria.

== Death ==
Curwen married Elizabeth, the daughter of Sir John Huddlestone of Millom Castle; they had two sons. He died in 1450 and was buried at Workington church. Three Children:

- 1. Sir Thomas Curwen, "The Sherriff of Cumberland" (1408–1473) married Anne Lowther, daughter of Robert Lowther, of Lowther MP
- 2. William Curwen, Knight, (Abt. 1410 – Bef. 1450/53) Spent time fighting in Normandy. In 1434 was given 40 marks by his father, married Unknown, Had one daughter Elizabeth who married Sir John Mallory, Knight.
- 3. John Curwen, Governor of Porchester Castle (Abt. 1412–1441)

Christopher was succeeded by his eldest son, Thomas
