= Richard Tolson =

English lawyer and politician

Richard Tolson (1622–1689) was an English lawyer and politician who sat in the House of Commons from 1646 to 1648 and in 1660.

== Biography ==
Tolson was the son of Henry Tolson of Bridekirk in west Cumbria and his wife Margaret Savile, daughter of Henry Savile of Wath. He matriculated at Oriel College, Oxford on 17 October 1639, aged 17. He entered Lincoln's Inn in 1641 and also Gray's Inn in 1646.

In 1646, Tolson was elected member of parliament for Cumberland and sat until 1648 when he was secluded under Pride's Purge. He was called to the Bar in 1656.

In 1660, Tolson was elected MP for Cockermouth for the Convention Parliament. He was inactive in parliament. In 1667, he was High Sheriff of Cumberland.

Tolson was buried at Wath on 2 July 1689.

== Family ==
Tolson married Anne Gregory, daughter of Gilbert Gregory of Barnby-upon-Don, Yorkshire, in around 1650 and had five sons.

== Notes ==
Parliament of England
Preceded by Patricius Curwen; Sir George Dalston	Member of Parliament for Cumberland; 1646–1648; With: Sir William Armine, 2nd Baronet	Succeeded by Sir William Armine, 2nd Baronet
