= John Maxwell, 4th Lord Herries of Terregles =

Scottish nobleman and supporter of Mary, Queen of Scots

- Born: 1512?
- Died: 20 January 1583; Edinburgh
- Occupations: Nobleman and supporter of Mary, Queen of Scots

Sir John Maxwell, 4th Lord Herries of Terregles (1512? – 20 January 1583) was a Scottish nobleman and supporter of Mary, Queen of Scots.

== Biography ==
Maxwell was the second son of Robert, fifth lord Maxwell, by Janet Douglas, daughter of Sir William Douglas of Drumlanrig, Dumfriesshire. He was born about 1512, and was educated at Sweetheart Abbey, Kirkcudbrightshire. As tutor to his nephews, and presumptive heir to them and his brother, he was for some time known as the Master of Maxwell. While his father and brother were prisoners in England in 1545, he with great valour held Lochmaben Castle, and refused to deliver it up. In 1547 he married Agnes Herries, eldest daughter and coheiress with her two sisters of William, third lord Herries. To win her hand he had to enter into complicated intrigues against her guardian, the Earl of Arran, who designed to marry her to his son, Lord John Hamilton. Although related to her within the prohibited degrees, he neglected to obtain a papal dispensation for the marriage, but on 26 May 1555 an absolution and grace of dispensation was granted him.

On 20 March 1551-2 the Master of Maxwell was appointed to succeed his brother Robert, sixth lord Maxwell, as warden of the west marches. Regent Arran gave him £500 as a warden fee and £200 Scots to begin building a boundary dyke in the border "Debatable Lands". On 29 August 1553, Maxwell resigned the office of warden on the ground that he had come under deadly feud with various clans of the marches. It was therefore transferred to his uncle, James Douglas of Drumlanrig.

In 1559 the master was committed by the queen regent to the castle of Edinburgh for declaring that he would to the uttermost of his power 'assist the preachers and the congregation' (Knox, i. 319), but on 1 August he made his escape. On 15 August, John Knox advised Cecil to comfort him with "favourable writings", as his assistance would be invaluable to their cause. From this time Maxwell gave strenuous support to the reformed party. He was one of the commission who signed the treaty with Elizabeth at Berwick, 27 February 1560; he signed the band of 20 April following to defend the liberty of the Evangel, and for the expulsion of the French from Scotland; and on 27 January 1560-1 he subscribed the Book of Discipline.

After the return of Queen Mary to Scotland, Maxwell on 4 September 1561 was reappointed warden of the west marches (Reg. P. C. Scotl. i. 157). Henceforth his attitude towards the reformed party was uncertain; for while he continued nominally a Protestant, his political sympathies, like those of Secretary Maitland, were with the queen. He had been on terms of special friendship with Knox, who never lost respect for him, and refers to him as 'a man stout and wittie' (Works, i. 459), and as of 'great judgment and experience' (ib. ii. 351); but on account of a letter written by Knox in October 1563 in reference to the mass, the master gave Knox 'a discharge of the familiarity which before was great betwixt them' (ib. p. 399). Still the master did not break with James Stewart, 1st Earl of Moray even when he rose in rebellion at the time of the Darnley marriage in 1565, and endeavoured to prevent the queen going to extremities against him. When Moray retreated westwards from Edinburgh, the master had an interview with him at Hamilton, after which he endeavoured without success to mediate an arrangement with the queen. On Moray passing southwards into Dumfries he entertained him in his house (ib. p. 512); but when the queen expressed her determination to revenge herself on Moray, he declined to arrest him and advised him to pass into England. The queen on Moray's retirement committed to the master the charge of guarding the borders, and returned to Edinburgh (Herries, Memoirs, p. 72). On 1 January 1565-6 an act was also passed absolving him from all charges of treason that had been made against him (Reg. P. C. Scotl. i. 415). On the queen's escape from Holyrood Palace, after the murder of David Rizzio, the master joined her with a strong force at Dunbar, and henceforth may be reckoned one of her staunchest supporters.

At the end of 1566 he became Lord Herries. Sir James Balfour states that he was created Lord Herries at the baptism of Prince James, 17 December; but according to a decision of the House of Lords, 23 June 1858, no new peerage was created in his person, and he was merely called to the peerage in right of his wife. He also acquired from his wife's sisters their share in their father's estates, and on 8 May 1566 a charter of Terregles was granted to him and his wife and their heirs, and failing these to his heirs male. The charter was confirmed by parliament on 19 April 1567.

Herries was one of the assize who acquitted James Hepburn, 4th Earl of Bothwell of the murder of Henry Stuart, Lord Darnley, and excused himself for doing so merely on the ground that in the indictment the murder was stated wrongly to have been done on the 9th instead of on the morning of 10 February. He was, however, rather an enemy than a friend of Bothwell. Sir James Melville states that when rumours reached Herries of the queen's intention to marry Bothwell, he besought her on his knees to eschew "sic utter wrak and inconvenientis as that wuld bring on".

Herries signed the Ainslie Tavern Bond in April 1567, an agreement amongst the Scottish lords to support the marriage of Mary, Queen of Scots, and the Earl of Bothwell. Herries remained faithful to the queen when the marriage resulted in disaster to her. Although not present at Carberry, he subscribed the band at Dumbarton on her behalf; and such was the faith in his honesty and ability that the queen's lords entrusted to him the management of her cause, and advised Francis Throckmorton that communications from Elizabeth I in reference to means of aiding her should be sent to him. Throckmorton informed William Cecil that Herries was "the cunning horse-leech and the wisest of the whole faction; but, as the Queen of Scots says of him, there is nobody can be sure of him".

For a time Herries declined to have any conference with Moray so long as the queen was imprisoned, and he refused to permit the herald to proclaim the regency of Moray at Glasgow. On 14 October 1567 he came to Edinburgh and gave in his acknowledgment of the regent's authority, but, as would appear from the letter of the Bishop of St Andrews to him, the submission was merely nominal. At the meeting of parliament in December, he made a remarkable speech to the effect that those who, in view of the queen's refusal to give up Bothwell, had "sequestered" her in Lochleven had done the "duty of noble men", and that therefore Argyll, Huntly, and others, ought to give in their acknowledgment to the king's party, as he and others had done. Notwithstanding these specious professions he subscribed the band for the queen's deliverance from Lochleven, joined her standard immediately after her escape, and fought for her at Langside on 13 May 1568, where he had the command of the horse.

=== Queen Mary goes to England ===
It was to Herries that Mary entrusted herself when her cause was lost. When flight to Dumbarton was impossible, she sought refuge in his territories; but, probably in doubt also as to the strength of his loyalty, she finally decided, in opposition to his strong persuasions, to seek personally the assistance of Elizabeth. On 16 May Herries and the queen crossed the Solway into England. According to Claude Nau, Lord Herries was a friend of Henry Curwen of Workington Hall, where they first stayed. Mary wrote to Elizabeth I, from Workington mentioning Herries' help and his presence among her companions in England. On the 25th Herries was sent by Mary to Elizabeth I to solicit for her an interview that she might explain her position.

Herries is said to have carried a diamond ring from Cockermouth to Elizabeth in London, a ring which Elizabeth had previously given Mary as a token of friendship and promise of support. Herries and Lord Fleming were closely watched in London. The Spanish ambassador Diego Guzmán de Silva heard that Herries said to the Chancellor that Elizabeth ought to help Mary, according to a letter that Elizabeth recently had sent Mary with a token of a jewel. Elizabeth, however, declined to see Mary, or to interfere in her behalf, or to permit her to leave the country until she had cleared her reputation. Whether at the instance of Mary or not, Herries thereupon seems to have suggested a compromise. He told Sir Francis Knollys that he "misliked not" that Mary "should be bridled in her regiment by assistance of the noblemen of her realm in consideration of her rashness and foul marriage with the Earl of Bothwell", and Henry Middlemore was under the impression that Herries desired that the "regent with the noblemen should still bear rule, but under the direction of the Queen of England".

At a meeting of the estates on 19 August 1568 Herries was formally forfeited, but proceedings against him were suspended pending the result of the proposed conference in England. The regent also intended to have demolished his castle, but the laird of Drumlanrig having stated that it was the intention of Herries himself to pull it down and build a new one, the regent, scorning to be "a barrowman to his old walls", allowed it to stand. Herries was chosen by Mary one of her commissioners to the conferences in England, sharing the chief responsibility with the Bishop of Ross. On 1 December he made a vehement speech against the regent and the Scottish commissioners, affirming that some of them had themselves foreknowledge of the murder.

After Moray's return to Scotland in the spring of 1569, Herries joined the Hamiltons in an attempted revolt; and on coming to Edinburgh to arrange terms for an agreement he was on 16 April warded in the castle, on the ground that he had advised the Duke of Chatelherault not to take the oath to the regent. On 5 July he deemed it advisable to inform Elizabeth and William Cecil that he had not "dealt doubly in the cause of his mistress", nor had been "committed to ward with his own will". At the same time he gave 'good words' to the regent, who, however, distrusting his intentions, detained him in prison, and it was only after the regent's assassination that William Kirkcaldy of Grange set him free. There can scarcely be any doubt that he was at least indirectly concerned in Norfolk's conspiracy.

Shortly after obtaining his liberty, Herries joined the queen's lords at Linlithgow, when it was determined to assemble at Edinburgh on 8 April. They so far carried out their purpose; but further serious results were frustrated by James Douglas, 4th Earl of Morton, on whose advice the Earl of Sussex caused a diversion by advancing across the borders into the territories of the Maxwells. At Morton's request the lands of Lord Maxwell were spared, but those of Herries and the Johnstones were devastated (Scrope, 9 May, ib. entry 907). The shelter given by Herries to the English rebel Leonard Dacre led to further proceedings against him; and finally finding himself exposed to two fires — those of Elizabeth and the regent — he resolved to attempt a compromise by coming to terms with Elizabeth, and promising to employ his 'will and power in her service' (Sussex, 10 September ib. entry 1249). To preserve Elizabeth's good will he refrained from assisting the Hamiltons against the regent in the following February; but he earnestly entreated her to "take some good order for the restitution of Queen Mary, or her party would utterly despair of her goodness, and seek the aid of some other prince" (ib. entry 1581). On 17 May 1571 he eluded the forces sent to watch him by Morton, and joined Kirkcaldy in the castle of Edinburgh (ib. entry 1710), but shortly afterwards returned home (ib. entry 1721), his purpose having been merely to assist in mediating an agreement with Morton (ib. entry 1726). On 7 June he, however, again returned to Edinburgh to attend a parliament of the queen's party on the 12th (Calderwood, iii. 78, 91). On 21 August he informed Elizabeth that "he must do as the others do", unless Elizabeth showed some disposition to interfere on behalf of the queen of Scots (ib. entry 1934); and when finally he became convinced that Elizabeth would not interfere, he saw that Mary's cause was hopeless, and some time before the capture of the castle came to terms with the regent.

Along with his relative, Lord Maxwell, who laid claim to the earldom of Morton, Herries took an active part in the scheme for depriving Morton in 1578 of the regency. He was one of those sent by the king and council to Morton on 15 March to demand the delivery of the castle of Edinburgh (ib. p. 3), and was chosen a member of the new privy council after Morton's resignation. On Morton's return to power he for some time held aloof from him, but on 8 September was nominated with seven other noblemen to proceed on 20 September to Stirling to assist the king in the adoption of measures for "he repose and quietness of the troubled commonwealth". On 21 January 1578–9 he presented a discourse to the king on the management of the west borders, and shortly afterwards he was appointed to succeed his nephew, Lord Maxwell, as warden. On 21 August 1579 he was succeeded as warden by his hereditary enemy, Johnstone of Johnstone. On the execution of Morton in 1581, Herries, true to his Marian sympathies, became one of the most strenuous supporters of Esmé Stewart, 1st Duke of Lennox. After the raid of Ruthven in August 1582, he joined Lennox in Edinburgh, and was one of the nobles sent by Lennox to ask a private conference with the king, but had to return with a message that Lennox must leave Scotland. Herries died suddenly on Sunday, 20 January 1582–3, at Edinburgh, ‘in time of the afternoon preaching,’ in "an upper chamber in William Fowler's lodging", where, feeling too ill to go to the preaching, he had gone to "see the boys bicker". He was interred in the choir of the church of Terregles.

== Family ==
By his wife Agnes Herries, he had four sons and seven daughters:

- William Maxwell, 5th Lord Herries of Terregles
- Sir Robert Maxwell of Spottes
- Edward Maxwell, commendator of Dundrennan and laird of Lamington
- John Maxwell of Newlaw
- Elizabeth Maxwell, who married John Gordon of Lochinvar
- Margaret Maxwell, who married Mark Kerr, 1st Earl of Lothian
- Agnes Maxwell lady Amisfield
- Mary Maxwell, who married William Hay, 6th Lord Hay of Yester
- Sarah Maxwell, lady Johnstone
- Grizel Maxwell, lady Bombie
- Nicolas Maxwell, lady Lag.
