= Thomas Boynton (MP) =

English politician (1523–1582)

Thomas Boynton (1523–1582), of Acklam and Barmston, Yorkshire, was an English politician.

He was a member (MP) of the parliament of England for Boroughbridge in 1571 and for Cumberland in 1572.
