= John Huddleston (MP for Cumberland) =

English politician

John Huddleston (died 1493) was an English politician.

He was a member (MP) of the parliament of England for Cumberland in 1467.
