= Cumberland (constituency) =

Parliamentary constituency in the United Kingdom, 1801–1832

- Former county constituency for the House of Commons

1290–1832
- Seats: two
- Replaced by: Cumberland East and Cumberland West

Cumberland is a former United Kingdom Parliamentary constituency. It was a constituency of the House of Commons of the Parliament of England then of the Parliament of Great Britain from 1707 to 1800 and of the Parliament of the United Kingdom from 1801 to 1832. It was represented by two Knights of the Shire. It was divided between the constituencies of Cumberland East and Cumberland West in 1832.

== Members of Parliament ==
- Constituency created 1290

=== MPs 1290–1640 ===
Parliament	First member	Second member
1301	Sir John Wigton	
1305	Sir John Wigton	
1306	Sir John de Lucy	
1312	Andrew Harclay	
1313	Sir John Wigton	
1316	John de Skelton	
1324	Hugh de Lowther	
1325	Robert Parning	
1327	Robert Parning	
1328	Robert Parning	
1331	Robert Parning	
1332	Robert Parning	
1337	Thomas de Skelton	
1342	Hugh de Lowther	Peter de Tylliol
1344	Hugh de Lowther	John de Orreton
1345	Hugh de Lowther	Henry de Malton
1368	James Pickering	
1377	Richard de Sandys	Sir Richard Moubray
1377	John FitzHugh de Lowther	
1378	Peter Tilliol	
1380 (Jan)	Sir William Curwen	
1380 (Nov)	Peter Tilliol	
1383	John de Burgham	John de Kirby
1385	Sir Richard de Beaulieu	Sir Peter Tilliol
1386	Amand Monceaux	John Thirlwall
1388 (Feb)	Sir John de Derwentwater	Sir John Ireby
1388 (Sep)	Amand Monceaux	Sir Robert Muncaster
1390 (Jan)	Amand Monceaux	William de Threlkeld
1390 (Nov)	William Stapleton	Thomas Sands
1391	Sir Peter Tilliol	Robert Lowther
1393	Geoffrey Tilliol	William Lowther
1394	Sir Clement Skelton	Robert Lowther
1395	William Stapleton	Thomas Sands
1397 (Jan)	Sir John Ireby	Sir Clement Skelton
1397 (Sep)	Sir Peter Tilliol	William Osmundlaw
1399	Sir William Leigh	Roland Vaux
1401	Robert Lowther	William Stapleton
1402	Sir Peter Tilliol	John Skelton
1404 (Jan)	Sir Robert Lowther	William Lowther I
1404 (Oct)	John More I	William Bewley
1406	Sir Robert Lowther	Sir John Skelton
1407	William Stapleton	William More
1410	Sir Peter Tilliol	Christopher Moresby
1411		
1413 (Feb)		
1413 (May)	Sir Peter Tilliol	William Bewley
1414 (Apr)	(Sir) Robert Lowther	Sir William Leigh
1414 (Nov)	Sir Christopher Curwen	John Eaglesfield
1415		
1416 (Mar)	(Sir) John Lancaster	William Stapleton
1416 (Oct)		
1417	Sir Peter Tilliol	(Sir) Robert Lowther
1419	Sir Peter Tilliol	Richard Restwold I
1420	Sir Peter Tilliol	Thomas de la More
1421 (May)	Sir John Lamplugh	Richard Restwold II
1421 (Dec)	Sir Peter Tilliol	Sir Nicholas Radcliffe
1422	Sir Peter Tilliol	Sir John Skelton
1423	Sir Christopher Curwen	
1425	Sir Christopher Curwen	Sir Peter Tilliol
1426	Sir Peter Tilliol	
1427	Sir Christopher Curwen	Sir Nicholas Ratcliffe of Derwentwater
1431	Sir Christopher Curwen	
1432	Sir Christopher Curwen	
1445	Sir Thomas Parr	
1446	Sir John Penington	
1467	Sir John Huddleston	
1491	Sir Christopher Dacre	
1510–1515	No Names Known	
1523	?Sir Christopher Dacre	?
1529	Sir Christopher Dacre	John Lee I
1536		
1539		
1542	?Sir Thomas Wharton	?Hon. Sir Thomas Wharton
1545	Hon. Sir Thomas Wharton	Cuthbert Hutton
1547	Hon. Sir Thomas Wharton	Richard Musgrave
1553 (Mar)	(Sir) Richard Musgrave	Henry Curwen
1553 (Oct)	Hon. Sir Thomas Wharton	Thomas Dacre
1554 (Apr)	John Lee II	Robert Penruddock
1554 (Nov)	John Lee II	Robert Penruddock
1555	Thomas Threlkeld	Henry Curwen
1558	Leonard Dacre	John Dalston
1558–1559	Leonard Dacre	William Musgrave
1563 (Jan)	Leonard Dacre	Henry Curwen
1571	Sir Henry Percy, sat for Northumberland and repl. by ?	Sir Simon Musgrave
1572	Sir Simon Musgrave	Edward Scrope, died and repl. Nov 1580 by Sir Thomas Boynton?
1584	Thomas Scrope	Robert Bowes I
1586	Robert Bowes I	Henry Leigh
1588–9	Sir Thomas Scrope	Robert Bowes I
1593	Nicholas Curwen	Wilfred Lawson
1597	Joseph Pennington (MP)	Christopher Pickering
1601 (Oct)	William Huddleston	Gerard Lowther II
1604–1611	Sir Wilfred Lawson	Edward Musgrave
1614	Sir Wilfred Lawson	Sir Thomas Penruddock
1621–2	Sir George Dalston	Sir Henry Curwen
1624	Sir George Dalston	Ferdinando Huddleston
1625	Sir George Dalston	Patricius Curwen
1626	Sir George Dalston	Patricius Curwen
1628	Sir George Dalston	Sir Patricius Curwen, Bt
1629–1640	No Parliament summoned	

=== MPs 1640–1832 ===
Year	First member	First party	Second member	Second party
April 1640	Sir Patricius Curwen, Bt		Sir George Dalston	
November 1640	Sir Patricius Curwen, Bt		Sir George Dalston	Royalist
March 1643	Curwen and Dalston disabled to sit – both seats vacant			
1646	William Armine		Richard Tolson	
December 1648	William Armine		Tolson excluded in Pride's Purge – seat vacant	
1653	Cumberland was not separately represented in the Barebones Parliament. The following were nominated for The Four Northern Counties collectively: Major-General Charles Howard, Robert Fenwick, Henry Dawson, Henry Ogle			
1654	Colonel William Briscoe		Major-General Charles Howard	
1656	Colonel William Briscoe		Major-General Charles Howard	
January 1659	Colonel William Briscoe		Sir Wilfrid Lawson	
May 1659	Not represented in the restored Rump, Armine having died in the interim			
April 1660	Sir Wilfrid Lawson		Charles Howard	
1661	Sir Patricius Curwen, Bt		Sir George Fletcher, Bt	
1665	Sir John Lowther, Bt		Sir George Fletcher, Bt	
February 1679	Sir John Lowther, Bt		Richard Lamplugh	
August 1679	Sir John Lowther, Bt		Viscount Morpeth	
1681	Sir John Lowther, Bt		Sir George Fletcher, Bt	
1685	Sir John Lowther, Bt		The Viscount Preston	
1689	Sir John Lowther, Bt		Sir George Fletcher, Bt	
January 1701	Richard Musgrave		Gilfrid Lawson	
December 1701	Sir Edward Hasell		George Fletcher	Whig
1702	Richard Musgrave		Gilfrid Lawson	
1705	Richard Musgrave		George Fletcher	Whig
1708	James Lowther		Gilfrid Lawson	
1722	Sir Christopher Musgrave, Bt		Gilfrid Lawson	
1727	James Lowther		Gilfrid Lawson	
1734	James Lowther		Sir Joseph Pennington, Bt	
1745	James Lowther		Sir John Pennington, Bt	
1755	Sir William Lowther, Bt		Sir John Pennington, Bt	
1756	Sir William Fleming		Sir John Pennington, Bt	
1757	Sir James Lowther, Bt		Sir John Pennington, Bt	
1761	Sir Wilfrid Lawson, Bt		Sir John Pennington, Bt	
1762	Sir James Lowther, Bt	Tory	Sir John Pennington, Bt	
March 1768	Sir James Lowther, Bt	Tory	Henry Curwen	Whig
December 1768	Sir Henry Fletcher, Bt	Whig	Henry Curwen	Whig
1774	Sir Henry Fletcher, Bt	Whig	Sir James Lowther, Bt	Tory
1784	Sir Henry Fletcher, Bt	Whig	Sir William Lowther, Bt	Tory
1790	Sir Henry Fletcher, Bt	Whig	Humphrey Senhouse	Tory
1796	Sir Henry Fletcher, Bt	Whig	John Lowther	Tory
1806	Viscount Morpeth	Tory	John Lowther	Tory
1820	John Christian Curwen	Whig	John Lowther	Tory
1829	Sir James Graham, Bt	Whig	John Lowther	Tory
1831	Sir James Graham, Bt	Whig	William Blamire	Whig

- Constituency abolished (1832)

== Elections ==
The county franchise, from 1430, was held by the adult male owners of freehold land valued at 40 shillings or more. Each elector had as many votes as there were seats to be filled. Votes had to be cast by a spoken declaration, in public, at the hustings, which took place in the town of Cockermouth. The expense and difficulty of voting at only one location in the county, together with the lack of a secret ballot contributed to the corruption and intimidation of electors, which was widespread in the unreformed British political system.

The expense, to candidates, of contested elections encouraged the leading families of the county to agree on the candidates to be returned unopposed whenever possible. Contested county elections were therefore unusual.

== Election results ==
Election results taken from the History of Parliament Trust series.

=== Elections in the 18th century ===
General election 1715: Cumberland (2 seats)
Party	Candidate	Votes	%	±%
Nonpartisan	James Lowther	Unopposed	N/A	N/A
Nonpartisan	Gilfrid Lawson	Unopposed	N/A	N/A

General election 1722: Cumberland (2 seats)
Party	Candidate	Votes	%	±%
Nonpartisan	Christopher Musgrave	Unopposed	N/A	N/A
Nonpartisan	Gilfrid Lawson	Unopposed	N/A	N/A

General election 1727: Cumberland (2 seats)
Party	Candidate	Votes	%	±%
Nonpartisan	James Lowther	Unopposed	N/A	N/A
Nonpartisan	Gilfrid Lawson	Unopposed	N/A	N/A

- Note: James Lowther succeeded his brother as baronet in 1731

General election 1734: Cumberland (2 seats)
Party	Candidate	Votes	%	±%
Nonpartisan	James Lowther	Unopposed	N/A	N/A
Nonpartisan	Joseph Pennington	Unopposed	N/A	N/A

General election 1741: Cumberland (2 seats)
Party	Candidate	Votes	%	±%
Nonpartisan	James Lowther	Unopposed	N/A	N/A
Nonpartisan	Joseph Pennington	Unopposed	N/A	N/A

- Death of Pennington

By-Election 8 January 1745: Cumberland
Party	Candidate	Votes	%	±%
Nonpartisan	John Pennington	Unopposed	N/A	N/A

General election 1747: Cumberland (2 seats)
Party	Candidate	Votes	%	±%
Nonpartisan	James Lowther	Unopposed	N/A	N/A
Nonpartisan	John Pennington	Unopposed	N/A	N/A

- incomplete

General election 1768: Cumberland (2 seats)
Party	Candidate	Votes	%	±%
Whig	Henry Curwen	2,139	26.8	N/A
Tory	James Lowther	1,977	24.8	N/A
Whig	Henry Fletcher	1,975	24.7	N/A
Tory	Humphrey Senhouse	1,891	23.7	N/A

- On petition, Fletcher returned in place of Lowther, 16 December 1768

General election 1774: Cumberland (2 seats)
Party	Candidate	Votes	%	±%
Tory	James Lowther	976	45.2	N/A
Whig	Henry Fletcher	876	40.6	N/A
Tory	Joseph Pennington	305	14.1	N/A

- incomplete

General election 1820: Cumberland (2 seats)
Party	Candidate	Votes	%	±%
Tory	John Lowther	166	41.5	N/A
Whig	John Christian Curwen	138	34.5	N/A
Tory	George Howard	96	24.0	N/A

== See also ==
- List of former United Kingdom Parliament constituencies
- Unreformed House of Commons
