= Fletcher baronets =

Set index for Shelley baronets

There have been five creations of Fletcher baronets from 1641 to 1919, three of which are extinct. The creations of 1782 and 1796 descended to males with changed surnames.

- Fletcher baronets of Hutton le Forest (1641)
- Fletcher, later Aubrey-Fletcher baronets, of Clea Hall (and Ashley Park) (1782): see Aubrey-Fletcher baronets
- Fletcher, later Boughey baronets, of Newcastle-under-Lyme (1796): see Boughey baronets
- Fletcher baronets of Carrow (1812)
- Fletcher baronets of Ashe Ingen Court (1919): see John Samuel Fletcher
