= Thomas Penruddock =

English politician

Thomas Penruddock (c. 1578 – 1637) was an English politician.

He was a member (MP) of the parliament of England for Downton in 1601 and Cumberland 1614.

In John Aubrey's Brief Lives a fragment about Penruddock states that "(It was a) capital (offence) for a native Irishman to come to Dublin without a passe. Sir . . . espying . . . went into the corne . . . found him and hung him up immediately", the source being given as "Mr Anderson", with a note saying that this was a fragment on the "severity of the penal laws", and Mr Anderson was an informant on Irish matters in the life of Richard Boyle, Earl of Cork.
