= John Skelton (died 1439) =

English politician

Sir John Skelton (died February 1439) was an English politician and sheriff of Cumberland. He sat as MP for Cumberland in 1402, 1406 and 1422.

He was the son and heir of Nicholas Skelton (d. after June 1401). He married his first wife and had at least three sons. By February 1401, he married Alice, the daughter of Sir John Ireby and widow of Geoffrey Tilliol. He was knighted by February 1404.
