= William Bewley (MP) =

English politician

William Bewley (died 1433/4) was an English politician. He sat as MP for Cumberland in October 1404, and May 1413.

He was the son and heir of Richard Bewley (died before February 1413) of Thistlethwaite. He married and had three daughters.

He also served as collector of taxes in Cumberland in May 1398; collector of customs in Cumberland from 16 March 1401 till 8 August 1402; commissioner of array in Cumberland in April 1418, and March 1430; escheator of Cumberland and Westmorland from 4 November 1418 till 23 November 1419; and envoy to conserve the truce between England and Scotland on 25 October 1429.
