= Dalston Hall =

15th century house in Cumbria, England

Coordinates: 54.85466°N 2.97302°W

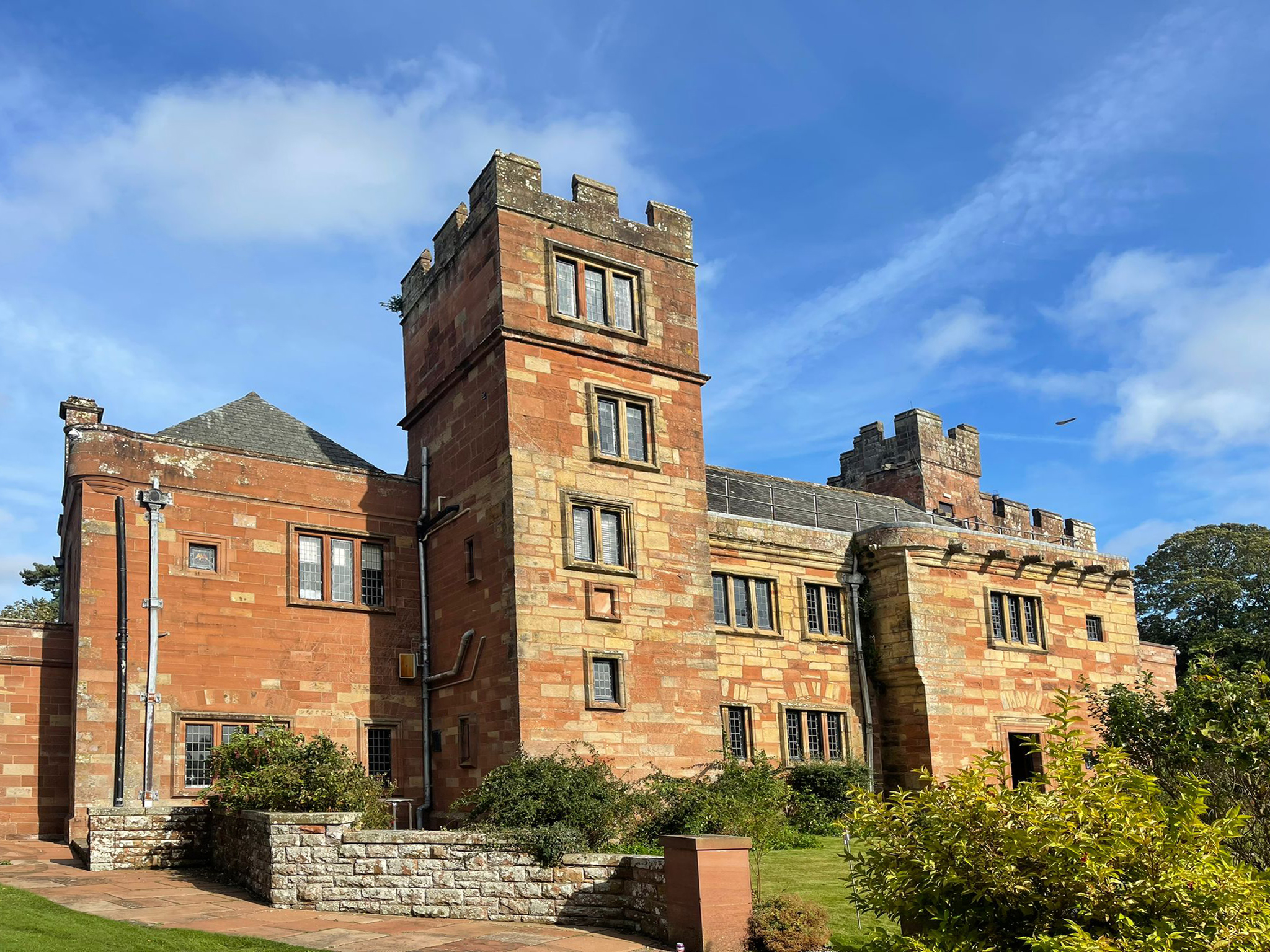
Dalston Hall

Dalston Hall is a fortified country house at Dalston in Cumbria, England. It is a Grade II* listed building.

== History ==
John Dalston (1479-1537) and his wife Elizabeth built Dalston Hall in about 1500. It incorporated a Peel tower and a baronial hall. An inscription below the parapet says JOHN DALLSTON ELSABET MI WYF MAD YS BYLDYNG.

His father was Robert Dalston who owned the land which had been passed to him from nine previous generations of this family. John married Elizabeth Kirkbride (1478-1535) at about the same time as they both built the hall. On the tower of the Hall there are four coats of arms – two of Kirkbride and two of Dalston.

When John died in 1537 the property was passed to his son Thomas Dalston (c.1502-1550). It then descended in this family to Sir John Dalston (1523-1580) then to his son Sir John Dalston (1556-1633). A west wing was added in 1556.

The hall was then inherited by his son Sir George Dalston. Sir George Dalston (1581-1657) was a zealous royalist and during the Siege of Carlisle when the parliamentary forces invaded in 1644-45 he was forced to flee from Dalston Hall. General David Leslie who commanded these forces used the Hall as his headquarter during the ten month long battle.

His son Sir William Dalston (1605-1683) inherited the Hall in 1657 when he died. In 1683 on the death of Sir William his son Sir John Dalston (1639-1711) became the owner. Sir John’s son Sir Charles Dalston (1686-1723) inherited the property in 1711 and his son Sir George Dalson (1718-1765) who was only five when his father died inherited the Hall when he came of age. Sir George had no male heir and his induced him to sell his Dalston estates in 1761.

The new owner was Monkhouse Davison who owned it for 32 years. Monkhouse Davison (1713–1793) was the senior partner in one of the leading grocers in 18th century London, Davison Newman and Co. They imported a wide range of produce including tea, coffee, sugar and spices. He did not marry and when he died in 1793 the property was sold. The new owner was John Sowerby who owned the Putteridge and Lilley manor house estates. John Sowerby (1745-1823) was a wealthy merchant and landowner. His brother was James Sowerby the famous naturalist. In 1768 he married Mary Anderson (died 1812). The couple had ten sons and six daughters. When John died in 1823 it was reported in a newspaper that “the whole of his wealth was estimated at about a million.

His eldest son George Sowerby (1794-1868) inherited Dalston Hall. He married Anne Johnson and the couple had two sons and two daughters. After his death in 1868 his eldest son Colonel George Sowerby (1832-1888) became the owner of the Hall. He married in 1863 Emily Isabella Jane Airey. They had three sons and three daughters. His eldest son Thomas George Sowerby (1866-1932) inherited the property on his death in 1888.

Nine years later in 1897 he sold the whole Dalston Hall estate. The advertisement for this sale is shown. Dalston Hall and some of the estate was bought by Edmund Wright Stead. Edmund Wright Stead (1862- 1934) was the owner and director of Stead McAlpin, calico printers. Shortly before he bought the Hall he had married Gertrude Willes Grundy (1869-1942) who was the daughter of the Reverend George Frederick Grundy. Their wedding ceremony was described in depth in the local newspaper.

Edmund made extensive interior alterations to the Hall and employed the architect C.J. Ferguson to remodel the frontage in red sandstone in 1899. When he died in 1934 he left the house to his wife Gertrude. She lived there for two years then in 1936 sold it to Sir James Morton. Sir James Morton (1867-1943) was a Scottish pioneer of fast dyes. In 1901 he married Beatrice Emily Fagan and the couple had two sons and four daughters. James inherited the family textile manufacturing business when his father died. He was very unhappy about the way his textiles faded so he resolved to create dyes whose colours would last. He was successful and he marketed the dyes to high-end fashion stores like Burberry and Liberty’s. For his achievements he was knighted in 1936 by King George VI, the same year he bought Dalston Hall. He died in 1943 and the Hall was sold.

The hall has been used as a youth training centre and, from 1971, operated as a public hotel.

Dalston Hall is now owned by The Gilchrist Collection and operates as a wedding venue.

== In popular culture ==
Dalston Hall featured in episode six of the sixth series of the Living TV series Most Haunted.

== See also ==
- Grade II* listed buildings in Cumbria
- Listed buildings in Dalston, Cumbria
