= Hugh de Lowther (died 1317) =

English noble and administrator

- Arms of the Lowther family
- Monarch: Edward I later Edward II

Hugh de Lowther of Lowther and Newton Reigny, was an English noble and administrator. He was Sheriff of Edinburgh in 1295.

He was the eldest son of Geoffrey de Lowther. Hugh was Kings Attorney in 1291-1292, Sheriff of Edinburgh in 1295 and Justice Itinerant in 1307.

== Marriage and issue ==
Hugh married Ivetta, daughter of Henry D'Alneto, they are known to have had the following known issue:

- Hugh de Lowther
