= Henry Curwen (1528–1596) =

English landowner and Member of Parliament

Henry Curwen (1528–1596) was an English landowner and Member of Parliament for Cumberland.

== Life and work ==
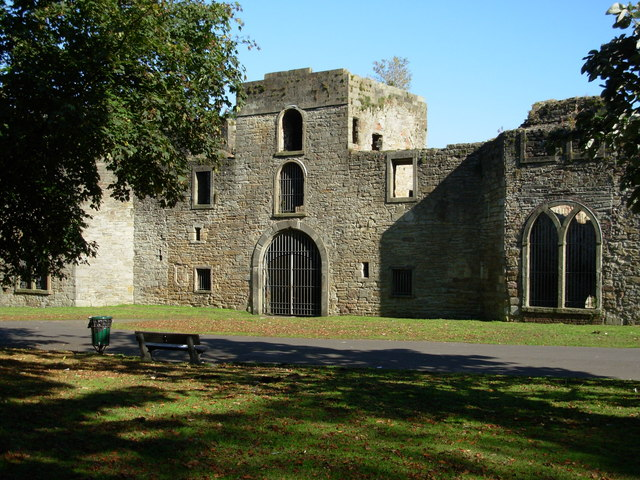
Ruins of Workington Hall

He was a son of Thomas Curwen of Workington (died 1544) and Agnes Strickland.

In 1568 Mary, Queen of Scots came to Workington by boat as a fugitive after her defeat at the battle of Langside. She stayed a night at Workington Hall as a guest of Henry Curwen's family. Mary's secretary Claude Nau later described how Lord Herries went to meet Curwen, who he knew well, with the news of Mary's arrival. Herries intended to pretend at first that the queen was a Scottish heiress. Curwen however was in London. The party were welcomed at the Hall and Mary's true identity was soon discovered.

Mary wrote to Elizabeth from Workington Hall on 17 May, asking for assistance. An agate cup was treasured by the family as her gift to her hosts, known as the "Luck of Workington Hall". Mary is said also to have stayed in the house of Henry Fletcher (died 1574) at Cockermouth, who gave her a velvet gown and was said to have had her letter of thanks.

Richard Lowther wrote that Mary was attended by Claude Hamilton, Lord Fleming, Lord Herries, and twenty servants or courtiers. He met her at Cockermouth and escorted her to Carlisle on 18 May. George Lamplugh wrote that Curwen and his wife were away (at Bath) and sent the names of the lords attending Mary to the Earl of Northumberland. He mentioned one gentlewoman and did not know the names of the others.

In 1570 Henry Curwen and Simon Musgrave were knighted and joined an army led by the Earl of Sussex sent into Scotland to support Regent Moray against the supporters of Mary, Queen of Scotland in the west. Henry Curwen brought back an iron yett or gate from the Maxwell stronghold at Caerlaverock Castle which he displayed at Workington.

== Marriage and family ==
Henry Curwen was first betrothed to Agnes Wharton, a daughter of Thomas Wharton, 1st Baron Wharton. He married Mary Fairfax, a daughter of Nicolas Fairfax of Walton. His family included:

- Lady Jane Christian;
- Nicholas Curwen, who married, (1) Anne, daughter of Simon Musgrave, (2) Elizabeth Carus, a daughter of the lawyer Thomas Carus.
- Joan Whitfield
- Agnes Curwen married James Bellingham of Helsington.
- Mabel (1) Christian (2) Fairfax
- Henry Curwen
- Margaret Curwen
- Matthew Curwen

Curwen's second wife was Jane Crosby. Their children included George and Thomas Curwen.

== The 1597 inventory of Workington Hall ==
An inventory of furnishings and farm stock was made in 1597, after the death of Henry Curwen. Bedrooms included the Green Chamber, the Tower Chamber (hanged with "Arras work"), the Dungeon Chamber, the Queen's Chamber (where Mary, Queen of Scots stayed), the Sill Chamber, the Bell Chamber, the Chapel Chamber, George Dyke's Chamber, a nursery, and the old Lady's Chamber, where there was a square table with a joint stool, a warming pan, and a "trundle bed" kept under the main bed. The hall was furnished with tables and benches, and two spears. The parlour was now a bedroom. Henry Curwen's clothes included velvet breeches and two old satin doublets. His bed chamber was over the courtyard gate.
