= Christopher Pickering (MP) =

English politician

Sir Christopher Pickering (c. 1556 – 15 January 1621) was an English politician.

He was the only son of William Pickering, who he succeeded in 1587. He was knighted in 1607.

He was a Justice of the Peace for Cumberland from c. 1590 and was appointed to serve as High Sheriff of Cumberland for 1590–91, 1605–06, 1607–08 and 1611–12. He was deputy warden of the west march in 1601 and a commissioner for the borders in 1608. He was elected a member (MP) of the parliament of England for Cumberland in 1597.

He died unmarried.
