= William Musgrave (MP) =

Member of Parliament

William Musgrave MP, (1518–1597) of Hayton Castle was an English politician who served as a Member of Parliament for the Cumberland Division.

== Family ==
William Musgrave was born at Hayton Castle, son of Sir Thomas Musgrave, Marshal of Berwick and his wife, Elizabeth Dacre. He married Isabel Martindale, daughter and co-heiress of James Martindale of Newton, Allerdale, Cumberland, and the widow of his maternal uncle, Humphrey Dacre of Gilsland. Their marriage produced six children, Thomas Musgrave of Brakenburgh (died two months before his father); Sir Edward Musgrave MP, Anne, John, Jane and Leonard.

== Sir Thomas Musgrave, Marshal of Berwick ==
Sir Thomas Musgrave (1483-1532) was born at Hayton Castle, the son of Nicholas Musgrave and his wife, Margaret Colville-Tilliol. He married Elizabeth Dacre, daughter of Thomas Dacre, 2nd Baron Dacre of Gilsland and Elizabeth de Greystoke, and had nine children by her. He died on 23 February 1532, at Hayton; however an inquisition into his estate lasted until 1536. He became Constable of Bewcastle, a border castle and village near Carlisle, during a lawless period, when during raids by marauding Scots, such castles became sanctuaries. The 16th century saw tenancy by the Musgraves, who defended it against their sworn enemies, the Grahams and Armstrongs. Sir Thomas also received the appointment of Marshal of Berwick, a town with a strategic castle on the eastern coast of England, bordering with Scotland. The castle's location in the hotly disputed border region between England and Scotland made it one of the most important strongholds in the British Isles, and it enjoyed an eventful history. As a major tactical objective in the region, the castle was captured by both the English and Scots on a number of occasions and frequently sustained substantial damage.

== Bibliography ==
- William Hutchinson (1797). The History Of Cumberland Vol. 2. London.
- T. Bulmer (1901). History and Directory of Cumberland. Preston: T. Bulmer & Co. Hesperus Press Ltd.
- William Betham (2011). The Baronetage of England Volume 5; Or the History of the English Baronets, and Such Baronets of Scotland, as Are of English Families; With Genealogic. London: Nabu Press.
