= George Dalston =

English politician

Sir George Dalston (1581–1657) of Dalston Hall, Cumberland was an English politician who sat in the House of Commons of England between 1621 and 1643. He supported the Royalist cause in the English Civil War.

== Life ==
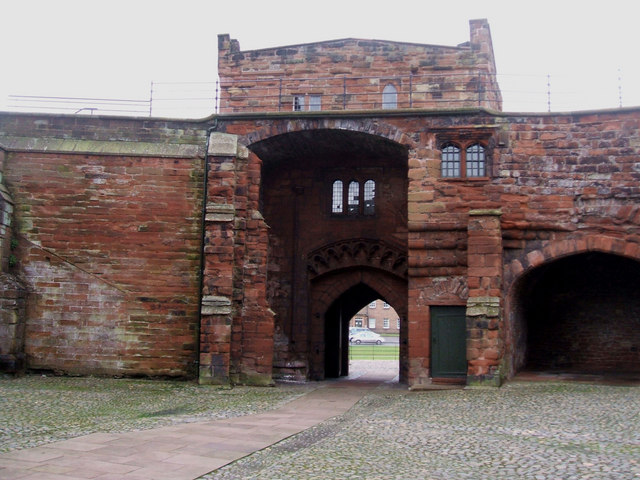
Captain's Tower, Carlisle Castle

Dalston was the eldest son of Sir John Dalston, of Dalston Hall, Cumberland and his second wife Frances Warcop, daughter of Thomas Warcop, of Smardale, Westmorland. He matriculated from Queens' College, Cambridge in about 1596. He was knighted on 26 June 1607.

He was appointed Captain of Carlisle Castle, Cumberland from 1608 to at least 1643. He served as a justice of the peace for Cumberland and Westmorland from 1615 to 1644 and in 1618 was High Sheriff of Cumberland. He was Custos Rotulorum of Cumberland from 1641 to 1644.

In 1621 Dalston was elected member of parliament for Cumberland. He was re-elected MP for Cumberland in 1624. He was awarded BA and MA from Trinity College, Cambridge in 1624. In 1628 he was elected MP for Cumberland again and sat until 1629 when King Charles I decided to rule without parliament for eleven years. He succeeded his father to Dalston Hall in 1633.

In April 1640, when parliament reassembled for the Short Parliament Dalston was elected MP for Cumberland again. He was re-elected in November 1640 for the Long Parliament but was disabled for supporting the king in 1643. In the 1644-5 Siege of Carlisle he was forced to flee Dalston Hall when General Leslie requisitioned it as the Covenantor headquarters.

Dalston died in September 1657 and his funeral sermon was preached by Jeremy Taylor. He had married Catharine Thornworth, daughter of John Thornworth, of Halsted, Leicestershire. Their son William was MP for Carlisle and a supporter of the king.

Parliament of England
Preceded by Sir Thomas Penruddock; Sir William Lawson	Member of Parliament for Cumberland; 1621–1629; With: Sir Henry Curwen 1621–1622; Ferdinando Huddleston 1624–1625; Sir Patricius Curwen 1625–1629	Parliament suspended until 1640
Vacant Parliament suspended since 1629	Member of Parliament for Cumberland; 1640–1643; With: Sir Patricius Curwen	Succeeded by William Armine; Richard Tolson
