= Richard Restwold (died c. 1423) =

English politician

Richard Restwold (c. 1364 – c. 1423), of High Head Castle, Cumbria, Sindlesham, Berkshire and Crowmarsh Gifford, Oxfordshire, was an English politician.

He was a member (MP) of the parliament of England for Cumberland in 1419. He was the father of Richard Restwold, also an MP for Cumberland.
