= Richard Restwold (died 1475) =

English politician

Richard Restwold (died 1475), of High Head Castle, Cumbria, Sindlesham, Berkshire and Crowmarsh Gifford, Oxfordshire, was an English politician.

He was a member (MP) of the Parliament of England for Cumberland in May 1421, for Berkshire in 1425, 1432, 1442 and 1445, and for Oxfordshire in 1439. He was the son of Richard Restwold, also an MP for Cumberland.
