= Workington Hall =

Ruined building in Workington, Cumbria, England

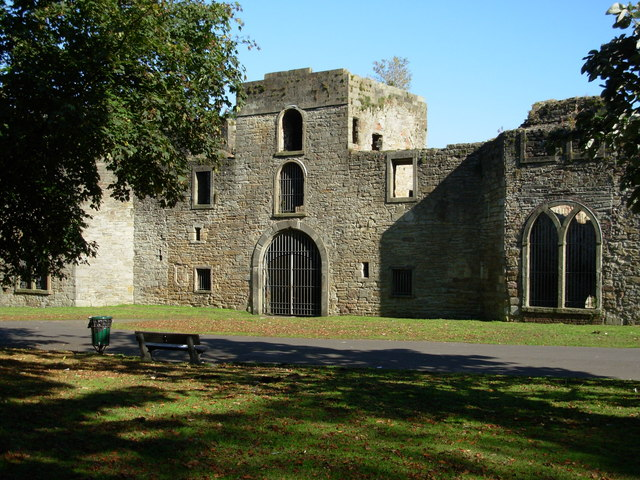
- The building in 2007

- Shown in Cumbria
- 54.644634°N 3.53894°W
- Location: Ladies' Walk, Workington

History
- Built: 1404

Site notes
- Architectural style: Medieval style

Listed Building – Grade I
- Official name: Workington Hall
- Designated: 6 June 1951
- Reference no.: 1144479

Workington Hall, sometimes called Curwen Hall, is a ruined building on the Northeast outskirts of the town of Workington in Cumbria. It is a Grade I listed building.

== History ==
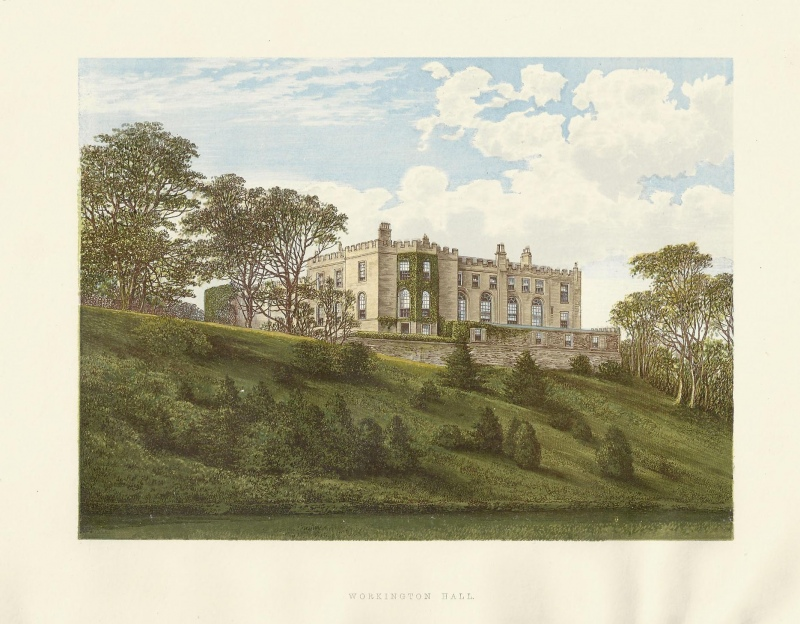
Workington Hall circa 1880

A peel tower was built on the site in 1362. The present house dates back to around 1404 and was built as a fortified tower house.

In 1568, Mary, Queen of Scots wrote a letter from Workington Hall to Queen Elizabeth I of England. After the defeat of her forces at the Battle of Langside and disguised as an ordinary woman, Mary crossed the Solway Firth and landed at Workington. Her companion, Lord Herries, knew the family of Henry Curwen and so Mary spent her first night in England as an honoured guest at Workington Hall. On 18 May 1568, Mary was escorted to Carlisle Castle after spending a day at Cockermouth. She was 25 years old.

Additions to the house were carried out by John Carr in the 1780s and the gardens were laid out by Thomas White at around the same time.

In the early 19th century the lord of the manor at Workington Hall was John Christian Curwen, born John Christian, who inherited the hall from Eldred Curwen in 1790 and took the Curwen name. He was Member of Parliament for Carlisle from 1786 to 1812 and from 1816 to 1820, following this with a period as member for Cumberland from 1820 to 1828. Workington changed radically both economically and socially, during the period when John Christian was lord of the manor (1783–1828). A Curwen through his mother's side, ...he is the man who stands out...who must rank as one of the most interesting and progressive of Cumbrians of his day. The hall remained the family home of the Curwen family until 1929 when it passed to the Chance family by marriage.

The hall was requisitioned by the War Office at the start of the Second World War and suffered a serious fire while the troops were billetted there. The family passed the hall over to Workington Borough Council after the War so it could be used as a Town Hall but conversion to this use never happened.

== See also ==
- Grade I listed buildings in Cumbria
- Listed buildings in Workington
