= St James' Church, Hayton =

Church in Hayton, Cumbria, England

Coordinates: 54.762593°N 3.384152°W

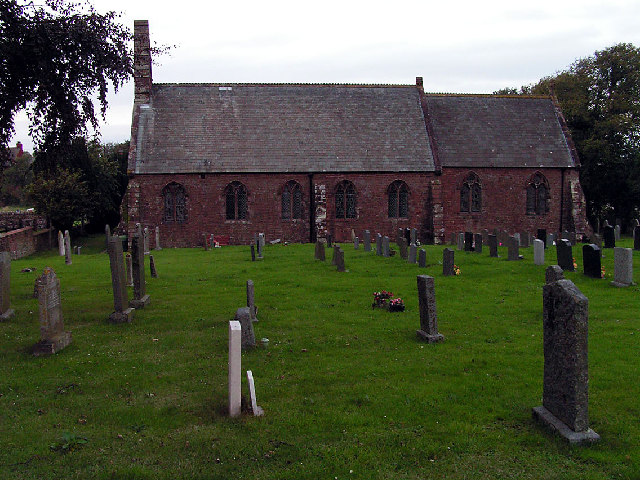
St James' Church in 2005

St James Church, Hayton, Cumbria is an active Anglican parish church in the deanery of Solway, the archdeaconry of West Cumberland and the diocese of Carlisle. The church dates from the 19th century.

== Location ==
The village of Hayton, Cumbria lies two miles southwest of the town of Aspatria and half a mile northwest of Prospect, and is signposted from the A596 road. The church sits in the centre of the village, on the south side of the village green.

== Description ==
Hayton parish church is dedicated to St James and is a member of the group of churches in the Solway Deanery under the patronage of the Bishop of Carlisle. Before 1868, the village of Hayton was included in the parish of Aspatria and as such the inhabitants had to walk the two miles to worship at St. Kentigern's Church, which is where the Musgrave family installed their private chapel. However, in that year Hayton was constituted a separate ecclesiastic district in accordance with the provisions of Lord Blandford's New Parishes Act 1856 (19 & 20 Vict. c. 104). After which it became a separate parish in conjunction with the neighbouring villages of Allerby, Outerside, Prospect and a short stretch of the Solway Coast at Mealo, as well as many outlying farms. The church, built on a site donated by a Mr Blackburn, the then occupant of Hayton Castle was designed by the firm of architects, Travis of Manchester at a cost of about £1,300. The foundation stone was laid on 3 May 1865, by F. L. B. Dykes of Dovenby Hall. It was consecrated on 5 November 1867 by Bishop Waldergrave. The design is transitional between early decorative English and the gothic style using local red sandstone as the building material. The roof is an open timbered one. The church was designed to accommodate 230 worshippers. It consists of a nave and chancel, the latter well recessed and is separated from the nave by a beautiful arch with a lofty span. The length of the nave is 16.6 metres and the breadth 7.8 metres. The chancel, the roof of which is a little lower than that of the nave, is 8.4 metres in length and 6.4 metres in breadth. Inside it is spacious and well-maintained with an attractive wrought iron screen dividing the naïve from the chancel and two fine Stained glass windows which admit a flood of variously tinted light. The one at the east end bears a representation of the ascension of Jesus and is dedicated to the memory of Ann Blackburn of Hayton Castle, to whose memory was also erected the rood screen. The west window was inserted by Joseph Hetherington, which he dedicated to the memory of his wife and three children. It consists of three lights; in the upper half of the centre light, Christ is represented as blessing little children; in the lower one he his seen in the house of Simon the Leper, as described in the gospels. In the north light he is shown as the Light of the World, a copy of the celebrated painting by William Holman Hunt; and in the south light, Christ is represented as the Good Shepherd. There is also a two-light window, portraying the carrying of the cross and the crucifixion, inserted by the parishioners and friends to the memory of Thomas Thwaites, first rector of Hayton, who died 22 November 1884. The lectern in the form of an eagle was the gift of a Mrs Todd of Hayton. The wooden pulpit on the north side of the chancel was hand carved, and the reading desk on the south side. A reredos was erected in 1875, paid for by public subscription to the memory of John Atkinson, a previous churchwarden and through whose organisational skills the church was erected. The font, which is over 800 years old, stands in the church near the porch, it is an interesting relic of antiquity and was formerly in the chapel at Hayton Castle. The pipe organ was installed as a war memorial. The rectory, now a private house, was a gift of the Bishop of Carlisle.

== Modern day ==
In addition to Sunday worship, regular social events are held, and there is an active parochial church council where church members from all three parishes of the benefice join for some activities, such as meetings of the Mothers' Union and study groups. The church also has strong links with the local primary school at Oughterside.

== Bibliography ==
- T. Bulmer (1901). History and Directory of Cumberland. Preston: T. Bulmer & Co. Hesperus Press Ltd.
- J. B. Bailey (1920). History of the Churches in the Maryport Rural Deanery. Cockermouth: Times Office.
- J. Rose; M. Dunglinson (1987). Aspatria. Chichester: Phillimore.
