= Milefortlet 20 =

Roman coastal fort in Cumbria, England

- Location within Cumbria
- 54.756555°N 3.435834°W
- Type: Milecastle
- Location: Cumbria, England

Milefortlet 20 (Low Mire) was a Milefortlet of the Roman Cumbrian Coast defences. These milefortlets and intervening stone watchtowers extended from the western end of Hadrian's Wall, along the Cumbrian coast and were linked by a wooden palisade. They were contemporary with defensive structures on Hadrian's Wall. There is little to see on the ground, but Milefortlet 20 has been located and excavated.

== Description ==
Milefortlet 20 is situated on the coast in the civil parish of Oughterside and Allerby. It is located on a low ridge on a gentle slope facing southeast.

== Excavations ==
The site was excavated in 1969 and 1980. The 1969 excavations revealed the turf rampart, and an entrance at the rear rampart. There were traces of floor timbers and many nails indicating internal buildings of wood. The 1980 excavations revealed the fortlet's front and rear gates and an oven. The fortlet underwent three phases of occupation during the second century; at the end of which it was abandoned. There is evidence that it was in use during the fourth century possibly as a watch post.

== Associated Towers ==
Each milefortlet had two associated towers, similar in construction to the turrets built along Hadrian's Wall. These towers were positioned approximately one-third and two-thirds of a Roman mile to the west of the Milefortlet, and would probably have been manned by part of the nearest Milefortlet's garrison. The towers associated with Milefortlet 20 are known as Tower 20A (grid reference NY073407) and Tower 20B (grid reference NY07024038). The location of Tower 20A is uncertain. Tower 20B was located and partially excavated in 1962. The foundations were 6.3 metres by 6.6 metres. A single sherd of a cooking pot was the only occupation evidence found.
