= Musgrave baronets of Hayton Castle (1638) =

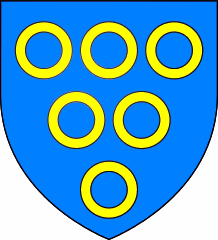
Escutcheon of the Musgrave baronets of Hayton Castle

The Musgrave baronetcy, of Hayton Castle in the County of Cumberland, was created in the Baronetage of Nova Scotia on 20 October 1638 for Edward Musgrave. He was an Oxford graduate, and had entered Gray's Inn earlier that year. The family was a cadet branch of the Musgraves of the first creation.

The 3rd Baronet represented Cumberland in the House of Commons in 1701, and from 1702 to 1708. The title became extinct on the death of the 10th Baronet in 1875.

== Musgrave baronets, of Hayton Castle (1638) ==
- Sir Edward Musgrave, 1st Baronet (c. 1621–1673)
- Sir Richard Musgrave, 2nd Baronet (c. 1650–1710)
- Sir Richard Musgrave, 3rd Baronet (c. 1675–1711)
- Sir Richard Musgrave, 4th Baronet (c. 1701–1739)
- Sir Richard Hylton, 5th Baronet (c. 1724–1755)
- Sir William Musgrave, 6th Baronet (1735–1800) FRS (1774), FSA (1778)., He was "a promoter of literature, & well known for a valuable collection illustrating the History of England".
- Sir Thomas Musgrave, 7th Baronet (1737–1812), Colonel of the 76th Regiment of Foot
- Sir James Musgrave, 8th Baronet (c. 1752–1814)
- Sir James Musgrave, 9th Baronet (1785–1858)
- Sir William Augustus Musgrave, 10th Baronet (1792–1875)
