= Gatehouse =

Entrance building

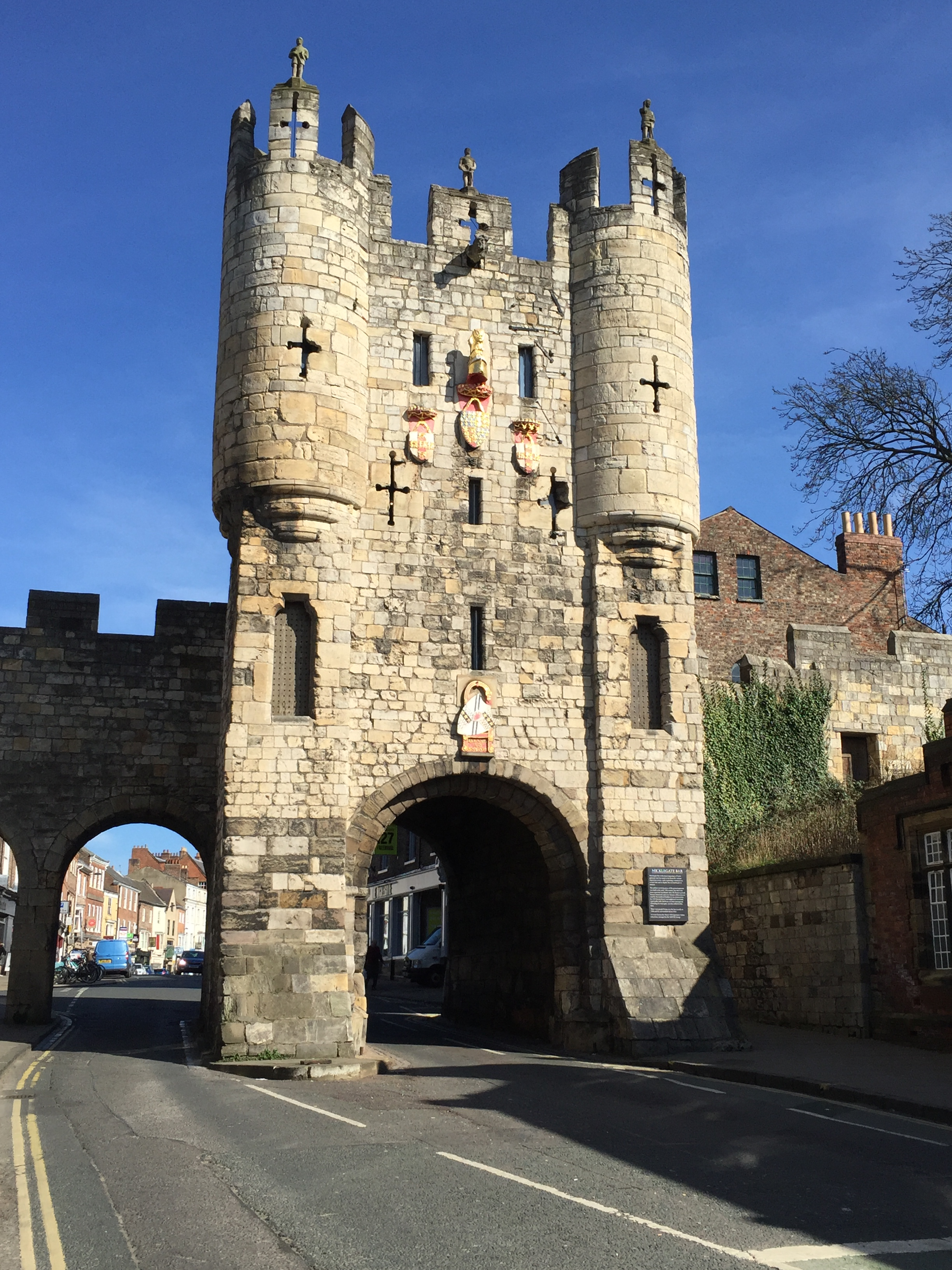
The southern entrance to York, Micklegate Bar

A gatehouse is a building that contains the entrance to a large structure or complex, such as a walled town, castle, manor, monastery or academic college, enabling the entrance to be controlled or defended by the inhabitants. Gatehouses are often the most heavily defended section of a fortification, as the gate was the easiest point for an enemy to attack. Fortified gates or gateways appear in the Bronze Age and reach into the modern times. There are numerous surviving examples around the world, especially from medieval Europe.

== History ==
Gatehouses made their first appearance in the early antiquity, when it became necessary to enclose settlements with defences. Famous early examples of such gates include the Ishtar Gate in Babylon. The Romans built fortifications with gatehouses throughout Europe and the Mediterranean, such as the Porta San Paolo in the Aurelian Walls of Rome and the Porta Nigra at Trier in Germany.

Strongly fortified medieval gatehouses may include a drawbridge, one or more portcullises, machicolations, arrow loops and murder-holes where stones would be dropped on attackers. In some castles, the gatehouse was so strongly fortified it took on the function of a keep, sometimes referred to as a "gatehouse keep". In the late Middle Ages, some of these arrow loops might have been converted into gun loops (or gun ports). A very large French gatehouse might be called a châtelet (small castle). Medieval urban defences also incorporated gatehouses, such as Monnow Bridge in Monmouth. York has four important gatehouses, known as "Bars", in its city walls including the Micklegate Bar.

At the end of the Middle Ages, many gatehouses in England and France were converted into beautiful, grand entrance structures to manor houses or estates. Many of them became a separate feature, free-standing or attached to the manor or mansion only by an enclosing wall. By this time, the gatehouse had lost its defensive purpose and had become more of a monumental structure designed to harmonise with the manor or mansion.

== Examples ==
=== England ===
- Balkerne Gate, Colchester, a surviving Roman city gate
- Dover Castle, Kent, the Constable's Gate is the largest surviving gatehouse in England
- Durham Castle, in Durham has an 11th-century gatehouse that is now used as accommodation for students attending University College, Durham.
- Layer Marney Tower, the epitome of the Tudor gatehouse.
- Stokesay Castle, a 13th-century fortified manor house in Shropshire has a Jacobean half-timbered gatehouse.
- Stanway House, Stanway, Gloucestershire, where the gatehouse measures 44 ft. by 22 ft. and has three storeys.
- Westwood House, Worcestershire, which has a frontage of 54 ft. with two storeys.
- Burton Agnes Hall, East Riding of Yorkshire, which has three storeys and is flanked by great octagonal towers at the angles.
- Hylton Castle, Hylton, Sunderland, a combination of gatehouse and tower house
- Bargate, Southampton. Constructed in 1180 as part of the Southampton town walls
- Tonbridge Castle, Kent, the first surviving gatehouse-keep
- Westgate, Canterbury, designed by Henry Yevele
- Westgate and Kingsgate, Winchester, the latter with a church above
- Several gates, all originally in the form of a single tower with barbican, survive in York city walls, including Bootham Bar, Micklegate Bar, Monk Bar and Walmgate Bar.

=== France ===
- Château de Châteaubriant, two gatehouses (13th and 14th century), one for the lower bailey, one for the upper ward.
- Château de Suscinio, a large 15th-century gatehouse in the logis-porte style, Morbihan, Brittany.
- Château de Trécesson, a simple 14th-century gatehouse on a moated manor house in Morbihan, Brittany (see French Wikipedia page, Château de Trécesson)
- Château de Vitré, a large 15th-century châtelet or gatehouse in Ille-et-Vilaine, Brittany

=== Germany ===
In German, "gatehouse" is Torburg (lit. "Gate castle").

- Kasselburg, Rhineland-Palatinate, a tall twin-towered gatehouse.
- Porta Nigra, Trier, a Roman city gate converted to a church in the Middle Ages

=== Russia ===
- Golden Gate, Vladimir

=== Spain ===
- Puerta del Sol, Toledo

=== Ukraine ===
- Golden Gate, Kyiv

=== United States ===
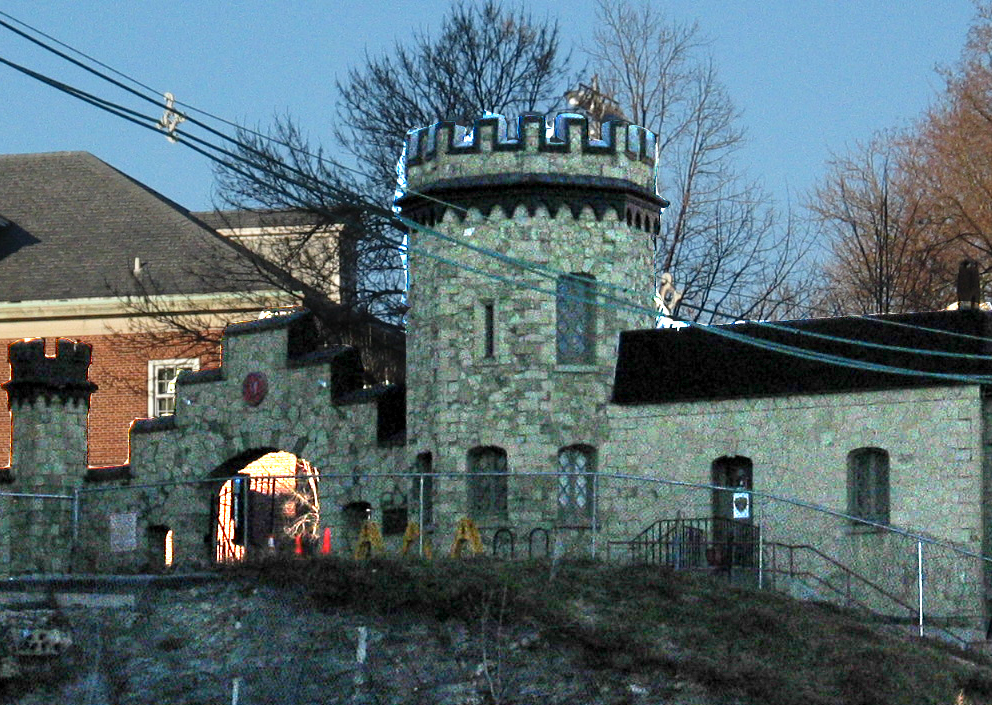
Castle Gatehouse, Hoboken

- Latrobe Gate, a Greek Revival and Italianate gatehouse built in 1806, Washington, D.C.
- Lorraine Park Cemetery Gate Lodge, a Queen Anne style stone and frame building constructed in 1884, Woodlawn, Baltimore County, Maryland.
- Castle Gatehouse, at Stevens Institute of Technology, Hoboken, New Jersey
- The Ballantine Gate (1889), Branch Brook Park, Forest Hill, Newark, New Jersey

=== Wales ===
The gatehouse-keep was greatly used in the Welsh castles of Edward I.

- Beaumaris Castle has two incomplete gatehouse-keeps.
- Caernarfon Castle has two large gatehouses, both unfinished: King's Gate and Queen's Gate.
- Caerphilly Castle has two gatehouse-keeps (one rebuilt in the 20th century) and five smaller gatehouses.
- Harlech Castle has a gatehouse-keep with an outer gatehouse in front.
- Monnow Bridge, Monmouth, a fortified bridge

=== On coats of arms ===
The gatehouse could be used in heraldry to symbolise a city or fortification, for example at:

- Bad Kissingen
- Dinslaken
- Königswinter
- Limerick
- Neubrandenburg
- Uedem
- Wassenberg
- Wiehl
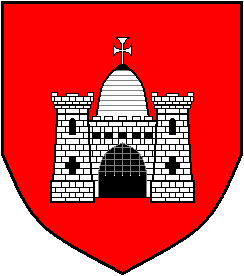
Limerick

Dinslaken

Königswinter

Wiehl

== Gallery ==
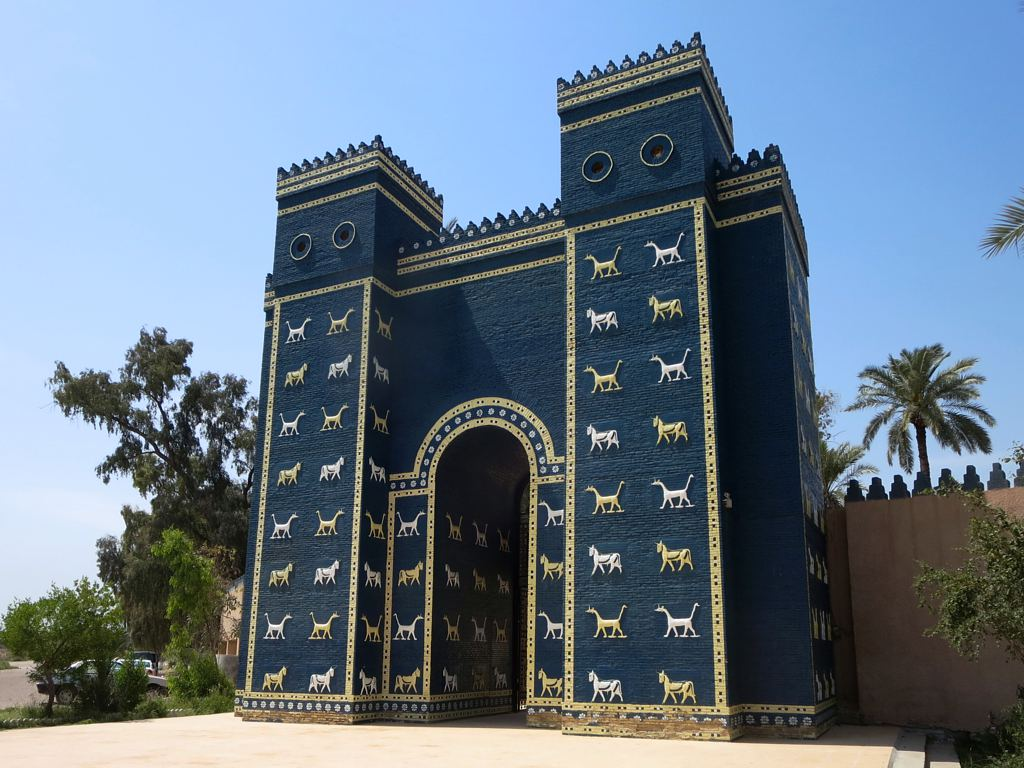
The Ishtar Gate, Babylon

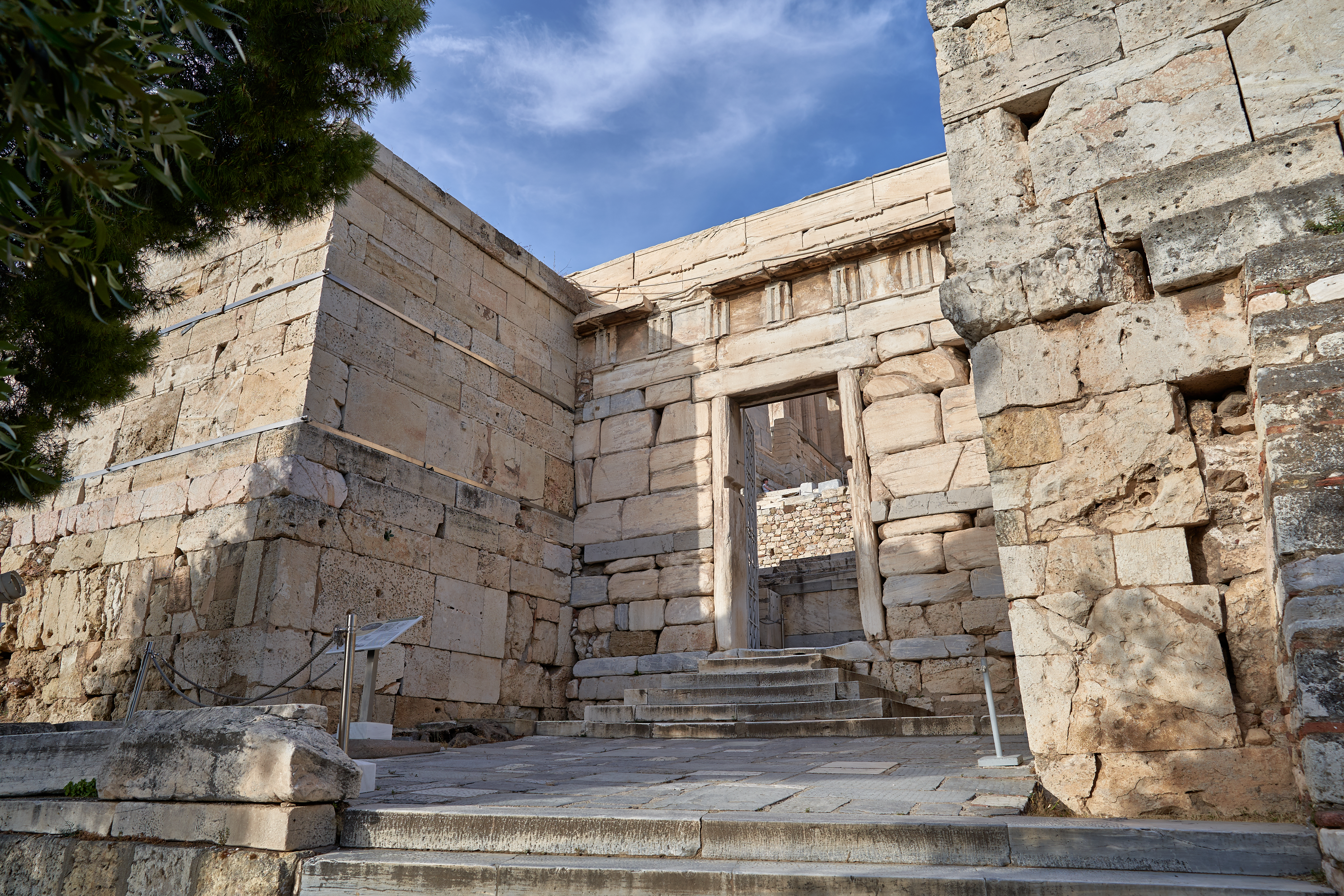
The Beulé Gate to the Acropolis, Athens

The Porta Nigra, Trier

The gatehouse of Lorsch Abbey, Germany

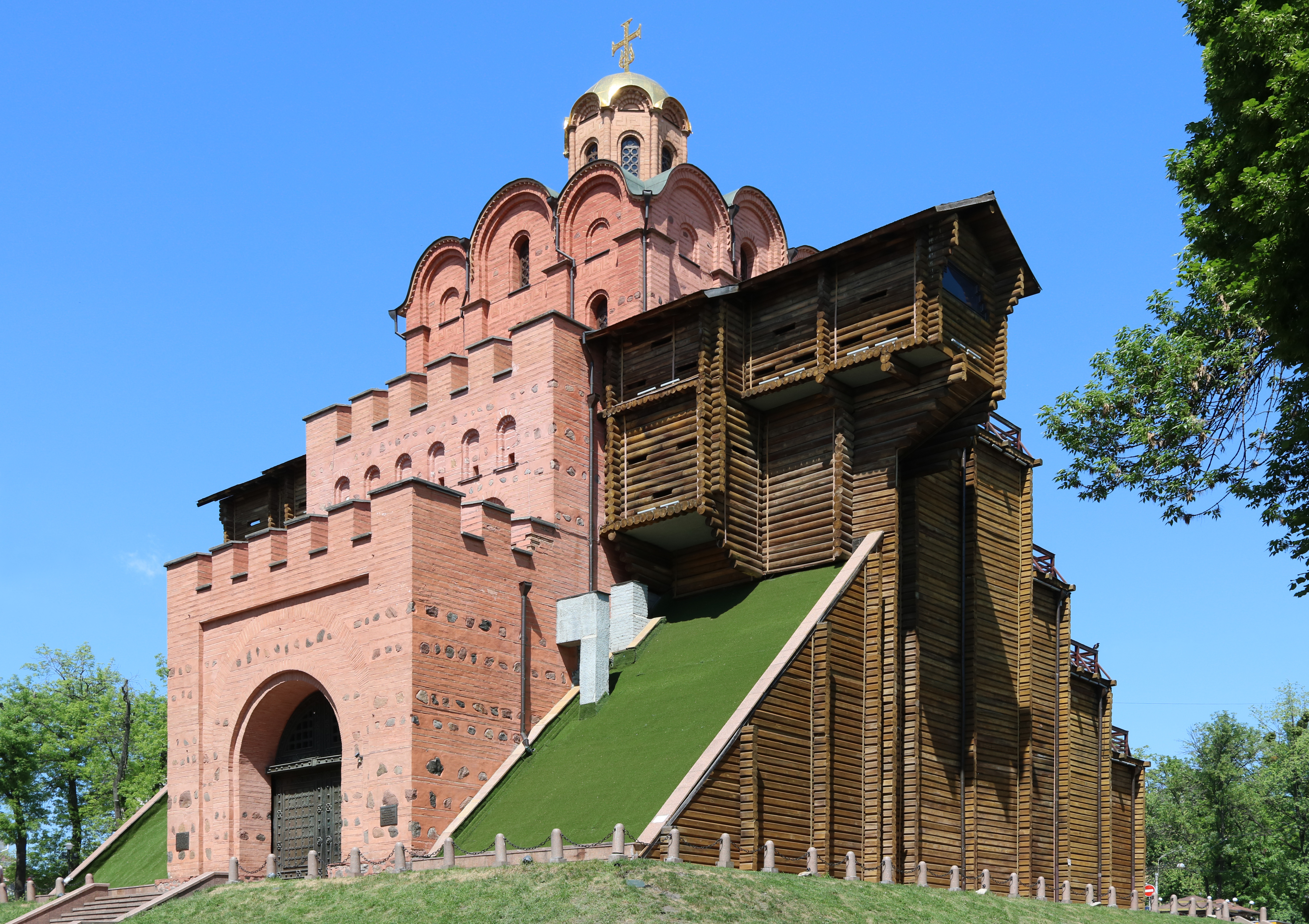
The Golden Gate of Kyiv

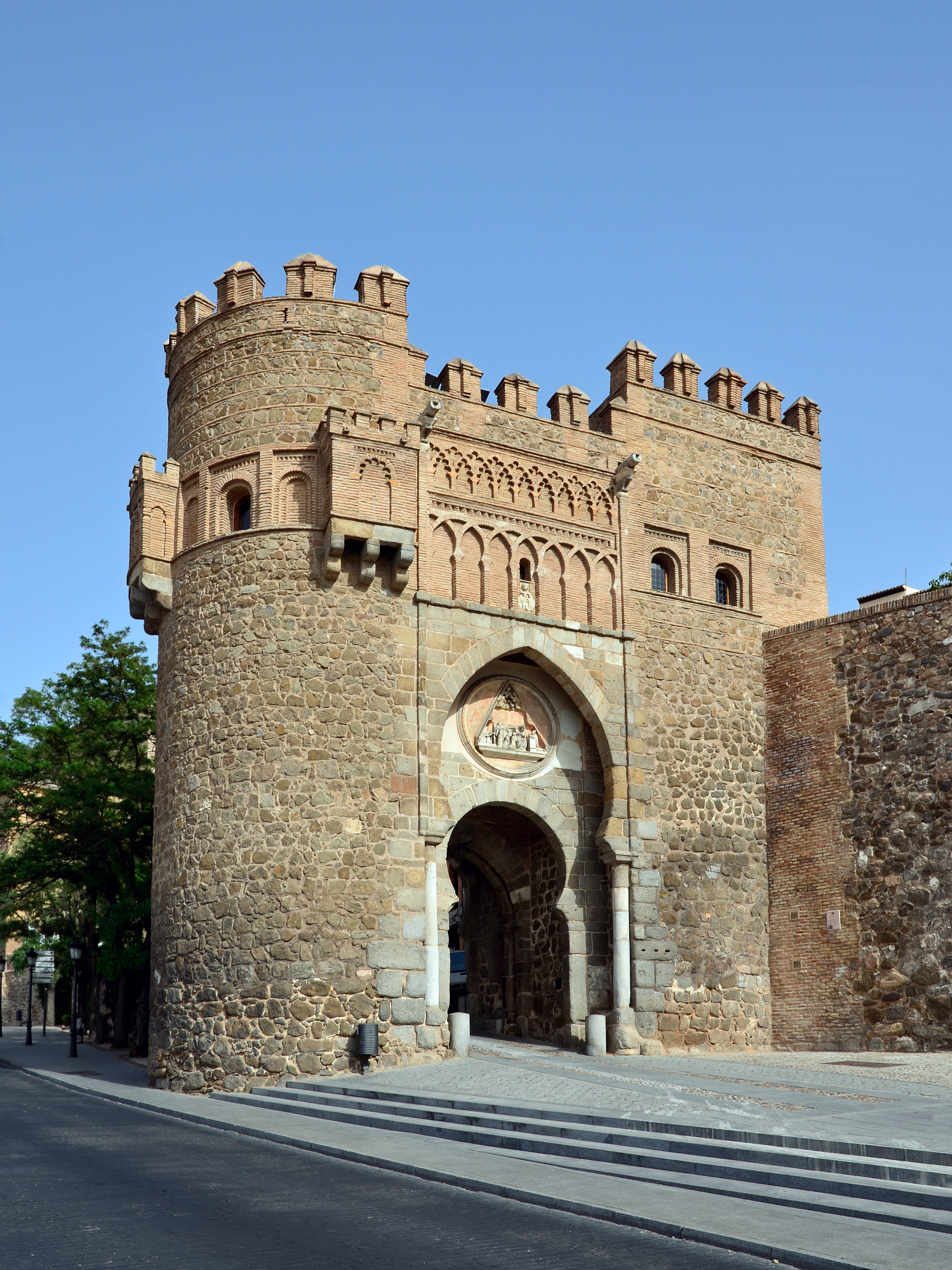
Horseshoe-shaped Puerta del Sol, Toledo

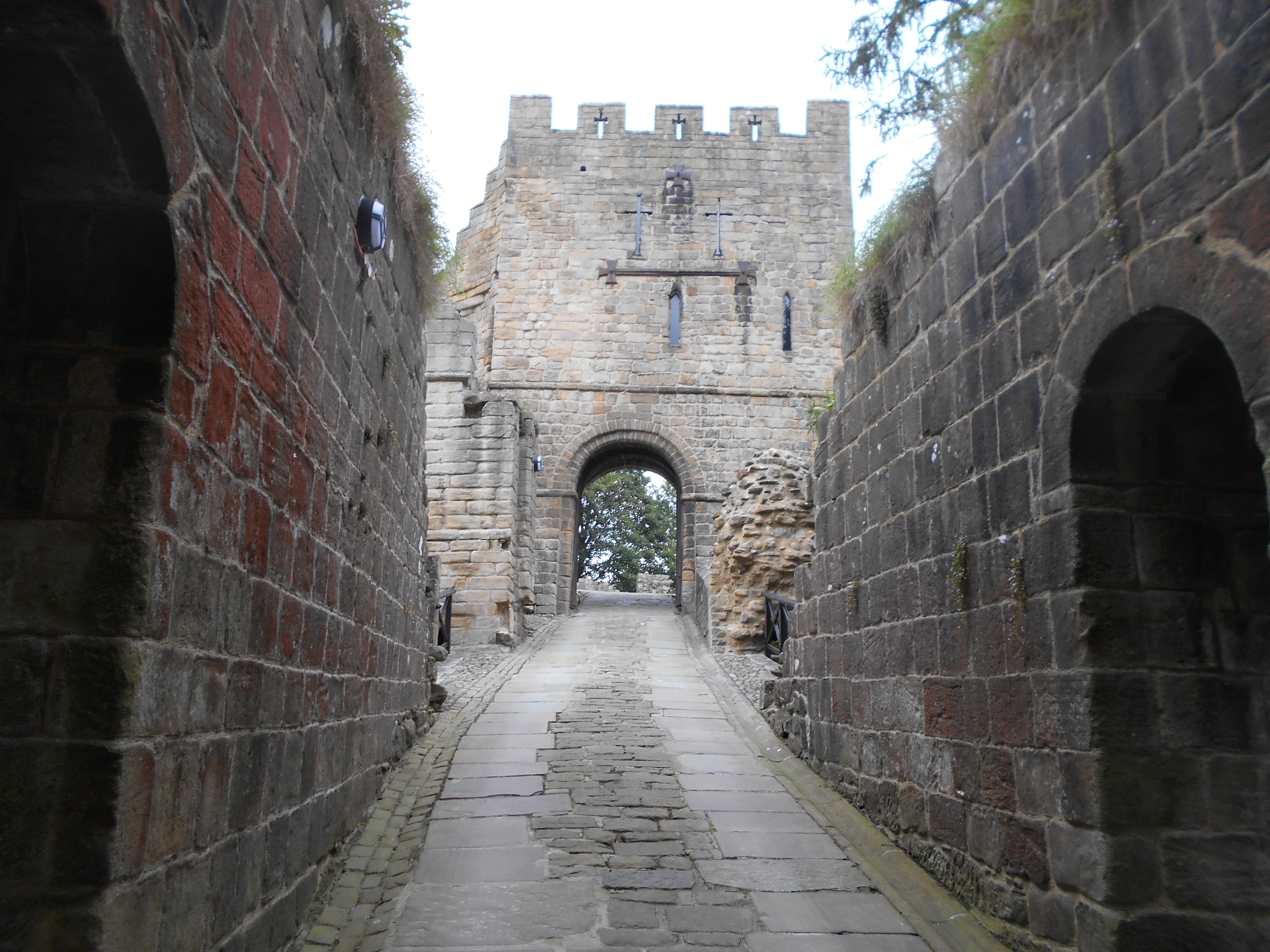
Single-towered gatehouse of Prudhoe Castle, with barbican and chapel over the passage

Early twin-towered gatehouse at Dover Castle: the Palace Gate, formerly with a barbican.

Exterior of gatehouse-keep at Tonbridge Castle

Interior of gatehouse-keep at Harlech Castle (1283-89)

Tudor display gatehouse at Layer Marney Tower

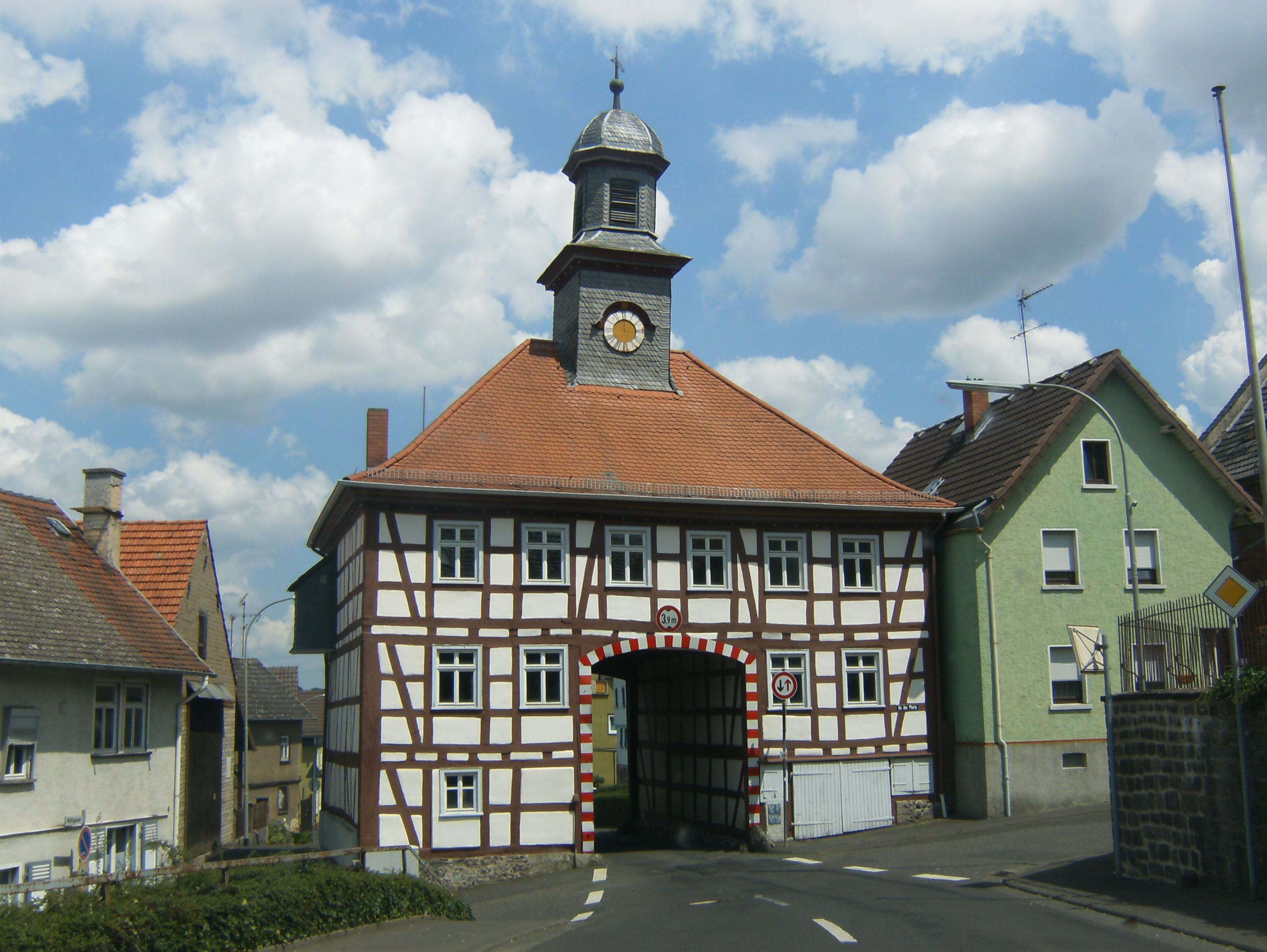
Timber-framed vernacular gatehouse in Ober-Bessingen, Lich, Germany

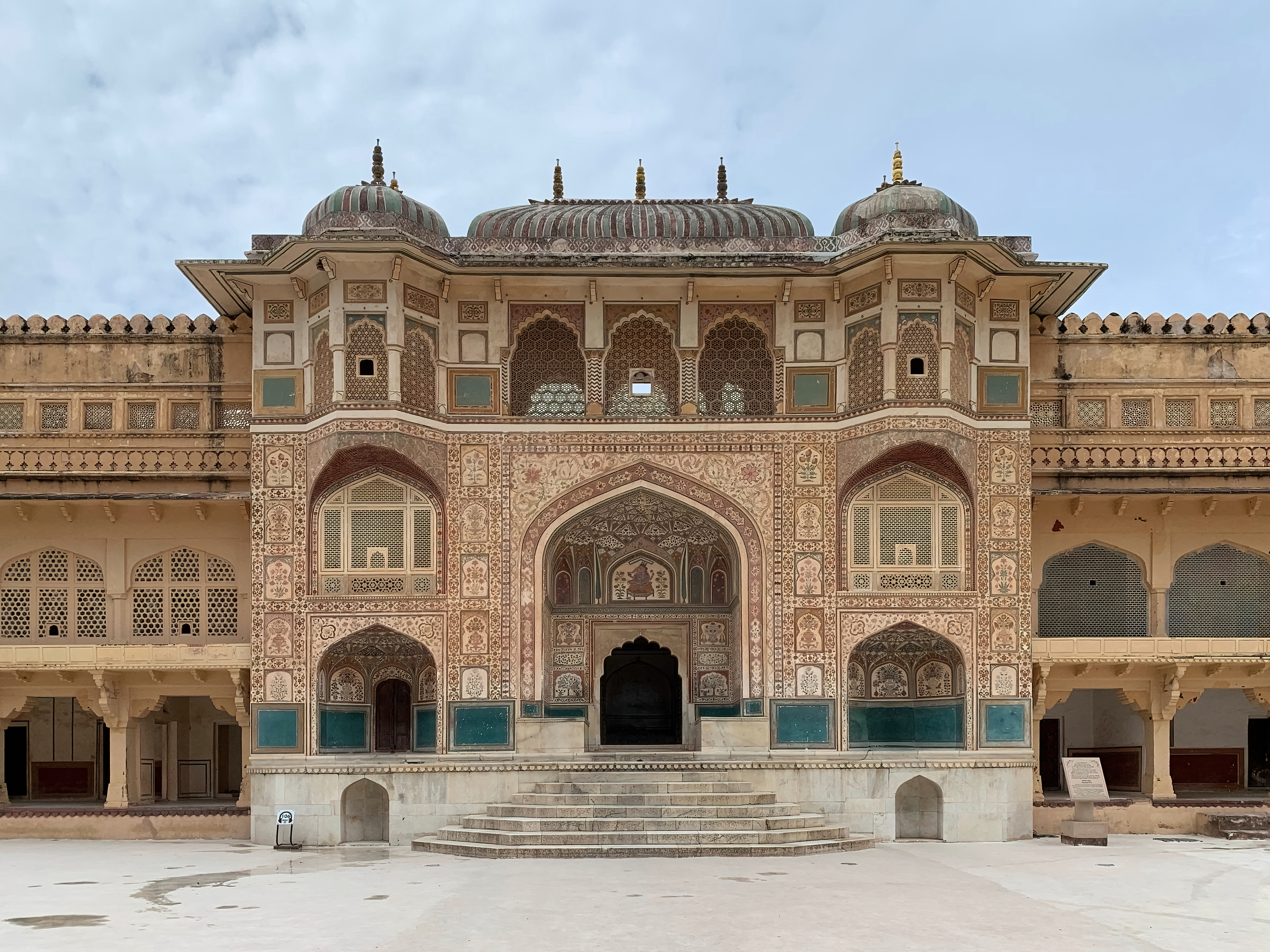
Ganesh Pol, one of seven gates of the Amber Fort, India

Kankaimon, the outer gatehouse of Shuri Castle, Japan

The 19th century Barbican Gate, Glenarm Castle, Northern Ireland

== See also ==
- Barbican
- Bridge castle
- City gate
- Guardhouse
- Gate
- Gatekeeper's lodge
- Pend
