= Hayton, Hayton and Mealo =

Village in Cumbria, England

Coordinates: 54.760°N 3.391°W

Hayton
- Village
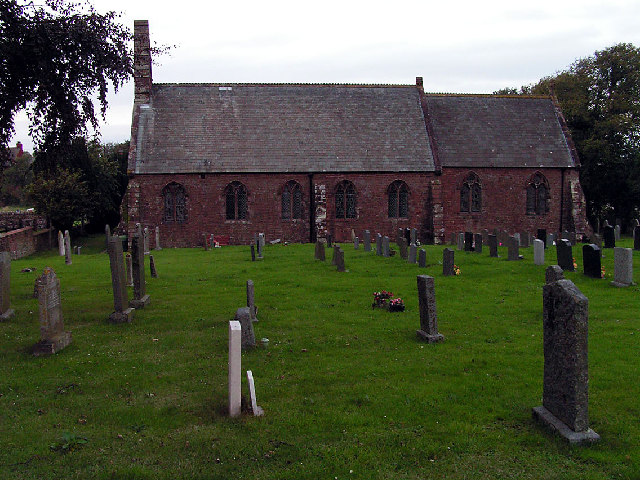
- St James' Church, Hayton

- Location in the former Allerdale district Location within Cumbria
- Population: 237 (2011)
- OS grid reference: NY 1041
- Civil parish: Hayton and Mealo
- Unitary authority: Cumberland
- Ceremonial county: Cumbria
- Region: North West
- Country: England
- Sovereign state: United Kingdom
- Post town: WIGTON
- Postcode district: CA7
- Dialling code: 016973
- Police: Cumbria
- Fire: Cumbria
- Ambulance: North West
- UK Parliament: Penrith and Solway

Hayton is a village in the Cumberland unitary authority area of Cumbria, England. It is the only settlement in the civil parish of Hayton and Mealo. Historically located in Cumberland, and on a minor road between the B5300 and the A596, it is approximately 2 miles from the coast. Nearby settlements include the town of Aspatria and the villages of Oughterside and Prospect. A small tributary called Patten Beck runs across the village, through the grounds of the castle.

== Demographics ==
In the 2011 census the Office for National Statistics (ONS) identified a "Hayton (Allerdale) Built-up area", corresponding to the village, with a population of 237 in 94 households. This figure was also the population recorded for the whole parish of Hayton and Mealo, confirming that the village is the only settlement in the parish. The built-up area was calculated to be 0.081 square miles (0.21 km^{2}), while the area of the parish is 2.919 square miles (7.559 km^{2}). The ONS identifies built-up areas algorithmically.

In the 2001 UK Census the village consisted of 89 households with a total population of 229 . The largest population was recorded in the 1921 Census when there were 346 residents within the Hayton and Mealo area. From 1921 to 1961 population gradually decreased to 214 which is likely to be due to the change in agricultural processes and the increased use of machinery which reduced the size of labourforce needed.

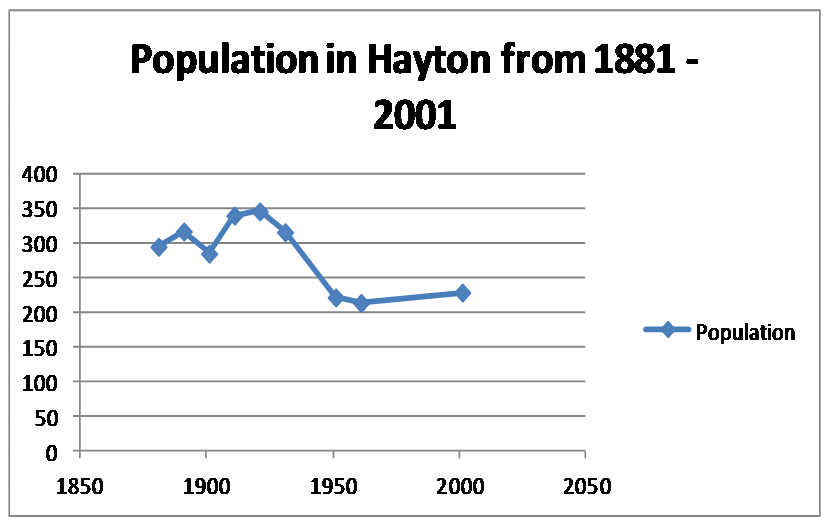
Population change in Hayton

== Amenities ==
The village does have a church. The nearest supermarket is located in the nearby town of Aspatria. The village has a bench and a postbox.

There are no schools in Hayton, however there are 10 infant schools, 7 junior schools, 46 primary schools and 9 secondary schools in the Allerdale area in the surrounding towns of Maryport, Cockermouth, Keswick and Wigton which are within a 9 – 20-mile radius of Hayton. A number of the secondary schools take students through to the age of 18 which covers A-Level studies.

== Transport ==
There is no local bus service and the nearest train station is 2.2 miles away at Aspatria. The M6 is 25 miles from the village, just beyond the city of Carisle.

== Climate ==
Due to its location on the North West coast and the mountainous geography of the area, the Lake District is the wettest region in the UK. It receives on average over 2,000mm of rainfall every year however there local variation across the region. Typically in the area surrounding Hayton, the most rainfall occurs in the months February and October; with an average of 109mm in each month. The driest month is July with an annual average of 58mm however throughout the year there is average of 18 rainy/ drizzle days per month. Annual daytime temperatures range from 7 °C in February to highs of 17 °C in June and then 9 °C in November

== History ==
To the north-east of the village lies Hayton Castle, which on 11 April 1967 was officially listed as a Grade I building.

The UK Census of 1881 gives clear indication of the main occupation of residents in Hayton and Mealo as the majority of the population was employed in agriculture. A number of farms remain, the main ones being; Hazel Mount at the bottom, south-west entrance to the village, and Grange Farm, Hayton Farm, Midtown Farm and Town Head Farm in the centre of the village.

There is also a PW – Place of Worship marked on some older maps however this building is not official named as an active place of worship but land use is clear with the gravestone visible from aerial photography.

On 22 June 1836 the Wigton Poor Law Union was established to represent 30 constituent townships and parishes of which Hayton & Mealo was included. To begin with, the new union operated in existing workhouses at Caldbeck, Oulton, Glasson and Wigton itself however in 1838 – 42, a new workhouse was constructed at Cross Lane – an 11-acre site – costing a total £323.16s.8d.

In 1870–72, John Marius Wilson's Imperial Gazetteer of England and Wales described Hayton as:

"A township and a chapelry in Aspatria parish, Cumberland; on the coast, 2½ miles W of Aspatria r. station. They have a post-office under Maryport. The township includes Mealo, and comprises 1,971 acres. Pop., 390. The chapelry was constituted in 1867. Pop., 1,095. The living is a rectory. Value, £300."

== Toponymy ==
The origins of the name lie in Saxon times; Hay meaning 'animal feeding stalls' and Ton translating to 'house or farm'. This reflects the original function and main focus of employment in the area in years past, agriculture.

== Additional Information ==
Facility	Present (Yes/No)
Public Phone Box	No
Public House	No
Village Green	yes
Village Shop	No
Village Hall	Yes Mealo
Recreational area	No
Post Box	Yes
Areas of outstanding natural beauty	Yes

== See also ==
- Listed buildings in Hayton and Mealo
