= Listed buildings in Hayton and Mealo =

Hayton and Mealo is a civil parish in the Cumberland district in Cumbria, England. It contains seven listed buildings that are recorded in the National Heritage List for England. Of these, one is listed at Grade I, the highest of the three grades, and the others are at Grade II, the lowest grade. The parish contains the village of Hayton and is otherwise rural. The listed buildings consist of a former tower house and associated structures, three houses, and a former chapel.

== Key ==
Grade	Criteria
I	Buildings of exceptional interest, sometimes considered to be internationally important
II	Buildings of national importance and special interest

== Buildings ==
Name and location	Photograph	Date	Notes	Grade
Hayton Castle; 54.76264°N 3.38426°W	—	14th century (probable)	Originally a tower house, it was enlarged in the 16th and 17th centuries, and is in sandstone on a chamfered plinth with a green slate roof. The main part has two storeys and attics, and eight bays, with the former tower at the rear forming an L-shaped plan. The doorway has a bolection architrave and a segmental pediment containing carved heads and an urn. Some of the windows are mullioned, and others are sashes, and there are hood moulds. At the rear are four gables. Inside the house medieval and 16th-century features have been retained.	I
Garden steps, Hayton Castle; 54.76254°N 3.38477°W	—	17th century	The garden steps are to the west of the house, and are in red sandstone. The steps are moulded and form a segmental flight.	II
Stable block, Hayton Castle; 54.76295°N 3.38451°W	—	Late 17th century	The stables were altered in the 19th century. The block is in sandstone with a green slate roof, and has two storeys and four bays, with a lower single-bay extension to the right. The stables contain doorways, loft doors, and external steps leading up to a loft door.	II
The Old Post Office; 54.75954°N 3.39078°W	—	Late 17th century	The house was altered in the 19th century. It is in sandstone with a greenslate roof. The house has two storeys and four bays, the right two bays projecting forward as an outshut. The doorway has an architrave, most of the windows are casements, and there is also a shop window. Inside the house is an inglenook and a curved bressumer.	II
Blackburn House; 54.75972°N 3.38918°W	—	Early 19th century	The house is in sandstone on a chamfered plinth, with quoins, a moulded parapet, and a hipped green slate roof. It has two storeys, four bays, a doorway with pilasters, and a fanlight, and sash windows.	II
Mealo House; 54.76042°N 3.43261°W	—	Early 19th century	A stuccoed farmhouse on a chamfered plinth with quoins, an eaves cornice, and a green slate roof. It has two storeys and three bays with single-bay wings on each side. There is a 20th-century porch and sash windows. In the left wing is a gabled dormer.	II
Former Congregational Chapel; 54.75928°N 3.39240°W		1844	The chapel has been converted for domestic use. It is rendered with angle pilasters and has a green slate roof. There is a single storey and two bays. The doorway has a fanlight with a pilastered surround, and the windows have pointed heads. Between the windows is an inscribed plaque.	II
