= Hayton and Mealo =

Civil parish in Cumbria, England

Coordinates: 54.760°N 3.388°W

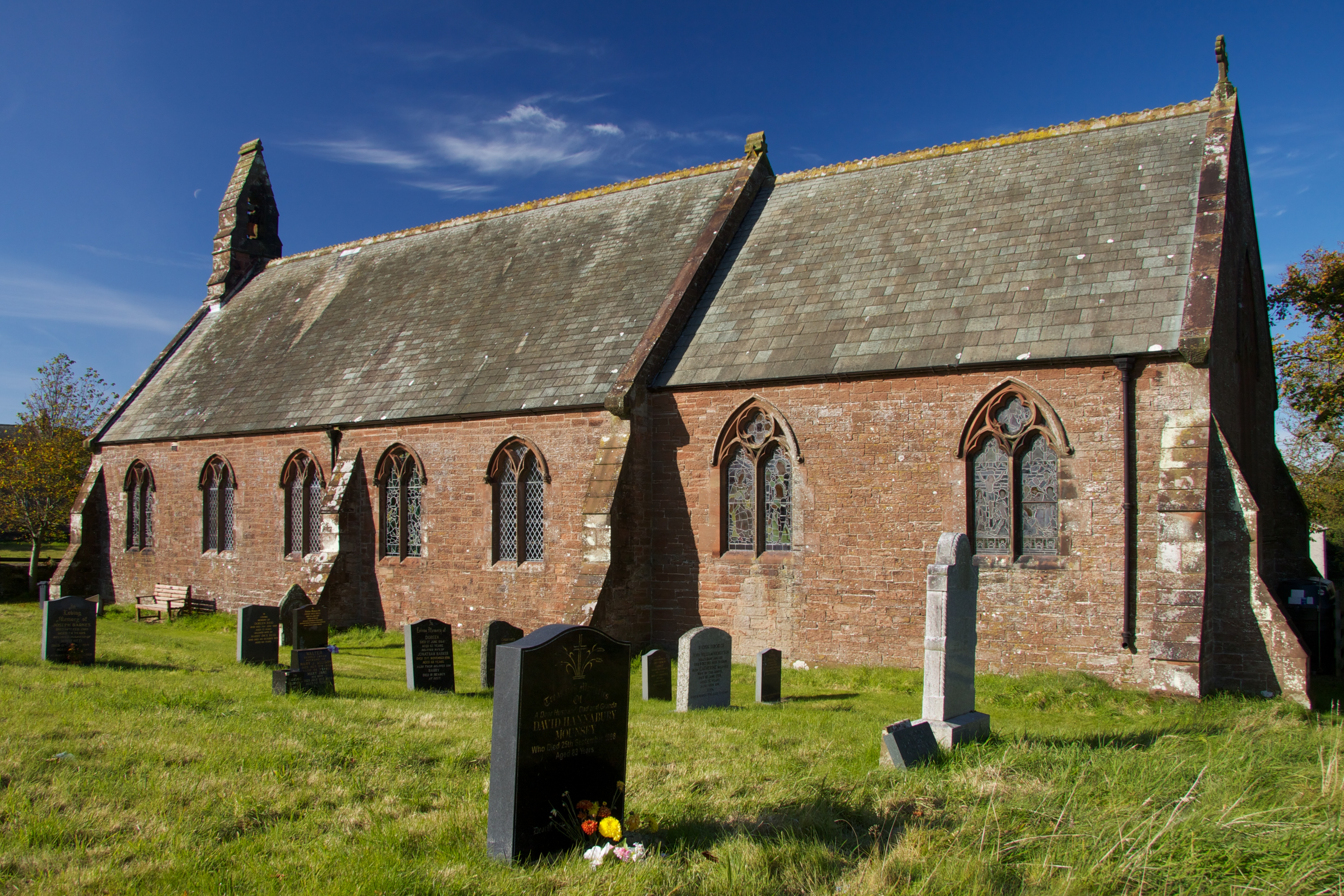
- St James's Church, Hayton

- Location within Cumbria
- Population: 217 (Parish, 2021)
- OS grid reference: NY1041
- Civil parish: Hayton and Mealo
- Unitary authority: Cumberland
- Ceremonial county: Cumbria
- Region: North West
- Country: England
- Sovereign state: United Kingdom
- Post town: WIGTON
- Postcode district: CA7
- Police: Cumbria
- Fire: Cumbria
- Ambulance: North West
- UK Parliament: Penrith and Solway

Hayton and Mealo is a civil parish in the Cumberland district, Cumbria. The main settlement is Hayton, a village in the centre of the parish. Mealo is an area to the west of the parish, on the coast south of Allonby.

The parish has an area of 2.9 square miles (7.6 km^{2}). The western boundary of the parish is a short stretch of coastline south of Allonby; working clockwise it is then bordered by Allonby parish to the north, Westnewton to the north east, Aspatria to the east and Oughterside and Allerby to the south. The B5300 road runs along the western edge of the parish, on the coast, and the A596 road from Aspatria to Maryport runs just outside the parish's south eastern boundary.

== History ==
The Manor of Hayton was held by the Musgrave family from about 1500 until the early 19th century, when it passed to the Hylton and Jolliffe family through marriage.

Hayton and Mealo was historically one of four townships within the ancient parish of Aspatria, in the historic county of Cumberland. From the 17th century onwards, parishes were gradually given various civil functions under the poor laws, in addition to their original ecclesiastical functions. In some cases, including Aspatria, the civil functions were exercised by each township separately rather than the parish as a whole. In 1866, the legal definition of 'parish' was changed to be the areas used for administering the poor laws, and so Hayton and Mealo became a civil parish.

St James's church was built in 1868 at Hayton and given an ecclesiastical parish covering both the Hayton and Mealo and neighbouring Oughterside and Allerby civil parishes.

== Governance ==
There are two tiers of local government covering Hayton and Mealo, at parish and unitary authority level: Hayton and Mealo Parish Council and Cumberland Council. Its archives 1997-2013 are held at the Carlisle Archive Centre. The parish is in the parliamentary constituency of Penrith and Solway.

== Demography ==
At the 2021 census, the parish had a population of 217. The population had been 237 in the 2011 census. In 1848, its population was 378.

== Listed buildings ==
There are seven listed buildings in the parish, including the Grade I listed Hayton Castle.
