= Sir Edward Musgrave, 1st Baronet =

English Baronet & Civil War Royalist

Sir Edward Musgrave, 1st Baronet (1621 – 22 November 1673), was one of the Musgrave Baronets of Hayton Castle.

== Early life ==
In 1621, Sir Edward was born at Hayton Castle in Cumberland, England to Dr. William Musgrave (1585-1634) and Lady Catherine Sherbourne (1589-1649).

He married Mary Graham, daughter of Sir Richard Graham, 1st Baronet of Esk and Netherby, and together they had four children: Jane, Francis, Richard and William. Of note, his eldest daughter became Lady Jane (1643-1677) when she married Sir Wilfrid Lawson, 1st Baronet, of Isell.

Upon the death of his father, Sir William the title and estates, including Hayton Castle, passed to Sir Edward as eldest son.

== English Civil War ==
As of 1638, Sir Edward Musgrave, 1st baronet of Nova Scotia was an ardent Royalist. During the English Civil War, he spared neither person nor fortune, heavily investing both of his own accord. He maintained a regiment of horse at his personal expense.

In 1648, he served as a Colonel in the Battle of Preston.

In 1651, at the Battle of Worcester, when the horse of King Charles II was shot from under him, Sir Edward dismounted and supplied the King with his own horse, thus allowing him to escape.

After defeat, Musgrave found refuge in Scotland with the Duke of Gordon. Wanted by Parliament, when his refuge was discovered, Cromwell informed the Duke that “if he did not forthwith deliver up Ned Musgrave he would send a troop of horse to storm his castle.” Musgrave escaped and fled to the Isle of Man.

Sir Edward Musgrave died on 22 November 1673 at Hayton Castle. Upon his death, the title passed to his eldest son, Sir Richard Musgrave (1645-1710).

== Bibliography ==
- R. S. Ferguson (1871). Cumberland & Westmorland M.P.'s From The Restoration To The Reform Bill Of 1867 (1660–1867). Carlisle.
- T. Bulmer (1901). History and Directory of Cumberland. Preston: T. Bulmer & Co. Hesperus Press Ltd.

Baronetage of Nova Scotia
New creation	Baronet (of Hayton Castle); 1638–1673	Succeeded by Richard Musgrave
