= Baron Hylton =

Barony in the Peerage of the United Kingdom

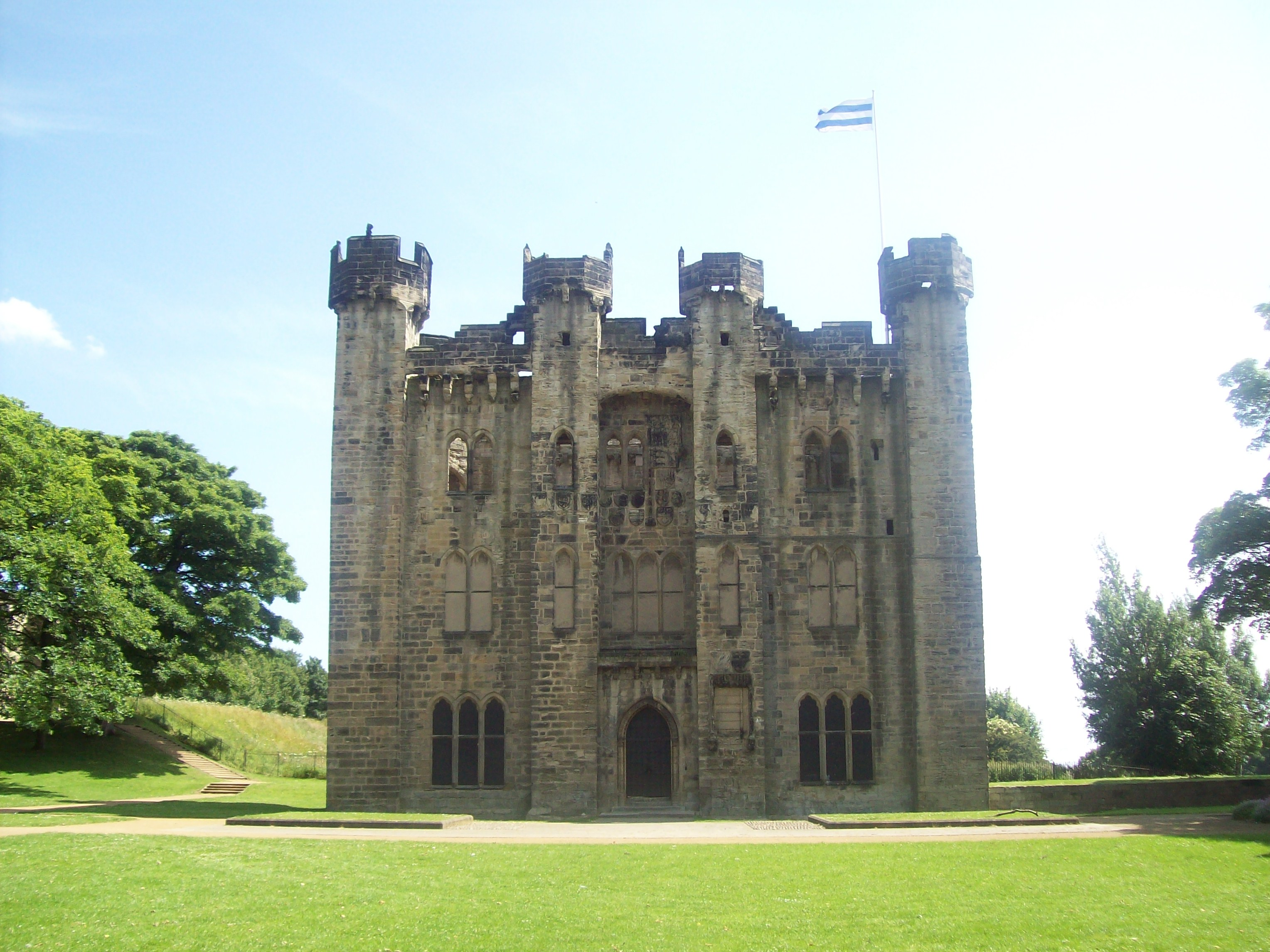
Hylton Castle, the seat of the Hylton family

Baron Hylton is a title that has been created twice, once in the Peerage of England and once in the Peerage of the United Kingdom. The first creation (Note: First creations also spelt Baron Hilton (C.R. 1993).) came in the Peerage of England 1295 when Robert Hylton was summoned to the Model Parliament as Lord Hylton by writ. His son, Alexander, was called to Parliament in 1332 and 1335, but no further summons were sent for his descendants. Therefore, the title has only been held de jure after the death of the second baron. Indeed, the last baron was Member of Parliament for Carlisle after "inheriting" the title, due to this anomaly. Despite this, the creation is deemed to have fallen into abeyance on the death of the eighteenth baron without male heirs in 1746.

The second creation came in the Peerage of the United Kingdom in 1866 when the soldier and Conservative politician, Sir William Jolliffe, 1st Baronet, was made Baron Hylton of Hylton, Sunderland in the County Palatine of Durham and of Petersfield in the County of Southampton. He had already been created a Baronet, of Merstham in the County of Surrey, in 1821. He was the grandson of William Jolliffe (for many years Member of Parliament for Petersfield), and a co-heir of the original barony of Hylton through his grandmother Eleanor (the wife of William Jolliffe), daughter of Anne Hylton, sister of the eighteenth Baron of the 1295 creation.

Lord Hylton was succeeded by his second son, the second Baron. He notably represented Wells in the House of Commons as a Conservative. His son, the third Baron, also represented Wells in Parliament as a Conservative and after entering the House of Lords notably served as Captain of the Yeomen of the Guard from 1918 to 1924. His son, the fourth Baron, was Lord Lieutenant of Somerset from 1949 to 1964. As of 2017 the titles are held by the latter's eldest son, the fifth Baron. He is one of the ninety elected hereditary peers who remained in the House of Lords after the House of Lords Act of 1999. Lord Hylton sat as a cross-bencher until retiring in July 2023.

The principal seat of the Hylton family was Hylton Castle, Sunderland, with a subsidiary property at Ammerdown House, near Kilmersdon, Somerset.

== Barons Hylton (1295) ==
- Robert Hylton, 1st Baron Hylton (d. 1322)
- Alexander Hylton, 2nd Baron Hylton (d. 1360)
- Robert Hylton, de jure 3rd Baron Hylton (1340–1377)
- Sir William Hylton, de jure 4th Baron Hylton (1356–1435)
- Sir Robert Hylton, de jure 5th Baron Hylton (1385–1447)
- William Hylton, de jure 6th Baron Hylton (d. 1457)
- Sir William Hylton, de jure 7th Baron Hylton (1451–1500)
- Sir William Hylton, de jure 8th Baron Hylton (d. 1535)
- Sir Thomas Hylton, de jure 9th Baron Hylton (d. 1560)
- Sir William Hylton, de jure 10th Baron Hylton (c. 1510–1565)
- Sir William Hylton, de jure 11th Baron Hylton (d. 1600)
- Henry Hylton, de jure 12th Baron Hylton (1586–1641)
- Robert Hylton, de jure 13th Baron Hylton (d. 1641), brother of Henry
- John Hylton, de jure 14th Baron Hylton (d. 1655)
- John Hylton, de jure 15th Baron Hylton (1628–1670)
- Henry Hylton, de jure 16th Baron Hylton (1637–1712)
- Richard Hylton, de jure 17th Baron Hylton (d. 1722)
- John Hylton, de jure 18th Baron Hylton (1699–1746) (abeyant)

== Barons Hylton (1866) ==
- William George Hylton Jolliffe, 1st Baron Hylton (1800–1876)
- Hedworth Hylton Jolliffe, 2nd Baron Hylton (1829–1899)
- Hylton George Hylton Jolliffe, 3rd Baron Hylton (1862–1945)
- William George Hervey Jolliffe, 4th Baron Hylton (1898–1967)
- Raymond Hervey Jolliffe, 5th Baron Hylton (b. 1932)

The heir apparent is the present holder's son Hon. William Henry Martin Jolliffe (b. 1967)
The heir apparent's heir apparent is his son Joseph William Charles Jolliffe (b. 2016)

== See also ==
- Hylton Castle
- William Jolliffe

Baronetage of the United Kingdom
Preceded by Pocock baronets	Jolliffe baronets of Merstham; 20 August 1821	Succeeded by Townsend-Farquhar baronets
