= Hayton Castle =

Castle in Hayton, Cumbria, England

Coordinates: 54.762593°N 3.384152°W

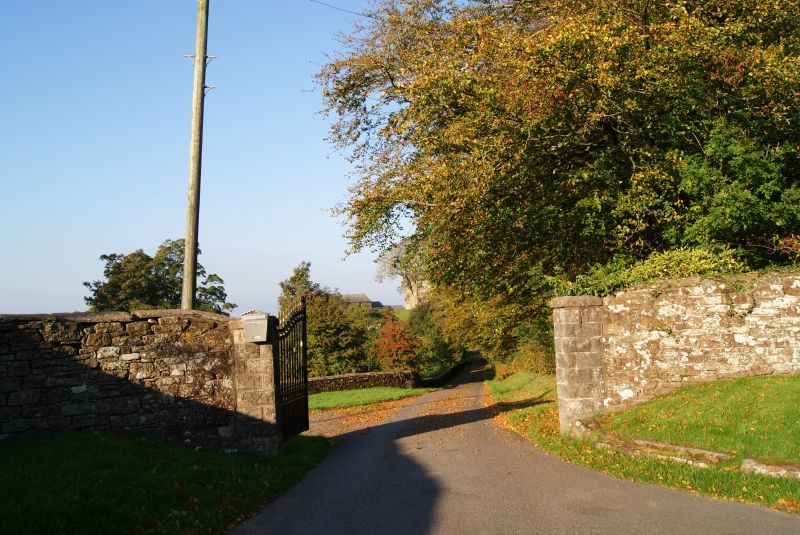
Hayton Castle gates

Hayton Castle is a fortified house situated to the North-East of the village of Hayton in Cumbria.

== Preface ==
The castle is a 14th- or 15th-century tower house; extended in the 16th and 17th centuries and converted into a house. Hayton Castle is a simple rectangular house, with windows from three periods – 15th Century, Elizabethan and Georgian. There are very thick walls, and there's a barrel vault in the basement – indicating a fortified house. During the 17th century it was occupied by a branch of the Musgrave family. It was officially designated as a Grade I listed building on 11 April 1967.

== History ==
Hayton Castle is the centre of a small manor within the baronetcy of Allerdale, whose families have featured prominently in the history of Cumberland. The manor of Hayton was originally granted by Alan, second Lord of Allerdale, to his huntsman Seliff, whose descendants in consequence assumed the name De Hayton.

From the Hayton's, this manor passed by a succession of female heirs to Robert de Mulcaster, through his marriage to an heiress of the powerful Lucy family. William de Mulcaster, son of Robert, was High Sheriff of Cumberland for two periods between 1298 and 1306, and various members of that family appear to have been Knights of the shire of Cumberland during the 14th century. This line possessed the manor for five generations, but through the failure of the male issue it passed to Piers Jeffrey Tilliol, by his marriage to the heiress. Piers had two daughters Isabella and Margaret. Isabella, who received Hayton, married John Colville of Torpenhow. Colville died in 1438 and his line came to an end in 1479, once more with two daughters, who both married younger sons of Sir Thomas Musgrave (1417–1469) of Hartley Castle.

It was from this marriage of Margaret Colville and Nicholas Musgrave (1450–1506), fourth son of Sir Thomas, that sprang the line through which the manor was handed down for fourteen generations, lasting about 300 years. He was succeeded by Thomas Musgrave, Marshal of Berwick (1483–1532). His son William Musgrave, MP, of Hayton (1518–1597) inherited the estate. He was succeeded by Sir Edward Musgrave, MP (1561–1641). His son William (1596–1634) was the next to inherit the estate, followed by his son Edward. Sir Edward Musgrave, 1st Baronet of Hayton Castle (1621–1676) was made a baronet of Nova Scotia in 1638. He was succeeded by his son Sir Richard Musgrave, 2nd Baronet (1650–1710). Upon his death the estate fell to his son and heir, Sir Richard Musgrave, 3rd Baronet (1675–1711). He was a Member of Parliament for the Cumberland constituency in 1701 and 1702–1708. After his death the estate passed to Sir Richard Musgrave 4th Baronet (170–1739). Sir Richard Musgrave 5th Baronet (1724–1755), took the name of Hylton, pursuant to the will of his uncle, John Hylton of Hilton Castle, and dying without issue, the title went to his brother, Sir William Musgrave 6th Baronet (1735–1800), a commissioner of the customs. After William's death the title went to his younger brother Sir Thomas Musgrave 7th Baronet (1737–1812), a general in the British Army. Thomas was succeeded by a distant cousin, Sir James Musgrave, 8th Baronet of Barnsley Park, Gloucestershire. Sir James Musgrave died in 1814, and was succeeded by his son, Sir James Musgrave, 9th Baronet (1785–1858). The manor of Hayton did not accompany the title, and shortly afterwards it became the property of Mrs. Jolliffe (relative of William Jolliffe, Esq. M. P. for Petersfield, who died in 1802), the younger daughter, and eventually sole heiress of Sir Richard Musgrave Bart. The Joliffe family did not live at the castle preferring to lease it as a tenant farm. Among past tenant farmers since that time we find, the Reverend Isaac Robinson, 1916; John Blackburn and his son 1828; John Blackstock, Nancy his widow 1882; Thomas Biglands, a well-known sportsman, tenant until 1903, when the property was purchased by David Mitchell, whose family retain the property today. Mitchell came from Scotland, having recently returned from South Africa, where he had served in the British Army for three years during the Anglo Boer War.

== Description ==
One should assume that no building of any great importance existed at Hayton before the rise of the Mulcaster family. Sir Piers de Tilliol apparently preferred to live at Scaleby and as such left no mark at Hayton, leaving most of the building and alterations which gave the castle its present-day appearance to the Musgrave family. Today the building is a rectangle measuring about 29 metres from North to South and 16 metres from East to West. The north end is the best preserved, and most of the extensive alterations have been carried out at the south end. The most curious feature of the main fabric is a 2-metre thick wall in the centre of the building, probably a survivor of the original castle. Hayton Castle is one of several places in Cumberland which offered hospitality to Mary, Queen of Scots and it is said that she spent a night here on 17 May 1568. On leaving she presented her host with a miniature painting of herself, forming the centre of a plain gold ring, a treasure that passed through many generations. She is said however to have spent the same night at Cockermouth.

The old manorial residence has come down from its former high estate and now serves the purpose of a farm house. However it still bears reminders of its illustrious past. There are three staircases within the castle, the main stairway is made of stone and at the first turn, situated in the wall, is the Musgrave shield. It contains six annulets, three, two and one with a martlet below the three, while parallel is seen the bend raguly on a field gules, of the Penruddock family of Arkelby, a branch of the old lords of Penruddock. The coat of arms was probably erected by Sir Edward Musgrave, who married Catherine, daughter of Sir Thomas Penruddock of Arkelby and Exeter. Sir Edward's mother was a Martindale, hence the arms outside. The annulet is the cadency device of their fifth son, while the martlet is that of the fourth son. The crest of the Musgrave's consists of two arms in armour, hands gauntleted proper and grasping an annulet which may represent Hylton. The stone slab bears the legend LAVS. TIBI. DNE REX .GL. ORIE. (Praise to Thee, O God, the King of Glory). The arms follow, the crest piercing the space between the first and second and third and fourth words above given. Then follows the date AD 1609, and the words:- PRECOR. VT.SIMVS. MEMORES. BENEFICI ORUM. ERGA. NOS. The petitioner entreats the King of Kings out of his love to be mindful of himself and family and to show his favour towards them. A second spiral stone staircase, which is evidently a remnant of a long flight of stairs ascending from the floor to roof is a slab relating to the existence of a domestic chapel that once existed somewhere below. This slab in an old window in the east wall bears the following inscription:-

“This chapel was repaired at the proper cost of Ann Musgrave, third daughter of Sir Richard Musgrave, Baronet, and Dame Dorothy, his wife, in ye year Anno Domini, 1719.”

According to some observers this refers to an oratory in the castle itself. Alternatively it is said that formerly there was a chapel adjacent to the castle, and that the inscription refers o a restoration of the building. It is said that this same chapel was in use till 1820, when it was dismantled and rapidly fell in decay. No trace of it now remains. While above the 17th century fireplace is another example of the Musgrave arms thought to have been erected by Anne Musgrave daughter of Sir Richard and his wife Dorothy. On an outside wall, the north wall, is the coat of arms of Martindale or Mulcaster, viz., Argent and gules, with a bend sable. In the garden is a stone sundial bearing the initials of Sir Richard, son of Sir Edward, and Anne his wife with a date of 1725.

== English Civil War ==
The English Civil War did not deal kindly with Hayton Castle or its owners. Sir Edward Musgrave, created a baronet of Nova Scotia in 1638 was an ardent Royalist, and spared neither his person nor his fortune in this cause. He maintained a regiment of horse at his own expense and in 1648, with the rank of colonel took part in the Battle of Preston. and it is recorded that when, at the Battle of Worcester, the horse of King Charles II was shot from under him, Sir Edward dismounted and supplied the King with his own horse. After the defeat Musgrave found refuge in Scotland with the Duke of Gordon, and so badly was he wanted by the Parliament that when his refuge was discovered Cromwell informed the Duke that “if he did not forthwith deliver up Ned Musgrave he would send a troop of horse to storm his castle”. Musgrave was allowed to escape and he fled to the Isle of Man where he afterwards died. Hayton Castle received considerable damage from the Parliamentary forces. The south end, the most vulnerable, came off worse as after the war was over; this portion was entirely rebuilt by Sir Edward's son Richard. Hayton Castle is one of several places in Cumberland which offered hospitality to Mary, Queen of Scots and it is said that she spent a night here on 17 May 1568. On leaving she presented her host with a miniature painting of herself, forming the centre of a plain gold ring, a treasure that passed through many generations. She is said however to have spent the same night at Cockermouth.

== See also ==
- Grade II* listed buildings in Cumberland
- Listed buildings in Hayton and Mealo

== Bibliography ==
- A. D. Mills (1998). Oxford Dictionary of Place-Names. Oxford: Oxford.
- T. Bulmer (1901). History and Directory of Cumberland. Preston: T. Bulmer & Co. Hesperus Press Ltd.
- J. B. Bailey (1920). History of the Churches in the Maryport Rural Deanery. Cockermouth: Times Office.
- J. Rose; M. Dunglinson (1987). Aspatria. Chichester: Phillimore.
- Oxford (1992). Concise Dictionary of National Biography Volume II (G-M). Oxford: Oxford.
