= Oughterside =

Village in Cumbria, England

Coordinates: 54.753159°N 3.374470°W

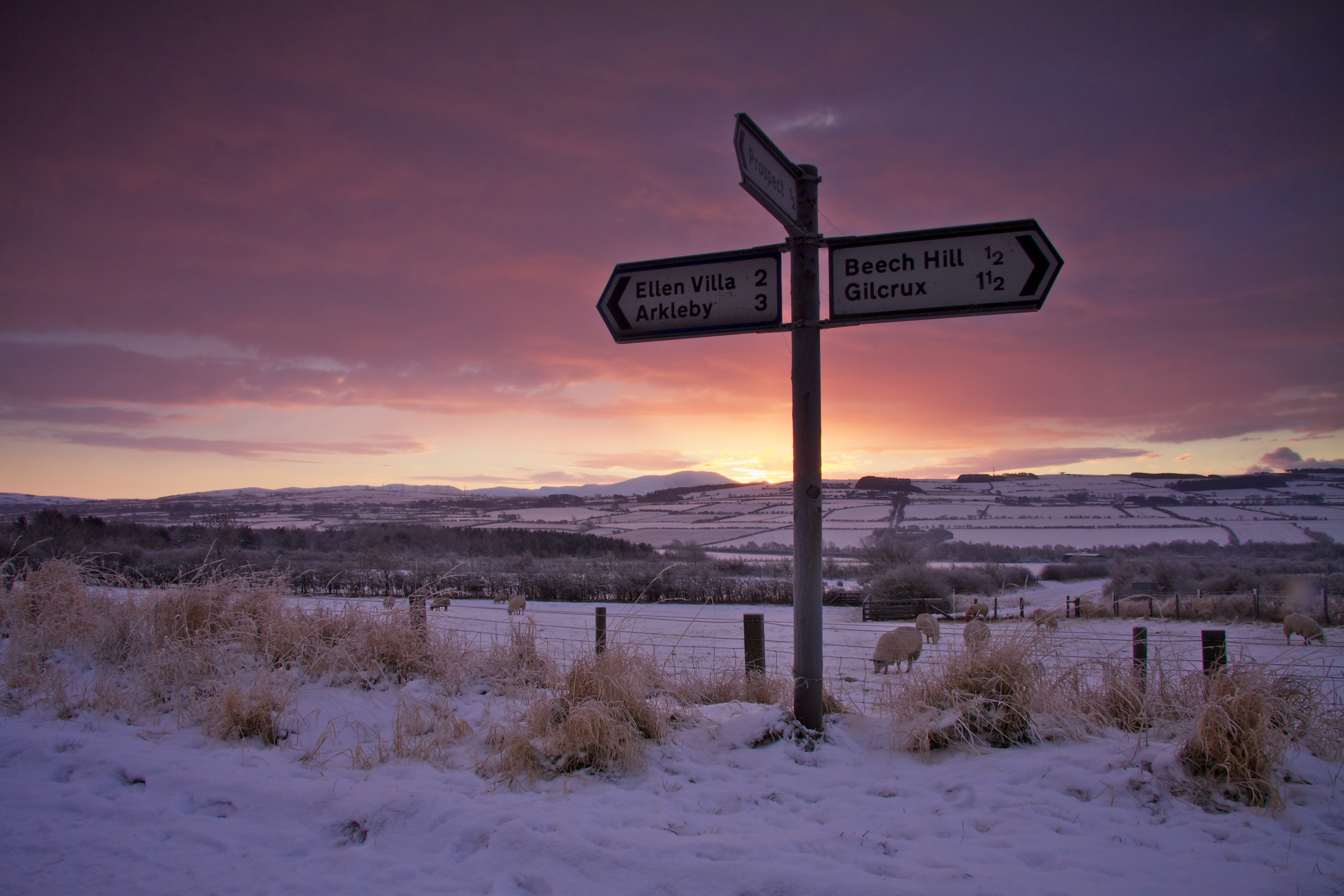
- Signpost at the east end of the main road

- Location in Allerdale, Cumbria Location within Cumbria
- Population: 619 (2011)
- OS grid reference: NY1163640668
- Civil parish: Oughterside and Allerby
- Unitary authority: Cumberland
- Ceremonial county: Cumbria
- Region: North West
- Country: England
- Sovereign state: United Kingdom
- Post town: WIGTON
- Postcode district: CA7
- Dialling code: 016973
- Police: Cumbria
- Fire: Cumbria
- Ambulance: North West
- UK Parliament: Penrith and Solway

Oughterside is a village in the Cumberland district of the English county of Cumbria. Nearby settlements include the town of Aspatria and the villages of Hayton and Prospect. For transport there is the A596 road nearby. Oughterside is 2.1 miles away from Aspatria and is 6 miles from Cockermouth, the birthplace of William Wordsworth. Carlisle is the closest city to Oughterside that offers transport links to other locations across the UK through the railway network. Oughterside is located on the North Western edge of the Lake District.

== Population ==
The population of the village is 626. In the 1920s Oughterside saw a vast increase in employment as many coal mines opened. Employment figures had almost doubled from 1914, when 339 men worked in the mines to 667 in 1923. Little Main and Ten Quarters mine seemed to be the most used mines with a vast decline in employment figures after the mines being abandoned in 1930. Other mines included Metal Band, Thirty Inch and Yard Band. However, during this time the population of the Allerdale district fell, this may well be due to the two world wars, with men going off to join the army.

In recent years the Allerdale district has seen a population decrease, although it has been steady for twenty years, the graph shows a small rise then a fall, but on average the Allerdale district has had an average population 950,000 since the 1940s. This late flux could be due to its location, over time, being a rural place older people may move here to settle away from the busy urban cities, whereas the younger generations move away to urban settlements in search of employment. The availability of jobs, such as the mining industry saw a decline in population in the early 1900s and during the war time period. Many jobs have turned from agricultural to city workers, thus many people have moved away to urban areas at this time and men had gone off to fight in battle.

== History ==
In Oughterside in 1861 the population was 705, however 141 houses were inhabited In the 1911 census, it was recorded that the population had since dropped to 559 The History of coal mining in Aspatria the civil parish in which Oughterside is located dates back to 1902 when the sinking started. Owned by the Oughterside Coal Co.(1928) Ltd. Outputs from the mines came in the 1914s and ran through until the early 1930s. Perhaps linked with the war, the coal mines were used to produce coal to fuel the country. Thomas Stanley Durham was the manager from 1914 to 1921 with over 300 employees working above and below the ground. J. G. Scoular took over as manager for the next couple of years until in 1923 when the Bullgill company took over, producing an annual output of 100,000 tons of coal used for Coking, Household and Steam.
