= Oughterside and Allerby =

Civil parish in Cumbria, England

Coordinates: 54.754°N 3.375°W

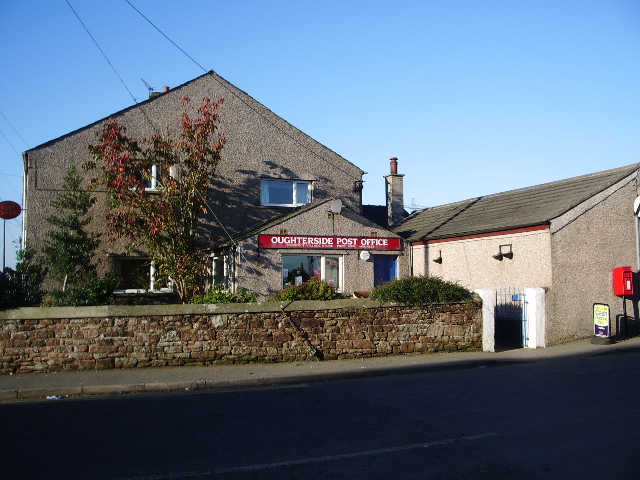
- Oughterside Post Office, in Prospect

- Location within Cumbria
- Population: 631 (Parish, 2021)
- OS grid reference: NY1140
- Civil parish: Oughterside and Allerby
- Unitary authority: Cumberland
- Ceremonial county: Cumbria
- Region: North West
- Country: England
- Sovereign state: United Kingdom
- Post town: WIGTON
- Postcode district: CA7
- Police: Cumbria
- Fire: Cumbria
- Ambulance: North West
- UK Parliament: Penrith and Solway

Oughterside and Allerby is a civil parish in the Cumberland district of Cumbria, England. The main settlements in the parish are Allerby in the west and Oughterside and Prospect, in the east. The north western boundary of the parish is a short stretch of coast, then, working clockwise, the parish is bordered by Hayton and Mealo to the north, Aspatria to the north east, Plumbland to the south east, Gilcrux to the south and Crosscanonby to the south west. The A596 road from Aspatria to Maryport passes through the parish, and the B5300 road follows its coastline in the north west.

== History ==
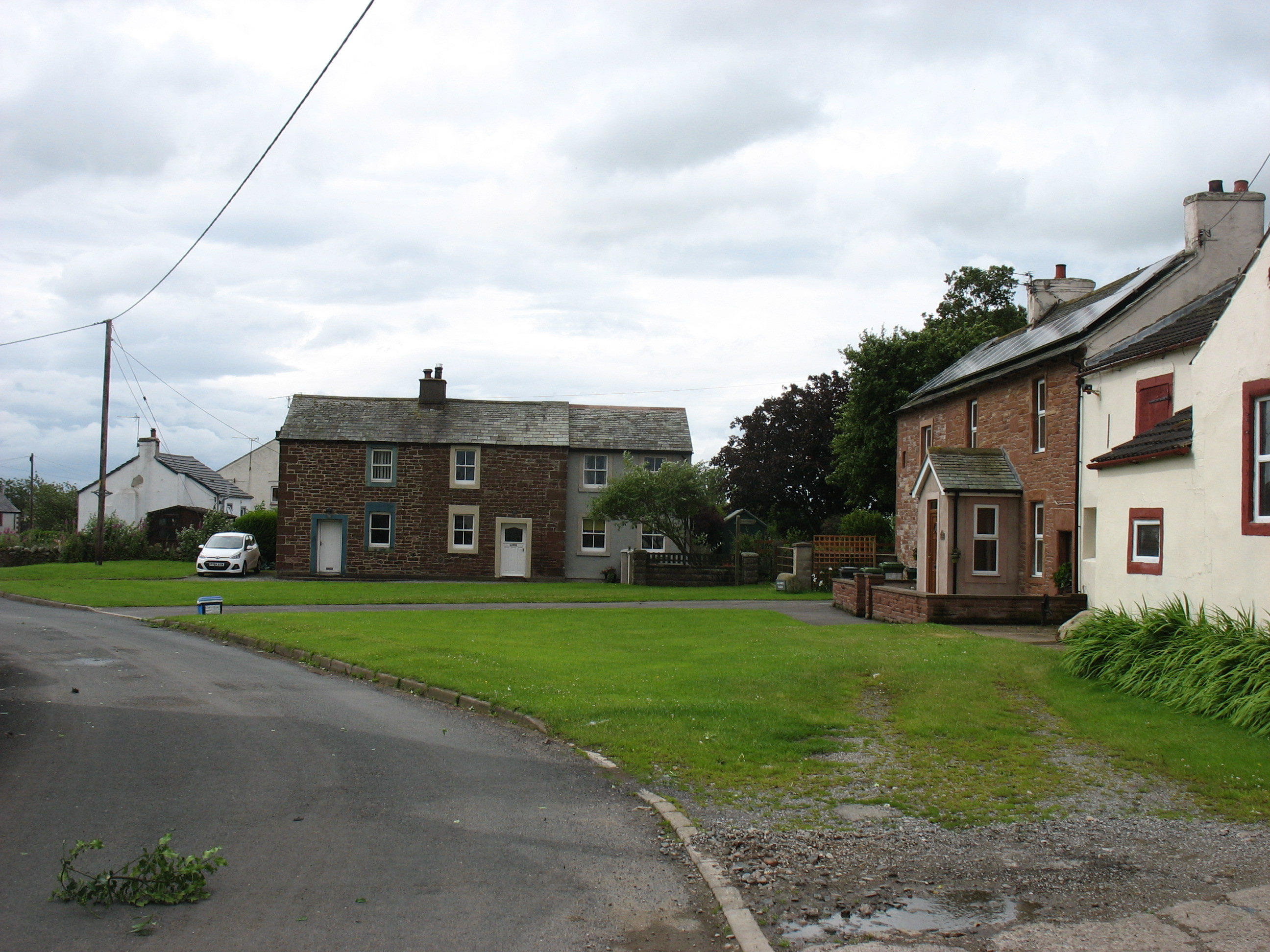
Allerby village

Oughterside and Allerby was historically one of four townships within the ancient parish of Aspatria, in the historic county of Cumberland. From the 17th century onwards, parishes were gradually given various civil functions under the poor laws, in addition to their original ecclesiastical functions. In some cases, including Aspatria, the civil functions were exercised by each township separately rather than the parish as a whole. In 1866, the legal definition of 'parish' was changed to be the areas used for administering the poor laws, and so Oughterside and Allerby became a civil parish.

== Governance ==
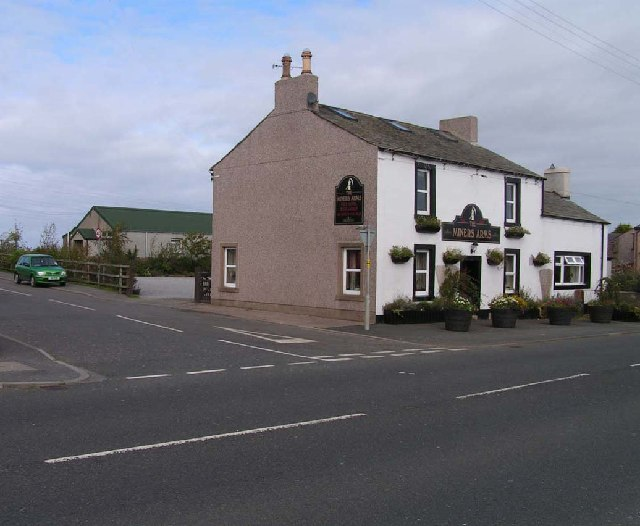
Miners Arms and Village Hall, Prospect

There are two tiers of local government covering Oughterside and Allerby, at parish and unitary authority level: Hayton and Mealo Parish Council and Cumberland Council. The parish council meets at the village hall in Prospect.

Oughterside and Allerby is in the parliamentary constituency of Penrith and Solway.

== Demography ==
At the 2021 census, the population of the parish was 631. In the 2011 census it had a population of 619.

== Listed buildings ==
As of 2017 there are three listed buildings in the parish, all at Grade II.
