= Hylton Castle (suburb) =

Suburb of Sunderland, England

Coordinates: 54.924°N 1.441°W

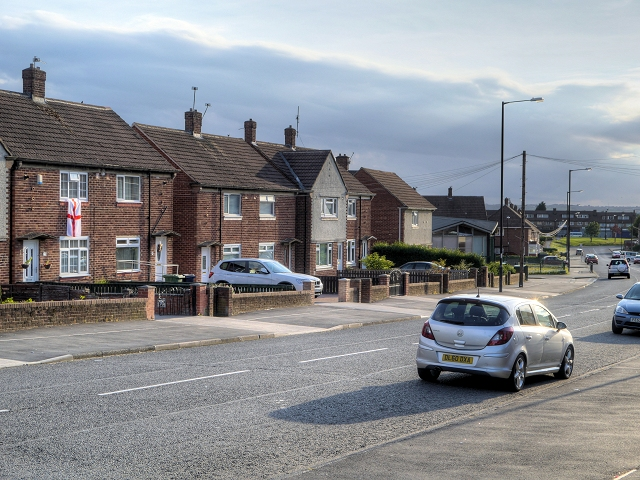
Cranleigh Road

Hylton Castle is a suburb of Sunderland, Tyne and Wear, England. It is named after the nearby Hylton Castle.
