= Allerby =

Hamlet in Cumbria, England

Coordinates: 54.73°N 3.43°W

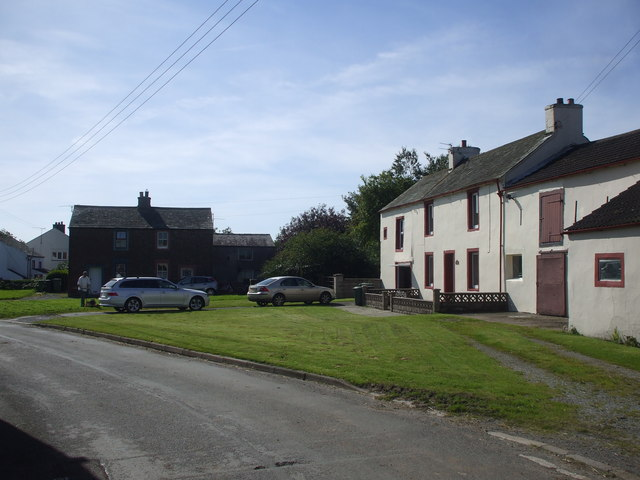
- Houses at Allerby

- Location in Allerdale, Cumbria Location within Cumbria
- OS grid reference: NY0839
- Civil parish: Oughterside and Allerby
- Unitary authority: Cumberland
- Ceremonial county: Cumbria
- Region: North West
- Country: England
- Sovereign state: United Kingdom
- Post town: WIGTON
- Postcode district: CA7
- Dialling code: 01900
- Police: Cumbria
- Fire: Cumbria
- Ambulance: North West
- UK Parliament: Penrith and Solway

Allerby is a hamlet in the civil parish of Oughterside and Allerby, Cumbria, England.

== Toponymy ==
Allerby was originally called "'Ailward's', that is 'Æðelward's, Crosby', afterwards reduced to 'Ailward's bȳ'." So, "the village or hamlet of Ailward". (Bȳ is Old English from the Old Norse býr, meaning 'village' or 'hamlet'.)
