= Henry Hylton, de jure 12th Baron Hylton =

English nobleman

Henry Hylton, de jure 12th Baron Hylton (1586 – 30 March 1641) was an English nobleman.

Hylton was the eldest son of Thomas Hylton (himself the son of William Hylton, de jure 11th Baron Hylton) and his wife, Anne née Bowes (daughter of Sir George Bowes of Streatlam Castle). In 1600, Hylton inherited the right to the barony of Hylton from his grandfather.

Peerage of England
Preceded by William Hylton	Baron Hylton (de jure); 1600–1641	Succeeded by Robert Hylton

== Sources ==
- Henry Hylton b.1585 - AncestryUK.com
- The Gentlemen's Magazine, March 1821
