= Musgrave baronets of Hartley Castle (1611) =

Baronetcy in England

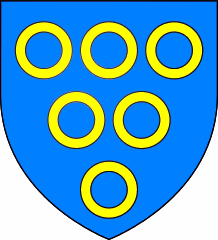
Arms of Musgrave of Musgrave, Hartley and Edenhall in Cumberland: Azure, six annulets three, two, one, or.

The Musgrave baronetcy, of Hartley Castle in the County of Westmorland, was created in the Baronetage of England on 29 June 1611 for Richard Musgrave, Member of Parliament for Westmorland.

The 2nd Baronet represented Westmorland in the House of Commons, from 1640 to 1643, and 1661 to 1678. He served as a Royalist in the Civil War. He was offered a peerage as Baron Musgrave after the Restoration, but did not take up the patent.

The 4th Baronet sat as Member of Parliament for Carlisle, Westmorland, Appleby, Oxford University and Totnes. The 5th Baronet represented Carlisle and Cumberland in Parliament; while the 6th Baronet represented Westmorland from 1741 to 1747. The 8th Baronet sat as Member of Parliament for Petersfield and Carlisle; and the 11th Baronet sat for Cumberland East and served as Lord-Lieutenant of Westmorland.

== Musgrave baronets, of Hartley Castle (1611) ==
- Sir Richard Musgrave, 1st Baronet (c. 1585–1615)
- Sir Philip Musgrave, 2nd Baronet (1607–1678)
- Sir Richard Musgrave, 3rd Baronet (died 1687)
- Sir Christopher Musgrave, 4th Baronet (c. 1631–1704)
- Sir Christopher Musgrave, 5th Baronet (1688–1736)
- Sir Philip Musgrave, 6th Baronet (c. 1712–1795)
- Sir John Chardin Musgrave, 7th Baronet (1757–1806)
- Sir Philip Musgrave, 8th Baronet (1794–1827)
- Sir Christopher John Musgrave, 9th Baronet (c. 1797–1834)
- Sir George Musgrave, 10th Baronet (1799–1872)
- Sir Richard Courtenay Musgrave, 11th Baronet (1838–1881)
- Sir Richard George Musgrave, 12th Baronet (1872–1926)
- Sir Nigel Courtenay Musgrave, 13th Baronet (1896–1957)
- Sir Charles Musgrave, 14th Baronet (1913–1970)
- Sir Christopher Patrick Charles Musgrave, 15th Baronet (born 1949)

The heir presumptive and sole heir to the title is the present holder's only brother Julian Nigel Chardin Musgrave (born 1951).

== Notes ==
Baronetage of England
| Preceded by Wentworth baronets | Musgrave baronets of Hartley Castle; 29 June 1611 | Succeeded by Seymour baronets |
