= Musgrave baronets =

Set index for Musgrave baronets

There have been four baronetcies created for persons with the surname Musgrave, one in the Baronetage of England, one in the Baronetage of Nova Scotia, one in the Baronetage of Ireland and one in the Baronetage of the United Kingdom. As of 2026 two of the creations are extant.

- Musgrave baronets of Hartley Castle (1611)
- Musgrave baronets of Hayton Castle (1638)
- Musgrave baronets of Tourin (1782)
- Musgrave baronets of Drumglass (1897): see Sir James Musgrave, 1st Baronet (1829–1904)
