= Listed buildings in Hartley, Cumbria =

Hartley is a civil parish in Westmorland and Furness, Cumbria, England. It contains 16 listed buildings that are recorded in the National Heritage List for England. All the listed buildings are designated at Grade II, the lowest of the three grades, which is applied to "buildings of national importance and special interest". The parish is to the east of the town of Kirkby Stephen. The South Durham and Lancashire Union Railway ran through it until the line closed in 1965, but two viaducts have survived and are listed. Many of the other listed buildings are houses and associated structures, farmhouses and farm buildings. The rest of the listed buildings comprise the ruins of a castle, two bridges, a boundary stone, a row of nine cairns, and a pinfold.

== Buildings ==
Name and location	Photograph	Date	Notes
Hartley Castle ruins 54.46922°N 2.33685°W	—	14th century	Most of the castle was demolished in the 18th century. Some earthworks remain, and part of the vaulted cellar to the former kitchen, later used as a store. The remains are also a Scheduled Monument.
Nine Standards; 54.45405°N 2.27158°W		Before 1635	A group of nine cairns along the boundary between the parishes of Hartley and Winton. They are in drystone, tapering towards the tops, and between about 10 feet (3.0 m) and 12 feet (3.7 m) high.
Frank's Bridge; 54.47343°N 2.34653°W		17th century	A footbridge crossing the River Eden, it is in stone and consists of two segmental arches with a central pier and a cutwater. The footpath is 4 feet 9 inches (1.45 m) wide, and the parapet has stone copings.
Lowmill Bridge; 54.47629°N 2.34831°W	—	c. 17th century	The bridge carries Hartley Road over the River Eden. It is in stone and consists of two segmental arches with a central pier and a cutwater. The bridge has flat parapets, and a horizontal band.
Lord's Stone; 54.46782°N 2.29466°W	—	1730	A boundary stone, initially marking the boundary of the lands of Sackville Tufton, 7th Earl of Thanet, and later the boundary between the parishes of Hartley and Winton. It is inscribed with carved names, initials and dates.
Barn, Hartley Castle; 54.46898°N 2.33657°W		18th century	The barn incorporates re-used 17th-cenyury material. It is in stone on a boulder plinth, and has quoins and a stone-flagged roof. The barn contains an elliptical-headed wagon entrance, three doors, a loft door, and small windows with chamfered surrounds.
Farmhouse and wall, Hartley Castle; 54.46904°N 2.33700°W		Mid 18th century	A stone house, stuccoed at the front, with quoins, a sill band, and a slate roof with stone-flagged eaves. There are two storeys and six bays. The central doorway has a cornice on consoles, and the windows are mullioned. The wall to the left incorporates a re-used niche containing a shell-head.
The Larches; 54.47410°N 2.33645°W	—	18th century	The house was built in two stages, and is in stone with a stone-flagged roof. There are two storeys and five bays, and the windows are sashes.
Braithwaite House, railings and gate 54.47446°N 2.33616°W	—	Late 18th century	A stone house with rusticated quoins and a slate roof with stone copings. It has two storeys and a symmetrical three bays front. The central door has a stone surround and the windows are sashes in architraves. The low stone area walls have segmental copings and carry wrought iron railings with pointed standards. The gate piers have pyramidal caps, and the gate has pointed arch-heads between standards.
Hartley Fold House, railings, cottage and stables 54.47582°N 2.33683°W	—	Late 18th century	The house, with a cottage and stable to the north, are in stone and have slate roofs with stone copings. The house has quoins, two storeys and a symmetrical three-bay front. The central doorway has a Tuscan doorcase, a traceried fanlight, and a semicircular canopy on brackets. The windows are sashes in architraves. The cottage has two storeys, three bays, a doorway with a chamfered surround, and sash windows, and the stable has a partly-blocked stable door and a small loft door. There are low rendered area walls with chamfered copings, wrought iron railings with pointed standards, and square gate and end piers with pyramidal caps.
Pinfold; 54.47530°N 2.33683°W	—	Late 18th century (possible)	The pinfold has drystone walls about 5 feet (1.5 m) high. It has a trapezoid plan and contains a 20th-century gate.
West View farmhouse, railings and byre 54.47558°N 2.33653°W	—	1776	The farmhouse and byre are in stone with quoins. The house has a slate roof with a coped gable to the north, two storeys, and a symmetrical front of three bays. The central doorway has a fanlight, and a hood carried on consoles, and the windows are sashes. The byre to the right, dated 1820, has a stone-flagged roof, two doors with segmental heads, and a loft door with a dated lintel. There are low area walls with flat coping and wrought iron railings that have pointed standards, and cast iron posts with urn finials.
Glenwood; 54.47477°N 2.33670°W	—	Late 18th to early 19th century	Originally a farmhouse, later a private house, it is in stone with quoins and a stone-flagged roof. There are two storeys and a symmetrical front of three bays. The central doorway has a pilastered surround and a semicircular canopy on brackets, and the windows are sashes.
Murton Holme; 54.47382°N 2.33598°W	—	Late 18th to early 19th century	Originally a house and a cottage, possibly with an older core, later one dwelling. It is in stone on a plinth, with quoins and a slate roof. There are two storeys, the original house has a symmetrical three-bay front, and the cottage to the right has one bay. Between the house and the cottage is a projecting stone chimney. Most of the windows are sashes, and there is a two-light mullioned window in the left return.
Merrygill Viaduct; 54.47009°N 2.33426°W		1861	The viaduct was built by the South Durham and Lancashire Union Railway, whose engineer was Thomas Bouch, to cross Merry Gill. It is in limestone and has nine arches, a cornice, and tall parapets. The viaduct is 110 metres (360 ft) long, and has a maximum height of 24 metres (79 ft). The railway closed in 1965.
Pod Gill Viaduct; 54.46627°N 2.33809°W		1861	The viaduct was built by the South Durham and Lancashire Union Railway, whose engineer was Thomas Bouch, to cross Ladthwaite Beck, and it was widened in 1889. It is a straight viaduct in sandstone, carried on tapering rectangular piers, and is 466 feet (142 m) high at its tallest point. On the sides of the viaduct, and within the thickness of its walls, are refuges with cast iron plates on the outside.
