= Carlisle Castle =

Castle in Cumbria, England

- Carlisle, England
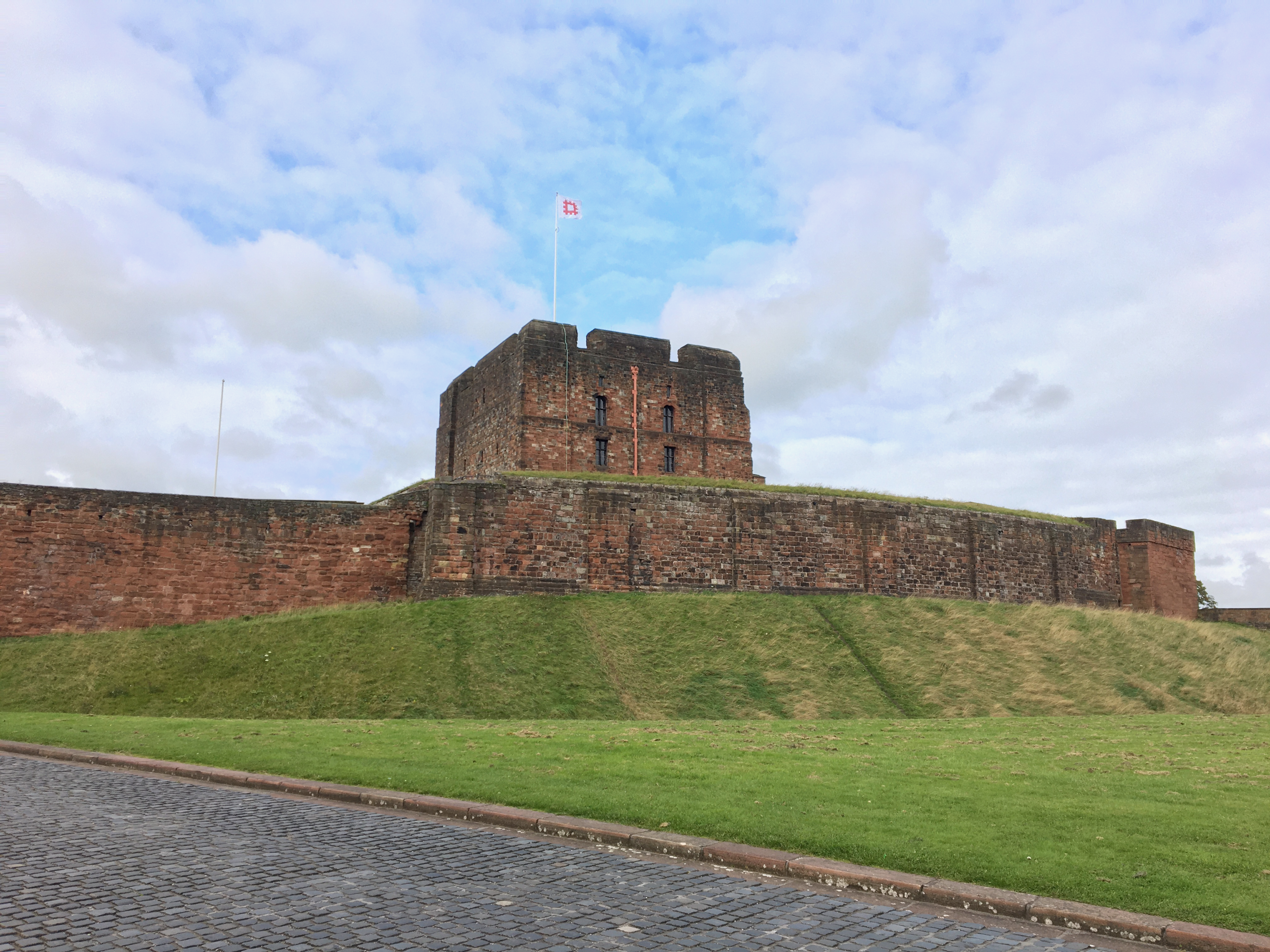
- Carlisle Castle

Site information
- Type: Castle
- Owner: English Heritage
- Open to the public: Yes
- Condition: Intact

Location
- Shown within Carlisle city centre
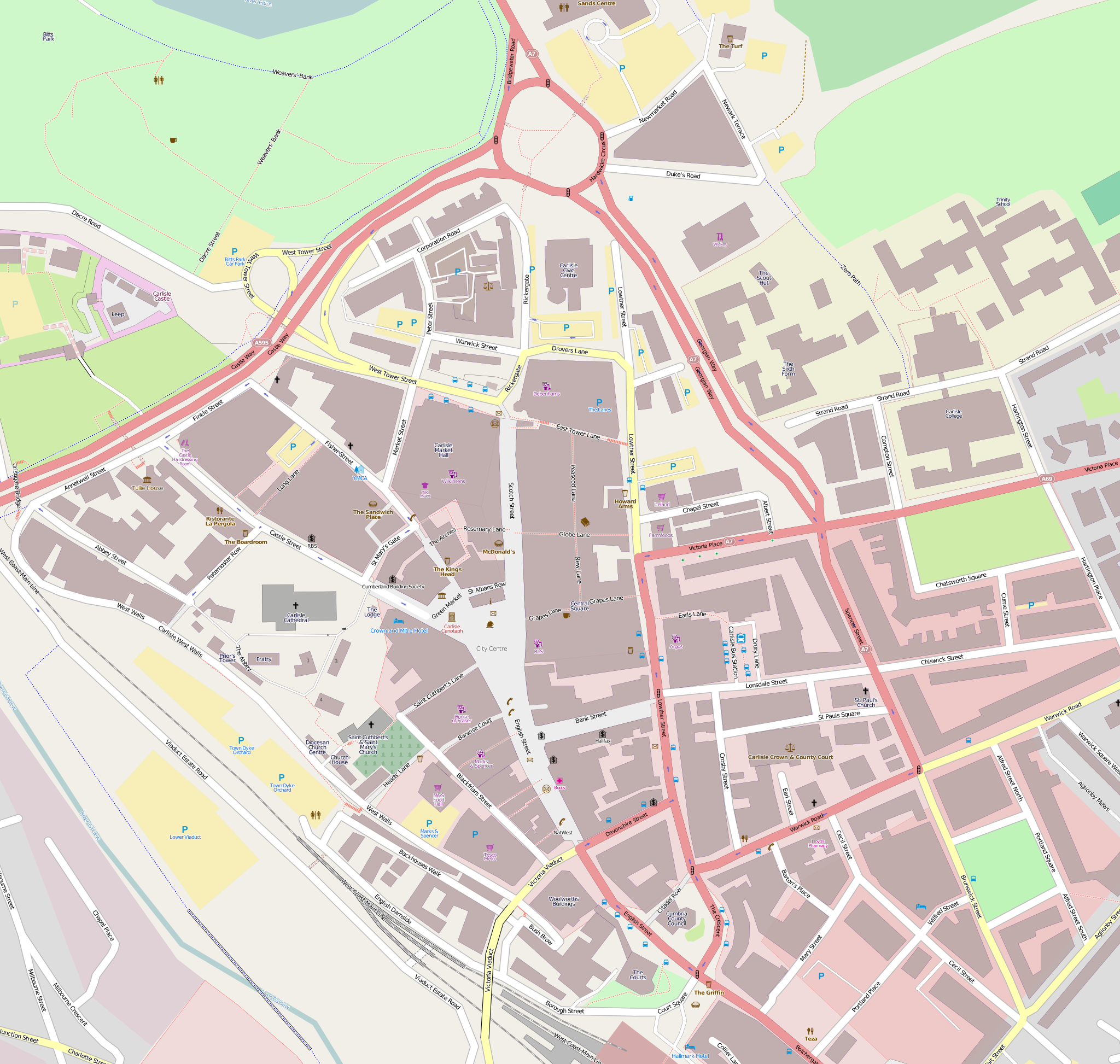
- Location within Carlisle city centre
- Coordinates: 54.897260°N 2.941936°W
- Grid reference: grid reference NY396562

Site history
- Materials: Stone
- Battles/wars: Invasion of England by King David I (1135); Siege of Carlisle (1315); Siege of Carlisle (1644); Siege of Carlisle (Nov 1745); Siege of Carlisle (Dec 1745)
- Events: The Anarchy; First War of Scottish Independence; First English Civil War; Jacobite rising of 1745

Carlisle Castle is a medieval stone fortress located in the city of Carlisle, Cumbria, near the site of Hadrian's Wall and the Roman fortress of Luguvalium. The castle was first built during the reign of William II in 1092 and rebuilt in stone under Henry I in 1122. It played an important role in the Wars of Scottish Independence in the later Middle Ages, being besieged several times. During the Jacobite Rising of 1745–1746, Carlisle became the last English fortress to undergo a siege. The castle was listed as a Scheduled Ancient Monument on 7 August 1996.

Today the property is managed by English Heritage and is open to the public. Until 2006, the castle was the administrative headquarters of the former King's Own Royal Border Regiment and until 2019 it was the county headquarters to the Duke of Lancaster's Regiment. A museum to the regiment is within the castle walls.

== History ==
Carlisle Castle was first built during the reign of William II of England (‘William Rufus’), the son of William the Conqueror. At that time, Cumberland (the original name for north and west Cumbria) was still considered a part of Scotland. William II ordered the construction of a Norman-style motte-and-bailey castle in Carlisle on the site of the old Roman fort of Luguvalium, dated by dendrochronology to 72AD, with the castle construction beginning in 1092.

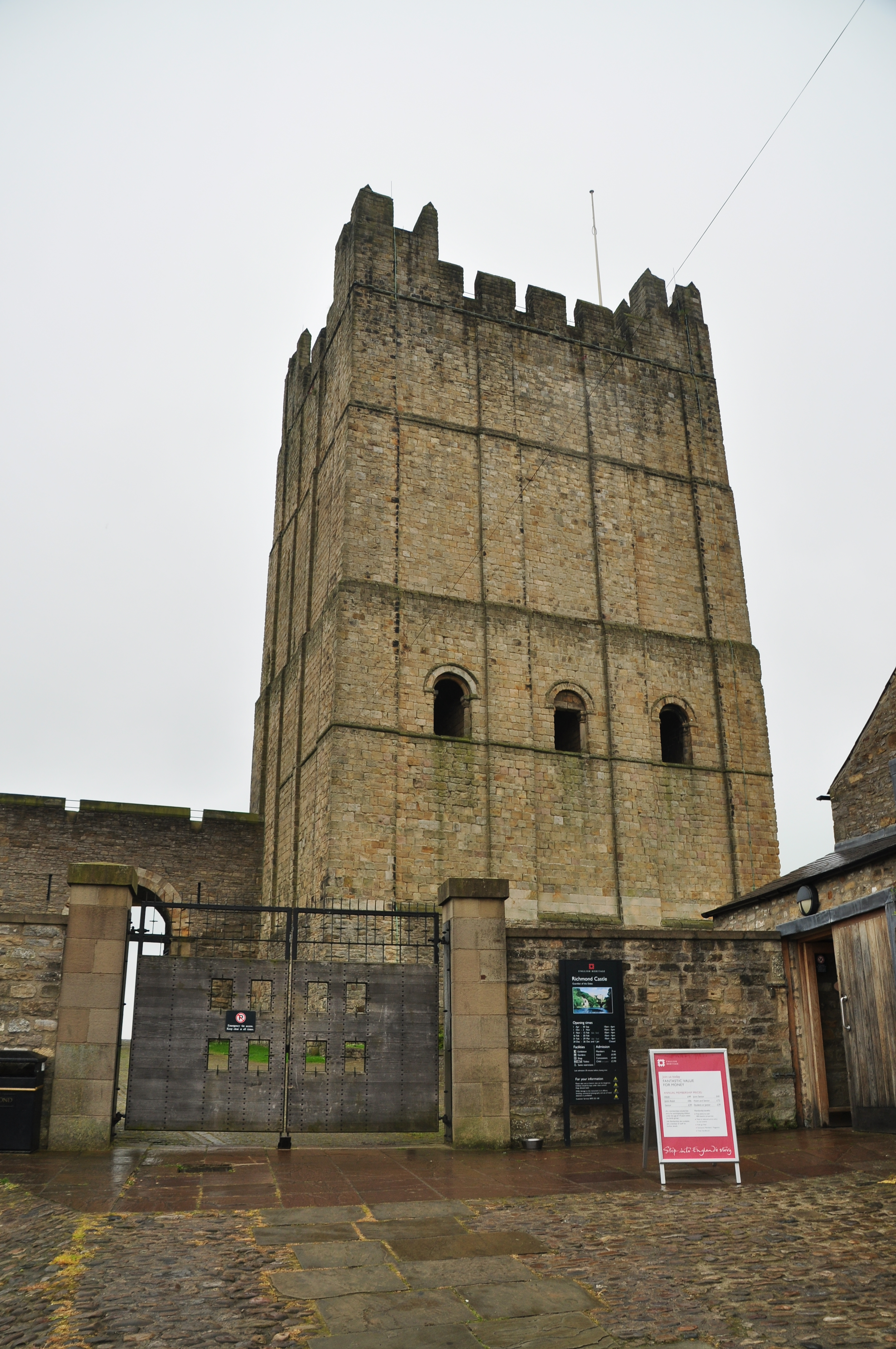
In its original form, Carlisle's keep could have been taller and may have resembled that at Richmond Castle in North Yorkshire (shown above)

In 1122, Henry I of England ordered a stone castle with towers to be constructed on the site. Thus a keep and city walls were constructed. The existing keep dates from somewhere between 1122 and 1135. The tower keep castle is one of only 104 recorded examples, most being found on the Welsh border. The castle was largely rebuilt by order of David I of Scotland following the Battle of the Standard in 1138. Henry of Anjou was knighted within the castle in 1149. David died of illness there in 1153.

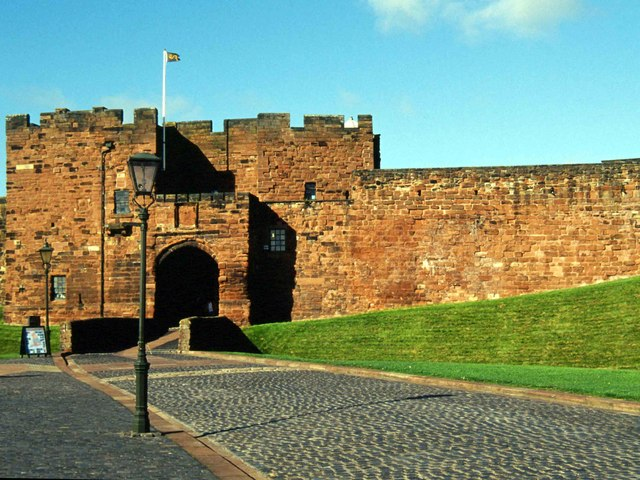
Entrance to Carlisle Castle. (De Ireby's tower)

The act of driving out the Scots from Cumberland led to many attempts to retake the lands. The result of this was that Carlisle and its castle would change hands many times for the next 700 years. The first attempt began during the troubled reign of Stephen of England.

On 26 March 1296, John 'The Red' Comyn, since the fourth quarter of 1295 Lord of Annandale, led a Scottish host across the Solway to attack Carlisle. The then governor of the castle, Robert de Brus, deposed Lord of Annandale, successfully withstood the attack, before forcing the raiders to retreat back through Annandale to Sweetheart Abbey. From 22 July to 1 August 1315, Scottish forces laid siege to the Castle. However, the Scottish lacked the resources needed to maintain a siege and withdrew.

From the mid-13th century until the Union of the Crowns of England and Scotland in 1603, Carlisle Castle was the vital headquarters of the Western March, a buffer zone to protect the western portion of the Anglo-Scottish border.

Henry VIII converted the castle for artillery, employing the engineer Stefan von Haschenperg. For a few months in 1568, Mary, Queen of Scots was imprisoned within the castle, in the Warden's Tower. Francis Knollys described her watching two football matches on a playing green outside the castle's postern gate. Later, the castle was besieged by the Parliamentary forces for eight months in 1644, during the English Civil War.

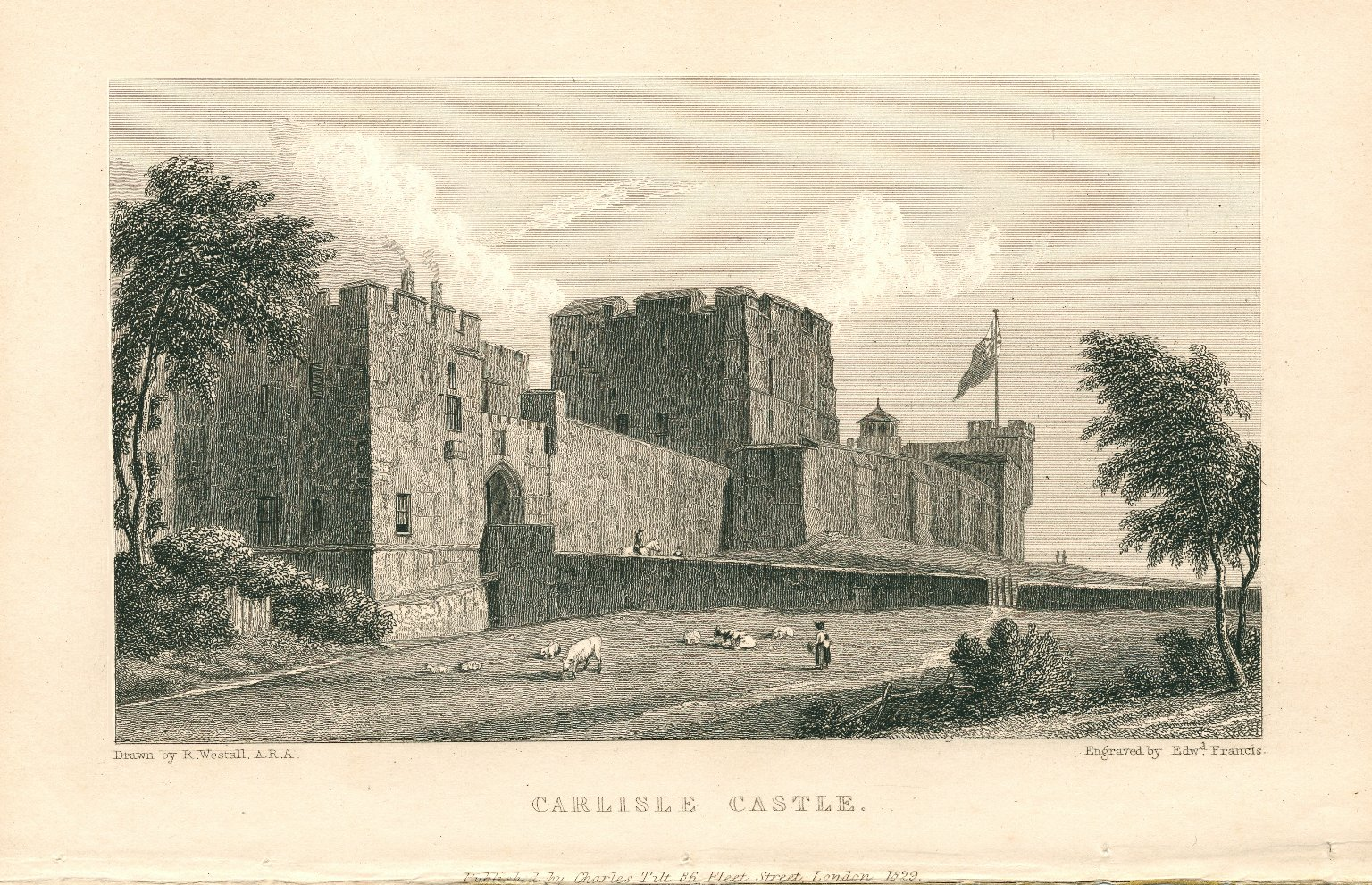
An engraving of Carlisle Castle in 1829

The last battles for the city of Carlisle and its castle were during the Jacobite rising of 1745 against George II. The forces of Prince Charles Edward Stuart travelled south from Scotland into England reaching as far south as Derby. Carlisle and the castle were seized and fortified by the Jacobites. However they were driven north by the forces of William Augustus, Duke of Cumberland, the son of George II. Carlisle was recaptured, and the Jacobites were jailed and executed. That battle marked the end of the castle's fighting life, as defending the border between England and Scotland was not necessary with both countries again one in Great Britain.

After 1746, the castle became somewhat neglected, although some minor repairs were undertaken such as that of the drawbridge in 1783.

Some parts of the castle were then demolished for use as raw materials in the 19th century to create more or less what is visible to the visitor today. In 1851 the barracks were occupied by the 33rd Regiment of Foot with 10 officers, 150 soldiers, 2 servants and 25 soldiers' wives and children. The Army moved in to take hold of the castle and in 1873 a system of recruiting areas based on counties was instituted under the Cardwell Reforms and the castle became the depot for the 34th (Cumberland) Regiment of Foot and the 55th (Westmorland) Regiment of Foot. Under the Childers Reforms, the 34th and 55th regiments amalgamated to form the Border Regiment with its depot in the castle in 1881. The castle remained the depot of the Border Regiment until 1959, when the regiment amalgamated with the King's Own Royal Regiment (Lancaster) to form the King's Own Royal Border Regiment. The Army Reserve still use parts of the castle: 8 Platoon C Company 4th Battalion the Duke of Lancaster's Regiment are based within the Burma Block alongside a Multi Cap-Badge detachment of the Army Reserve, including Medics, Engineers, Logisticicians, Intelligence and Infanteers from other Cap Badges.

Carlisle Castle was listed as (List Entry Number: 1014579) in August 1996, by what is now Historic England. The listing for the Scheduled Ancient Monument status includes "the upstanding and buried remains of Carlisle medieval tower keep castle, two lengths of Carlisle city wall, a 16th century battery, and the buried remains of much of the Roman fort known as Luguvalium, a large part of which underlies the later castle."

In 2016, Historic England undertook the first official investigation into the historic graffiti and carvings scattered over the castle site, using photogrammetric techniques to record findings. The ‘Prisoners’ Carvings’ in the Keep, and a medieval door covered in etchings, were laser scanned, photographed and filmed, alongside a Roman altar stone, medieval and postmediaeval graffiti and carvings across the complex, to produce 3D models as a record of their current condition.

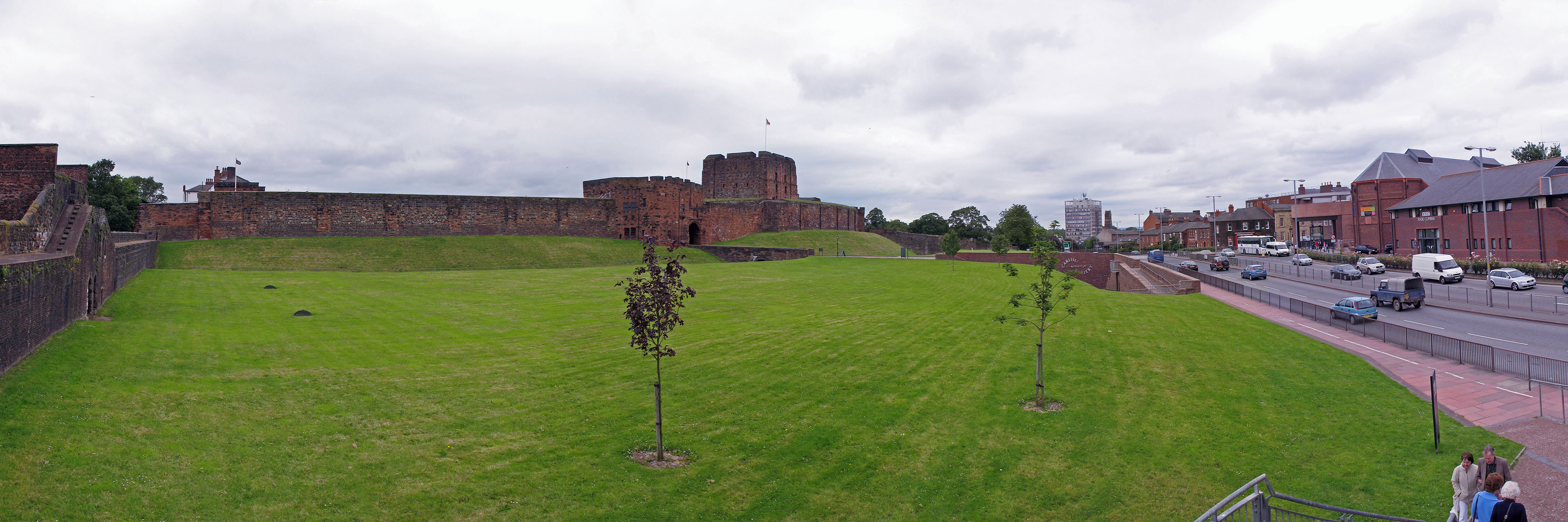
The exterior of Carlisle Castle, taken from Irishgate Bridge with the entrance in the centre and the keep behind. The wall on the left is a fragment of the city wall, with Tile Tower part way along.

== Museum ==
The Castle houses Cumbria's Museum of Military Life. The museum "relates the history of Cumbria’s County Infantry Regiment, the Border Regiment and the King’s Own Royal Border Regiment and local Militia", according to Visit Cumbria guide.

== List of governors ==
Governors appointed by:

- Henry II (1154–1189):
  - 1175– Robert de Vaux, Baron of Gilsland (died c.1195) (Sheriff of Cumberland, 1174–1183)
  - Hugh Bardulf (died 1203) (Sheriff of Cumberland, 1199)
- John (1199–1216):
  - William de Stuteville, Baron of Lyddal (Sheriff of Cumberland, 1198, 1200)
  - ?-1215 Robert de Ros, Baron of Wark (Sheriff of Cumberland, 1212–1215)
  - 1215–1216 Robert de Vaux, Baron of Gilisland
- Henry III (1216–1272):
  - 1216– Robert de Vieuxpont (Sheriff of Cumberland, 1216)
  - 1217– Walter de Gray (Archbishop of York)
  - Robert de Vaux
  - 1248– William de Dacre (died 1258) (Sheriff of Cumberland, 1236–1247)
  - Thomas de Multon (de Lucy)
  - John Baliol (later King of Scotland) (Sheriff of Cumberland, 1248)
  - -1255 & 1267- Robert de Brus, 5th Lord of Annandale (Sheriff of Cumberland, 1255, 1283)
  - William III de Forz, 4th Earl of Albemarle (Sheriff of Cumberland, 1255, 1259)
  - –1258 William de Dacre (died 1258)
  - 1260– Eustace de Baliol (Sheriff of Cumberland, 1261)
  - 1265– Roger de Leybourne (Sheriff of Cumberland, 1265)
- Edward I (1272–1307):
  - Robert de Hampton (Sheriff of Cumberland, 1274)
  - Richard de Holebrok
  - John de Swinburn (Sheriff of Cumberland, 1277)
  - 1278– Gilbert de Curwen of Workington (Sheriff of Cumberland, 1278, 1308)
  - William de Boyville (Sheriff of Cumberland, 1282)
  - 1295– Robert de Brus, 6th Lord of Annandale
  - c.1296 Michael de Harcla (Sheriff of Cumberland, 1285)
  - 1302– John de Halton, Bishop of Carlisle
  - Alexander de Bassenthwaite (Sheriff of Cumberland, 1307, 1309)
- Edward II (1307–1327):
  - Piers Gaveston, 1st Earl of Cornwall (executed 1312)
  - 1315– Ralph Fitzwilliam, Baron of Greystoke (died 1316)
  - c.1315 John de Castre (Sheriff of Cumberland, 1310, 1311, 1316)
  - c.1315–1323 Andrew de Harcla, 1st Earl of Carlisle (executed 1323) (Sheriff of Cumberland, 1311, 1312, 1318, 1319) (Warden of the Western March, 1319–)
  - 1323– Anthony Lord Lucy of Cockermouth (Sheriff of Cumberland, 1318, 1323, 1338)
  - John de Halton, Bishop of Carlisle (2nd time) (died 1324)
- Edward III (1327–1377):
  - February 1327– Anthony Lord Lucy of Cockermouth
  - c.1332 Ralph Dacre, 1st Baron Dacre (died 1339) (Sheriff of Cumberland, 1332)
  - c.1337 John de Glanton
  - John Kirkby (bishop of Carlisle)
  - Sir Hugh de Moresby (Sheriff of Cumberland, 1331)
  - Thomas, Lord Lucy (died 1365) (Sheriff of Cumberland, 1345) (Warden of the Western March, 1346–)
  - Roland de Vaux (Sheriff of Cumberland, 1338)
  - Sir Richard de Denton (Sheriff of Cumberland, 1336)
  - Sir Hugh de Lowther (Sheriff of Cumberland, 1325, 1351, 1354)
  - 1376– Roger de Clifford, 5th Baron de Clifford (Sheriff of Cumberland, 1377)
- Richard II (1377–1399):
  - Henry Percy, 1st Earl of Northumberland (Warden of the Western March, 1384–)
  - 1384–1392 Thomas de Clifford, 6th Baron de Clifford (jointly) (joint Warden of the Western March, 1386–)
  - 1385– Ralph, Lord Neville de Raby (jointly) (joint Warden of the Western March, 1386–)
  - John Lord Ross of Hamlake
  - 1395– John Holland, Earl of Huntington (Warden of the Western March, 1398–) (executed 1400)
  - Sir Lewis Clifford
- Henry IV (1399–1415);
  - Henry Lord Percy, surnamed Hotspur, Governor and General of the Marches
- Henry VI (1421–1471)
  - John Skipton (appointed February 1427, died February 1434)
- Edward IV (1442–1483);
  - Richard, Duke of Gloucester (later Richard III of England) (Warden of the Western March, 1471–1485)
- Richard III (1483–1485):
  - 1483–?1485 William Musgrave
- Henry VII (1485–1509);
  - 1485–?1502 Sir Richard Salkeld of Corby (Sheriff of Cumberland, 1483, 1495)
  - 1502–?1525 Thomas Dacre, 2nd Baron Dacre (Warden of the Western March, 1490–1525)
- Henry VIII (1509–1547);
  - 1525– Henry FitzRoy, 1st Duke of Richmond and Somerset (7 years old) (Warden of the Marches, 1525–)
    - 1525–1527 Henry Clifford, 1st Earl of Cumberland (Deputy)
  - 1527–1534 William Dacre, 3rd Baron Dacre of Gillesland (Warden of the Western March, 1527–1534)
  - 1534–1542 Henry Clifford, 1st Earl of Cumberland (Warden of the Western March, 1534–1542)
  - 1542–?1549 Thomas Wharton, 1st Baron Wharton (died 1568) (Sheriff of Cumberland, 1529, 1535, 1539) (Warden of the Western March, 1542–1549)
- Edward VI (1547–1553):
  - 1549–1550 William Dacre, 3rd Baron Dacre of Gillesland
  - 1551–?1553 John Conyers, 3rd Baron Conyers (Warden of the Western March, 1551–1553)
- Mary I (1553–1558):
  - William Dacre, 3rd Baron Dacre of Gillesland
- Elizabeth I (1558–1603):
  - William Dacre, 3rd Baron Dacre of Gillesland (died 1563)
  - c.1560–1591 Henry Scrope, 9th Baron Scrope of Bolton (Warden of the Western March, 1560–1591)
  - 1593–?1603 Thomas Scrope, 10th Baron Scrope of Bolton (last Warden of the Western March, 1593–1603)
- Charles I (1625–1649):
  - 1640– Sir Nicholas Byron (afterwards Governor of Chester, 1644)
  - c.1644 Sir Henry Stradling (Royalist)
  - 1644 Sir Thomas Glemham
  - 1645 Sir John Brown (Parliamentarian)
  - 1645 Sir William Douglas (Covenanter/Parliamentarian)
  - c.1648 Sir Philip Musgrave, 2nd Baronet (resigned July 1648) (Royalist)
  - October 1648– Sir William Livingston
  - 1649–1651 Colonel Thomas Fitch (MP for Carlisle, 1654–1655) (Parliamentarian)
  - June 1651– Sir Philip Musgrave, 2nd Baronet
  - 1658–1659 Charles Howard, 1st Earl of Carlisle
  - February 1660 – November 1660 Charles Howard, 1st Earl of Carlisle

=== Post-Restoration of the monarchy ===
- Charles II (1660–1685):
  - December 1660: Sir Philip Musgrave, 2nd Baronet (died 1678)
  - 1678–c.1685: Charles Howard, 1st Earl of Carlisle (died 1685)
  - 1684/5: Sir Christopher Musgrave, 4th Baronet
- James II (1685–1688):
  - 1687: Sir Francis Howard of Corby
  - December 1688: Sir Christopher Musgrave, 4th Baronet (MP for Carlisle, 1681–90)
- William III (1689–1702):
  - 1689: Sir John Lowther, 2nd Baronet
  - December 1689: Jeremiah Bubb (died 1692) (MP for Carlisle 1689–92)
  - March 1693 – 1738: Charles Howard, 3rd Earl of Carlisle
- George II (1727–1760):
  - 1738: Henry Howard, 4th Earl of Carlisle
  - 27 October 1739: Lt Gen. John Folliot
  - 12 August 1749: Gen. Sir Charles Howard
  - 1752: Gen. John Stanwix
- George III (1760–1820):
  - July 1763: Henry Vane, 2nd Earl of Darlington
  - 22 September 1792: Lt Gen. Montgomery Agnew
  - 8 September 1818: Lt Gen. Robert Burne
- George IV (1820–1830):
  - 18 June 1825: Maj. Gen. Sir George Adam Wood
- William IV (1830–1837):
  - 28 April 1831 – 1837: Lt Gen. James Ramsay, son of the Earl of Dalhousie (last governor)
- Victoria (1837–1901):

The post of Governor of Carlisle was abolished in 1838.

== Lieutenant-Governors of Carlisle ==
- 1724–1749: Sir Charles Howard
- 12 August 1749: Cromwell Ward
- 19 March 1812: John Farquharson

== Arthurian legend ==
In a 14th-century poem, legend has it that Sir Gawain, one of the Knights of the Round Table, stayed at the Castle of Carlisle while on a hunting expedition in the haunted Inglewood Forest. He then slept with the Carle's wife and killed him. This poem has strong parallels with another 14th-century poem about Sir Gawain and the Green Knight. The story has since been re-adapted many times, most recently in films from 1973, 1984 and 2021.

By some accounts, Carlisle Castle is none other than Camelot, the mythical seat of King Arthur's court.

== See also ==
- Grade I listed buildings in Cumbria
- Listed buildings in Carlisle, Cumbria
- Castles in Great Britain and Ireland
- List of castles in England
- Siege of Carlisle
- High Sheriff of Cumberland – Secular office of the Crown
