= Listed buildings in Winton, Cumbria =

Winton is a civil parish in Westmorland and Furness, Cumbria, England. It contains twelve listed buildings that are recorded in the National Heritage List for England. Of these, one is listed at Grade II*, the middle of the three grades, and the others are at Grade II, the lowest grade. The parish includes the village of Winton, and is otherwise rural. The listed buildings consist of houses and associated structures, farmhouses and farm buildings, and a pinfold, a boundary stone, and a former school.

== Key ==
Grade	Criteria
II*	Particularly important buildings of more than special interest
II	Buildings of national importance and special interest

== Buildings ==
Name and location	Photograph	Date	Notes	Grade
1 Manor Cottages; 54.48996°N 2.33458°W	—	17th century	Originally part of a larger house, later in a row of houses, it is in sandstone with quoins and an artificial slate roof. There are two storeys and three bays. In the centre is a doorway with a chamfered surround, above which is a decorative carved panel and a hood mould. The windows on the front have been enlarged and casements inserted. At the rear are two mullioned windows and a mullioned and transomed window.	II
Winton Hall and former granary 54.48953°N 2.33204°W	—	1665	The house was extended into the former granary in the 18th century. Both parts are in stone, the former granary is rendered and has a band, and both parts have stone-flagged roofs and two storeys. The entrance to the house is through a porch on the south front that was formerly a stair wing; it has a semicircular head and a chamfered surround. The windows on the south front are mullioned, and on the north front is a mullioned and transomed window. The former granary has a French window on the west front that has a stone surround with projecting imposts, a keystone, and a semicircular head. Above it are sash windows.	II
Skelcies Farmhouse, cottage, barn, wagon shed, walls, gate piers, and railings 54.50088°N 2.35518°W	—	1674	The oldest building is the cottage, the farmhouse being dated 1813, and both have two storeys. The cottage is stuccoed and has a stone-flagged roof with stone coping, a dated and inscribed lintel and sash windows. The farmhouse is in sandstone on a chamfered plinth, and has rusticated quoins, and a hipped slate roof. It has a symmetrical three-bay front, a doorway in an architrave with Tuscan pilasters, a semicircular fanlight, and a broken pediment. The windows are sashes in stone surrounds. The outbuildings are in stone with stone-flagged roofs. The quadrant walls in front of the house are in sandstone with segmental copings, the gate piers are square and rusticated, with ogee tops, and the railings and gates are in wrought iron.	II
Manor House; 54.49033°N 2.33473°W	—	1726	A large stone house with rusticated quoins, an eaves cornice, and a slate roof. There are three storeys and six bays, and the house has an L-shaped plan. The doorway has an architrave and a segmental pediment inscribed with initials and the date. The windows are sashes in architraves.	II*
Beckfoot; 54.49624°N 2.35710°W	—	18th century	A house that was extended in the 19th century, it is in stone on a plinth, and has rusticated quoins, an eaves cornice, and hipped slate roofs. There are two storeys, and the windows are sashes. The older part has three bays, a serpentine front, and a central French window flanked by full-height bay windows. The later part to the right is taller and has two bays, a projecting full-height porch, and a doorway with an architrave, a fanlight and a segmental pediment on consoles. The ground floor windows are in architraves and have cornices on consoles, and those in the upper floor have stone surrounds.	II
Pinfold; 54.49003°N 2.32873°W	—	18th or 19th century	The pinfold is in stone and has a circular plan. The walls are about 5 feet (1.5 m) high, and there is an ungated opening on the west side.	II
Walls and piers, Skelcies Farm; 54.49986°N 2.35744°W	—	Early 19th century	Flanking the entrance to the drive is a pair of sandstone gate piers about 4 feet (1.2 m) high. The piers are square and rusticated with ogee tops. Outside the piers are quadrant walls.	II
Boundary stone 54.48818°N 2.33431°W	—	Early to mid 19th century	The stone marks the boundary between the parishes of Winton and Hartley. It consists of a stone about 2 feet (0.61 m) high with a semicircular top, and is inscribed with the names of the parishes. On the top is a benchmark.	II
Coach-house and stables, Beckfoot; 54.49640°N 2.35740°W	—	Mid 19th century	The coach house and stables are in sandstone with quoins and a hipped slate roof. There are two storeys and five bays. On the front are a coach door and two stable doors, all with elliptical heads, and the windows are sashes. On the south side steps lead up to a first floor porch.	II
Former school 54.48992°N 2.33420°W	—	1862	The former school is in stone with rusticated quoins and a slate roof. It has a single tall storey, with a projecting gabled porch to the north. The windows have stone surrounds, projecting imposts, keystones, and round heads. At the east end is a belfry with a weathervane, and on the porch is a panel inscribed with the names of subscribers. On the east end is a lower gabled fuel store with a re-used dated and initialled lintel above the door.	II
Lodge, Beckfoot; 54.49643°N 2.35604°W	—	1895	The lodge is in stone on a chamfered plinth, and has quoins and a slate roof with stone copings and ball finials. It has a single storey and three bays. There is a central projecting porch and a doorway with an architrave and a semicircular fanlight. The windows are mullioned, and each window has a four-centred head and carved spandrels. The left bay is gabled and in the gable is a heraldic panel.	II
Walls, piers, and railings, Beckfoot; 54.49631°N 2.35597°W	—	1895	The walls flank the entrance to the drive, they are in stone, and are ramped with segmental coping. The five gate piers are cylindrical, and have caps and conical finials. The railings are in cast iron, they are 18 inches (460 mm) high, and have foliate spearhead standards. The main gate and the pedestrian gates are in wrought iron with cast iron details.	II
