= Siege of Carlisle =

The siege of Carlisle may refer to:

- Siege of Carlisle (1315), Andrew Harclay, 1st Earl of Carlisle, drove off Robert I of Scotland from a siege of Carlisle
- Siege of Carlisle (1644), Covenanters besiege but fail to take Carlisle, being held by Royalist James Graham, 1st Marquess of Montrose
- Siege of Carlisle (1645), Covenanters under Alexander Leslie, 1st Earl of Leven, besiege and take Carlisle from a Royalist garrison in 1645
- Siege of Carlisle (November 1745), the Jacobite Army under Charles Edward Stuart besiege and take Carlisle
- Siege of Carlisle (December 1745), British forces under the Duke of Cumberland besiege and retake Carlisle

== See also ==
- Battle of Carlisle (1863), Pennsylvania, United States
