= Hartley Castle =

Castle in England

- Kirkby Stephen, Cumbria
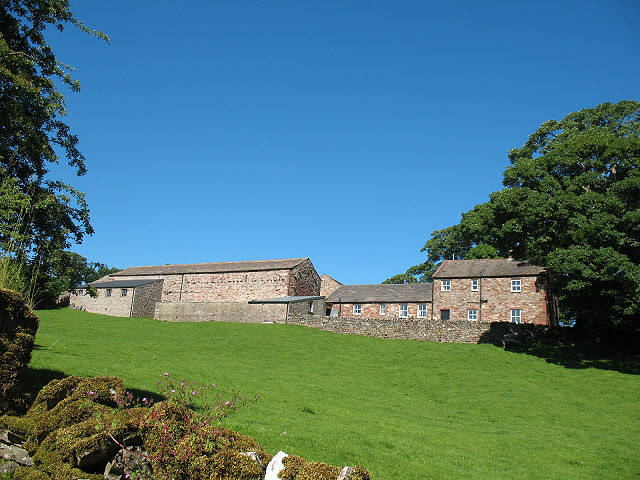
- The castle site today

Site information
- Type: Fortified manor house
- Owner: Private
- Open to the public: No
- Condition: Only earthworks and a vaulted cellar survive

Location
- Location in Eden, Cumbria Location in Cumbria, England
- Coordinates: 54.4694°N 2.3383°W
- Grid reference: grid reference NY78170828

Site history
- Materials: Stone

Hartley Castle was a castle near Kirkby Stephen, Cumbria, England.

== History ==
The manor was confiscated c. 1315 from Roger de Clifford and granted to Andrew de Harcla (anglicized to Andrew de Harclay or Hartley). The name Harcla is thought to be from the Old English for "hard ground" and may refer to the outcrop of land that the castle is built upon in the Eden valley.

The existing manor house was fortified by de Harcla, some time prior to 1323, when he was ordered by King Edward II to be hanged, drawn and quartered for alleged collusion with Robert the Bruce, and forfeited his earldom and lands. It was granted to Ralph de Neville who later sold it through three other hands to Thomas de Musgrave who on 4 October 1353 was granted a licence to crenellate by King Edward III:

mansum manerii ... Harcla quod prope Marchiam Scociae situatur et per Scotos inimicos nostros saepius ante haec tempora combustum extitit et destructum

which roughly speaking says fortification was needed because

Harcla is situated near the Scottish Marches and because our enemy the Scots have often burned and destroyed it.

It was improved during the 17th century with the addition in 1615 of a pair of wings but was abandoned circa 1677. Thomas Machel visited the castle in 1677 and described it as

An Elizabethan building consisting of an inner quadrangle surrounded by buildings, and an outer court to the north protected by a thick and high curtain wall. The entrance to it was approached through a gateway at the head of a flight of steps from the road. Directly opposite an archway opened into the inner court; on the left, or east side, was the kitchen and buttery, with the hall beyond, entered by an external stair from the court; the south end was occupied by the chapel and withdrawing rooms; whilst on the western side there was a long gallery lighted by a large oriel window facing the quadrangle

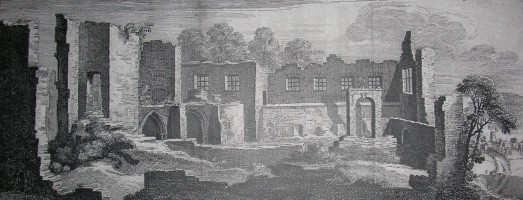
Hartley Castle engraved by Samuel and Nathaniel Buck, 1739

Another sketch from 1692 shows a thick, high curtain wall enclosing a square outer court, with an inner court enclosed by three and four storey buildings. The image at right shows what remained by the beginning of the 18th century. It was demolished between 1704 and 1744 for building stone which was used to repair Edenhall.

The castle layout appears to have been similar to Sudeley Castle in the Cotswolds, with its double courtyards separated by a low dividing wall and a central small door and its oriel-windowed hall, but without Sudeley's later Southern Wing and with a curtain wall demarking the second courtyard instead.

A simple 3D impression of the castle from the 1677 description and the 1739 engraving

== Today ==
The 3D model viewed from the same direction as the engraving

Apart from limited earthworks, all that remains now is a few metres of wall and stairs down to a vaulted cellar for the former kitchen. The site currently houses a late-18th-century farmhouse and outbuildings.

== See also ==
- Listed buildings in Hartley, Cumbria
- Castles in Great Britain and Ireland
- List of castles in England
- Sudeley Castle
