= John Langhorne (poet) =

English clergyman, poet, translator, editor and author (1735–1779)

John Langhorne was an English clergyman, poet, translator, editor and author.

== Life ==
He was born in March 1735 in Winton, a village in the former Westmorland, now the Eden District of Cumbria:

In Eden's vale where early fancy wrought
Her wild embroidery on the ground of thought.

John Langhorne's father was also a clergyman and died when his son was four. His mother made sure he had a school education, first in Winton village and then in Appleby, but there were not sufficient funds to send him to university. From the age of 18, he supported himself by teaching at various places in Yorkshire and finally was appointed tutor to the nine sons of Robert Cracroft at Hackthorn Hall in Lincolnshire. Having taken deacon's orders, he left in 1761 and, after a curate's appointment in Dagenham, became curate and lecturer at St. John's, Clerkenwell in 1764, and was appointed assistant preacher at Lincoln's Inn at the end of the following year.

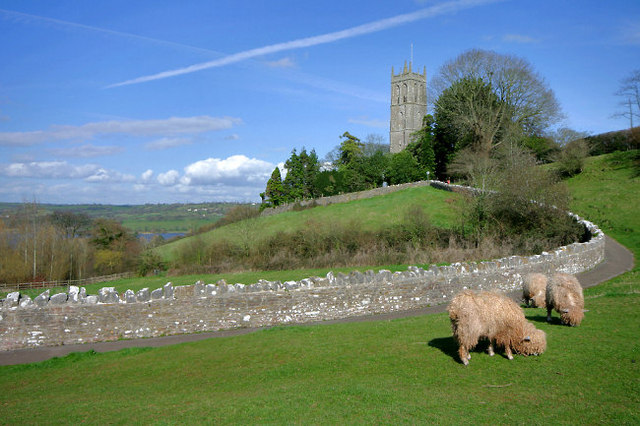
Langhorne's hilltop church in Blagdon

Langhorne now began to put his literary talents to use, particularly as a reviewer for the Monthly Review, where his sarcastic style earned him many enemies. He was more generous in the case of William Collins, whose poetry at that period was largely disregarded. Langhorne brought out a first edition of his collected poems in 1765, subsequent re-editions of which eventually helped establish Collins' reputation. Then in 1766 Langhorne brought out his own Poetical Works and that same year became rector of Blagdon. Now at last he was in a position to marry Ann Cracroft, with whom he had been corresponding since his employment at Hackthorn Hall, but she died giving birth to a son - John Theodosius Langhorne - on 4 May 1768.

Following his wife's death, Langhorne left Blagdon to stay for a while with his elder brother William at Folkestone. There they made their joint translation of Plutarch's Lives (published in 1770) with such success that it was frequently reprinted. In 1772 Langhorne was married for the second time to Isabella Thomson, the daughter of a Westmorland magistrate, but she too was to die on the birth of her first child (a daughter, Isabella Maria Constantia) in 1776. But in other ways his fortunes were rising. He was made a justice of the peace and at the suggestion of a fellow magistrate began work on his most substantial poem, The Country Justice, published in three parts 1774–7. Then in 1777 he was installed as a prebendary of Wells Cathedral but died on 1 April 1779 at the age of 45 two years later in Blagdon, Somerset.

== Writing ==
John Langhorne wrote with great diligence and produced a large number of works in both prose and verse which were much read at the time but very quickly went out of fashion again. His poetry was summed up by a later writer as characterised by "a delicious sweetness, an harmonious flow of diction, tender and lovely sentiment, and a pathos, mild, delicate, graceful and elegant.". But even friendly writers had to admit that "his chief faults are redundant decoration and an affectation of false and unnecessary ornament". On account of this, his literary and political enemies made of him a new candidate for inclusion in Alexander Pope's satire The Dunciad. In Charles Churchill's "The Candidate", Langhorne is characterised as "simple in his lay" and a sleeping partner "with Dullness on her throne". Hugh Kelly's "Thespis" condemns his "recreant name/ to drive with Flecknoe down the sink of fame". His heavy drinking was also frequently mentioned.

Two of Langhorne's works in particular were singled out later for praise. The "Fables of Flora" (1771) have the novel approach of using interactions between plants to deliver moral lessons, although there are rare precedents in Aesop's Fables, of which the best-known example is "The Oak and the Reed". Langhorne's floral debates, however, are related at greater length with overwrought and often ludicrous imagery:

Where prostrate vales, and blushing meads,
And bending mountains own his sway,
While Persia's lord his empire leads
And bids the trembling world obey,
While blood bedews the straining bow,
And conquest rends the scatter'd air.

Turning to The Country Justice, Robert Chambers accounts it to be "the only poem of Langhorne's which has a cast of originality…He seems to have anticipated George Crabbe in painting the rural life of England in true colours." William Wordsworth also praised the poem enthusiastically for the way it "brought the Muse into the company of common life".

Wordsworth might well be impressed, since that agenda was his own. Another critic, however, sees Langhorne as anticipating something of Wordsworth's nature mysticism too, as it is foreshadowed in his "Lines written a few miles above Tintern Abbey". In the same spirit, Langhorne's "Inscription on the door of a study" exhorts the reader to go out of doors instead and seek what can be learned "in yonder grove":

If Religion claims thy care,
Religion, fled from books, is there.
For first from Nature's works we drew
Our knowledge and our virtue too.

It is in performances like these that we find the value of the transitional poets of the second half of the 18th century as they abandon Augustan models for their own resources.
