= Kaber, Cumbria =

Village and civil parish in Cumbria, England

Coordinates: 54.4989°N 2.31444°W

Kaber
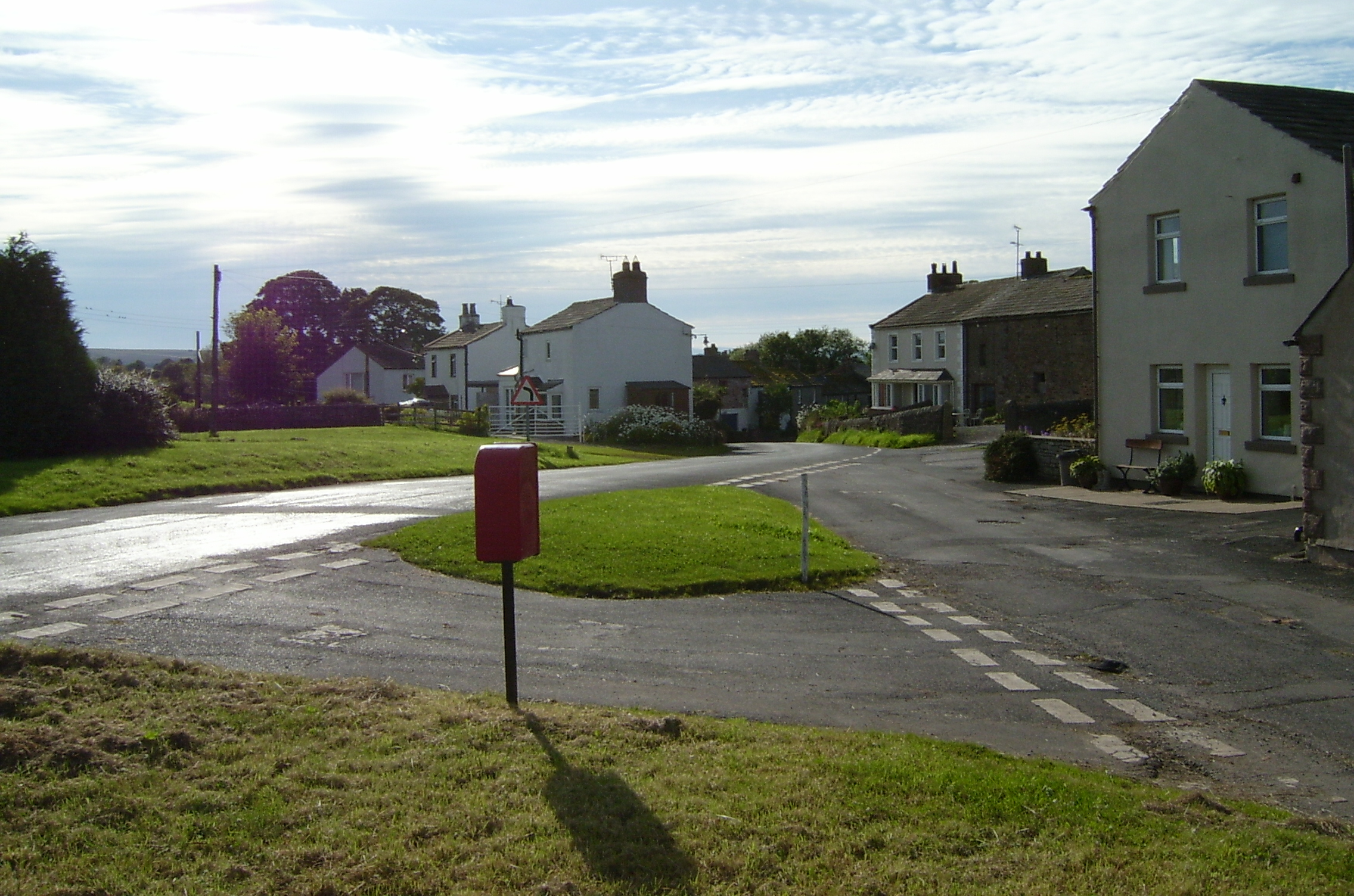
- Kaber

- Location within Cumbria
- Population: 89 (2001)
- OS grid reference: NY7911
- Civil parish: Kaber
- Unitary authority: Westmorland and Furness
- Ceremonial county: Cumbria
- Region: North West
- Country: England
- Sovereign state: United Kingdom
- Post town: KIRKBY STEPHEN
- Postcode district: CA17
- Dialling code: 01768
- Police: Cumbria
- Fire: Cumbria
- Ambulance: North West
- UK Parliament: Westmorland and Lonsdale

Kaber is a village and civil parish in the Westmorland and Furness unitary authority of the ceremonial county of Cumbria, England.

== Etymology ==
The name of Kaber is first attested in the twelfth century as Caberg, Kabergh and similar spellings. The first element comes from Old English cā or Old Norse ká, both meaning "jackdaw" and the second from Old English beorg or Old Norse berg, meaning "hill". Thus the name once meant "jackdaw hill".

== Location and topography ==
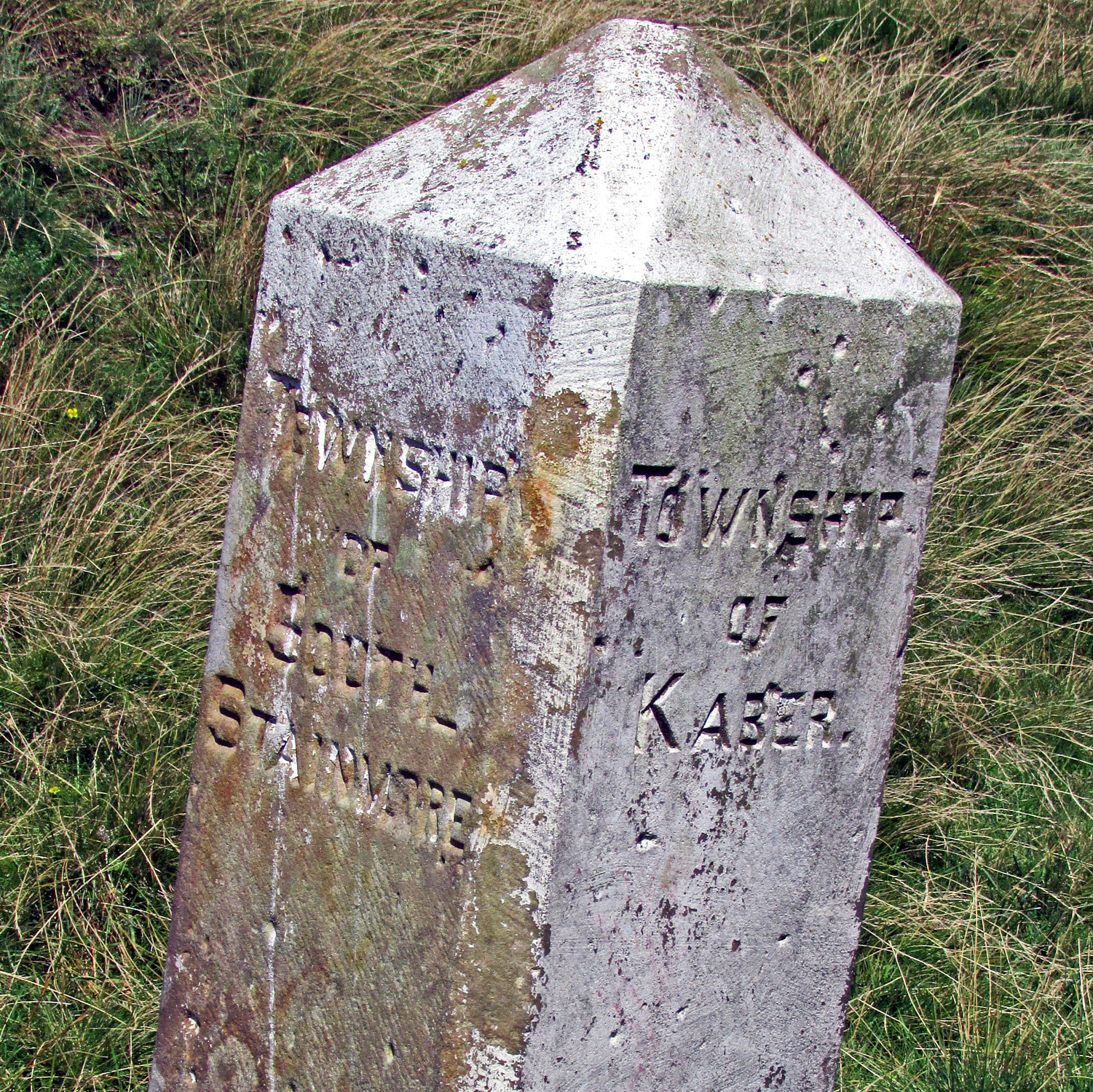
Kaber township marker stone on the road to Tan Hill

The village is located about 2 miles (3.2 km) to the south of Brough. Until the latest boundary changes Kaber was situated in the historic county of Westmorland.

The place-name 'Kaber' is first attested in the Register of the Priory of Wetherhal, circa 1195, where it appears as Kaberge. The name means 'jackdaw hill'.

The northern boundary of the civil parish is formed by the River Belah which rises near Kaber Fell to the southeast and flows just north of the village en route to joining the River Eden.

The population taken at the 2011 Census was less than 100. Parish record details are maintained in the adjacent parish of Winton.

== See also ==
- Listed buildings in Kaber, Cumbria
