= Listed buildings in Kaber, Cumbria =

Kaber is a civil parish in Westmorland and Furness, Cumbria, England. It contains ten listed buildings that are recorded in the National Heritage List for England. All the listed buildings are designated at Grade II, the lowest of the three grades, which is applied to "buildings of national importance and special interest". The parish contains the village of Kaber and the surrounding countryside. All but one of the listed buildings are in the village, and are associated with two buildings, Nelson House and The Buildings Farmhouse. The other listed building is a farmhouse and barn in the countryside.

== Buildings ==
Name and location	Photograph	Date	Notes
Heggerscales Farmhouse and barn 54.48941°N 2.27659°W	—	1712	The farmhouse and barn are in stone, on a plinth, and have a stone-flagged roof. A parallel range was added later to the rear of the house. The house has two storeys, a symmetrical front of five bays, a central gabled porch, and sash windows. At the rear of the barn, to the left of the house, are an elliptical-headed entrance, and a door with a loft door above.
Nelson House and stables 54.49917°N 2.31411°W		1774	Originally an inn, it later become a private house. The house and stables are in stone with quoins and stone-flagged roofs. The house has two storeys, a symmetrical three-bay front, a central doorway, and sash windows, all in stone surrounds. The stables to the left are higher, and contain two doors, two windows and a loft door.
Barns, byres, and gin-gang, The Buildings Farm; 54.49991°N 2.31109°W	—	Late 18th to early 19th century	A range of farm buildings in stone with quoins to the east of the farmhouse. The byre and gin-gang have stone-flagged roofs, the threshing barn has a roof of corrugated asbestos, and the ramp barn has a green slate roof with a stone-flagged outshut. The gin-gang has a semicircular plan. There are various openings, almost all with segmental heads.
The Buildings Farmhouse; 54.49974°N 2.31261°W	—	Mid 19th century	The farmhouse is in stone with quoins, and has a green slate roof with stone coping at the west end. There are two storeys and a symmetrical front of three bays. The central doorway and the windows, which are sashes, have stone surrounds.
Barn and byre ranges, The Buildings Farm; 54.49985°N 2.31217°W	—	Mid 19th century	The barns and byres form two ranges at right angles to the east of the farmhouse. They are in stone with quoins and green slate roofs. The ranges contain wagon doorways, smaller doors and windows, all with segmental heads; those on the north range also have projecting imposts and keystones. In the east range external steps lead up to a loft door.
Barn (west), The Buildings Farm; 54.49961°N 2.31326°W	—	Mid 19th century	The barn to the west of the farmhouse is in stone with quoins and has a corrugated asbestos roof. In the centre of the front is a wagon door.
Dairy, The Buildings Farm; 54.49983°N 2.31285°W	—	Mid 19th century	The dairy to the northwest of the farmhouse is in stone with quoins, and has a hipped slate roof. It has a single storey with a cellar, and on the front are a door and a sash window.
Forecourt walls, The Buildings Farmhouse; 54.49941°N 2.31260°W	—	Mid 19th century	The walls enclose the garden at the front of the farmhouse, and separate it from the courtyard. The walls are in stone, and about 10 feet (3.0 m) high. They contain two square gate piers with domed tops.
Pig-sties, The Buildings Farm; 54.49966°N 2.31299°W	—	Mid 19th century	The pig-sties are to the west of the farmhouse. They are in stone with quoins and have a green slate roof with stone-flagged eaves. The pig-sties are in a single storey and have three plank doors.
Byre and barn, Nelson House; 54.49926°N 2.31393°W	—	Undated	The barn and byre are at right angles to the house. They are in stone with quoins, the barn has a roof of green slate, and the byre a roof of corrugated asbestos. On the west side of the barn are an elliptical-headed wagon doorway, a door, a loft door, and two windows.
