= Anthony de Lucy =

English nobleman

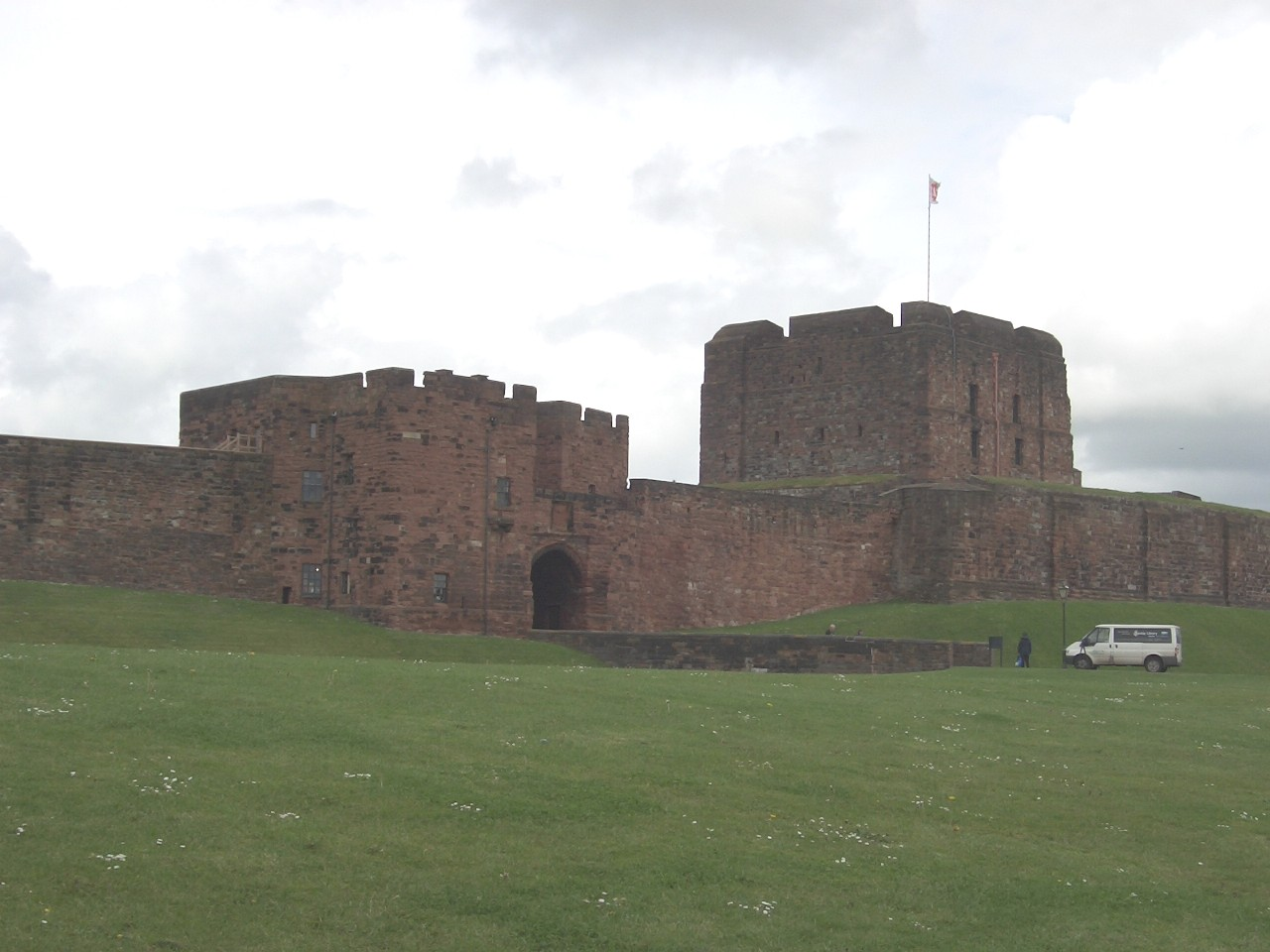
Carlisle Castle, Cumberland

Anthony de Lucy (1283–10 June 1343), 1st Baron Lucy or Luci, was an English nobleman who served as warden of Carlisle Castle and Chief Justiciar of Ireland.

== Life ==
Lord Lucy's coat of arms. The fish are pikes, and thus form a pun on the name: "lucy" is an old word for "pike"

Lucy was the second son of Sir Thomas de Lucy (formerly de Multon) of Papcastle in Cumberland, and his wife Isabel de Bolteby. He succeeded to the family estates at the age of twenty-five on the death of his brother in 1308. In 1314 he fought at the Battle of Bannockburn; after the English defeat he managed to escape the battlefield, but was later captured and ransomed. In 1318, he was appointed High Sheriff of Cumberland and assigned to defend the city and castle of Carlisle against the incursions and attacks of the Scots. In 1321 he was summoned to Parliament under the title Baron Lucy. In 1323 he obtained a grant of the castle and honour of Cockermouth.

On 25 February 1323, Luci succeeded in arresting Andrew Harclay, Earl of Carlisle at Carlisle Castle for treacherously negotiating a peace treaty with the Scots, for which Harclay was hanged, drawn and quartered. In 1323 Lucy was appointed Governor of the Castle of Carlisle. Later, he was appointed warden of the counties of Westmoreland and Cumberland during the king's absence in Aquitaine.

Lord Lucy was also nominated Chief Justiciar (equivalent to a modern Prime Minister) of Ireland in 1331 for two years. He then served a second term as High Sheriff of Cumberland from 1337 to 1342.

He died on 10 June 1343. He had married Elizabeth de Tiliol and was succeeded as Lord Lucy by his only son Thomas.
