= George Adam Wood =

Major-General Sir George Adam Wood KCH CB
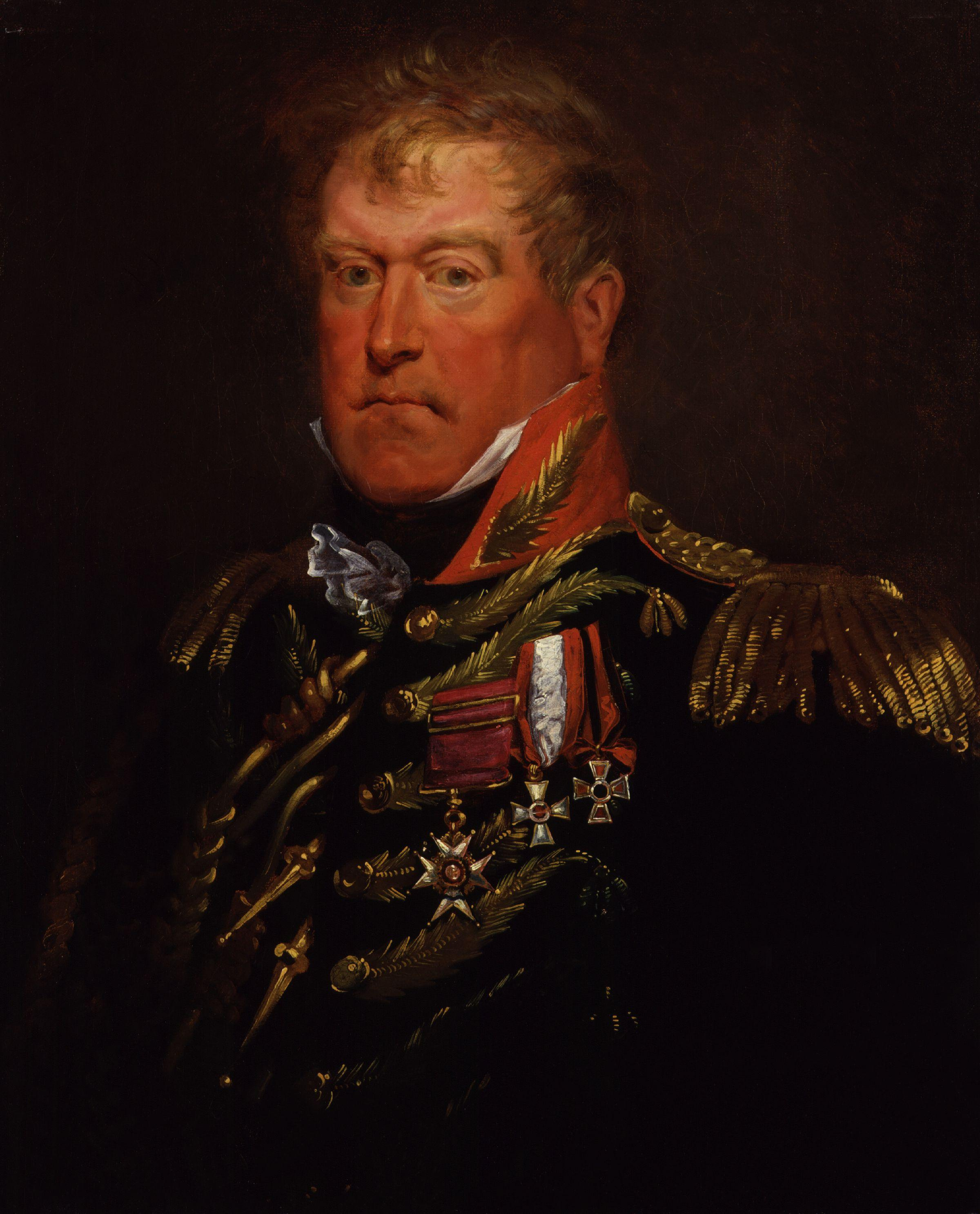
- Born: 1767
- Died: 22 April, 1831 (aged 63–64) London, England
- Allegiance: United Kingdom
- Branch: British Army
- Rank: Major-General
- Conflicts: Peninsular War; Battle of Waterloo

Sir George Adam Wood (1767 – 22 April 1831) was a British Army officer who served in the Peninsular War and fought at the Battle of Waterloo on 18 June 1815.

== Biography ==
He was born the son of Lieutenant Adam Wood (d. 1773), who served with Captain Coote's Independent Company of Foot based at Landguard Fort, and Francis (d. 2 January 1822).

After passing through the Royal Military Academy at Woolwich, London, he received a commission as second lieutenant in the Royal Artillery on 24 May 1781. His further commissions were dated: lieutenant, 15 May 1790; captain-lieutenant, 7 January 1795; captain, 3 December 1800; major, 24 July 1806; lieutenant-colonel, 1 February 1808; brevet colonel, 4 June 1814; regimental colonel, 11 May 1820; major-general, 27 May 1825. He served with the army under the Duke of York in Flanders in the campaigns of 1793 to 1795, taking part in the principal operations. Shortly after his return to England he went to the West Indies, and was present under Sir Ralph Abercromby at the capture of Saint Lucia in May 1796, and of Saint Vincent in June of that year. In February 1797 he sailed with Abercromby's expedition from Martinique to the Gulf of Paria, was at the capture of Trinidad on 17 February, and at the subsequent unsuccessful attempt on Puerto Rico.

Wood served with distinction in the Mediterranean from 1806 until 1808; he then went to Portugal, took part in Sir John Moore's campaign, was at the Battle of Coruña on 16 January 1809, and returned with the British army to England. In July he was in the expedition under the Earl of Chatham to Walcheren, and was at the siege of Flushing and its capture on 14 August. He was knighted on 22 May 1812. He commanded the Royal Artillery of the army under Sir Thomas Graham (afterwards Lord Lynedoch), which co-operated with the allies in Holland and Flanders. Landing at Rotterdam in December 1813, he was at the Siege of Antwerp in January 1814, and at the action of Merxem on 13 January 1814. He was at the unsuccessful assault on Bergen op Zoom on 8 March, and the subsequent blockade of that place and of Antwerp. For his services he received brevet promotion, and was made an aide-de-camp to King George IV.

In 1815 Wood commanded the whole of the royal artillery in the Waterloo Campaign, in the battles of Quatre Bras (16 June) and of Waterloo (18 June), in the march to Paris and the operations against the fortresses of Maubeuge, Landrecy, Mariembourg, Philippeville, and Cambray, and at the entry into Paris on 7 July. For his services in this campaign Wood was mentioned in despatches, was made a Companion of the Order of the Bath (CB) on the 22 May 1812 and knighted when proxy to Sir J. C. Sherbrooke. He also received the Waterloo Medal, and was permitted to accept and wear the insignia of the fourth class of the Order of St. Vladimir (K.St.V) of Russia, the third class of the Order of Wilhelm of the Netherlands, and the knighthood of the Military Order of Maria Theresa (KMT) of Austria. The following year he was made a knight commander of the royal Royal Hanoverian Guelphic Order (KCH). He commanded the British artillery of the army of occupation in France until 1819, when he returned to England.

He was appointed Governor of Carlisle on 24 June 1825 and died in London on 22 April 1831.
