= Hartley, Cumbria =

Village and civil parish in Cumbria, England

Coordinates: 54.474035°N 2.336186°W

Hartley
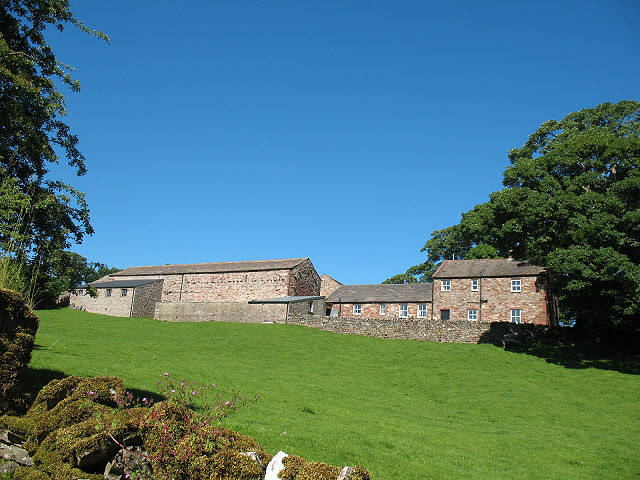
- Hartley Castle

- Location within Cumbria
- Population: 138 (2011)
- OS grid reference: NY7808
- Civil parish: Hartley
- Unitary authority: Westmorland and Furness
- Ceremonial county: Cumbria
- Region: North West
- Country: England
- Sovereign state: United Kingdom
- Post town: KIRKBY STEPHEN
- Postcode district: CA17
- Dialling code: 01298
- Police: Cumbria
- Fire: Cumbria
- Ambulance: North West
- UK Parliament: Westmorland and Lonsdale

Hartley is a village and civil parish in the Westmorland and Furness district of Cumbria, England. It is about 0.5 miles (0.8 km) east of Kirkby Stephen. The area has many old lead and copper mines that are now abandoned as well as a large quantity of iron haematite, ironstone and ore. At the highest peak in Hartley stand nine obelisks referred to as "Nine Standards". Nobody knows the true purpose of the "Nine Standards" although some believe that they were used to create a sense of a forthcoming army to scare the enemy forces. However, it is more widely believed that they were placed as geographical aid to help outline the borders between the two neighbouring counties, Westmorland and Yorkshire. Hartley is also home to Hartley Castle. It was originally built as a "tower house circa 1353 and extended circa 1600" and then re- developed in the 18th century. The castle was built at the southern point of Hartley.

In the 1870s, Hartley was described as:

Hartley, a township in Kirkby-Stephen parish, Westmoreland; 1 mile SE of Kirkby-Stephen. Acres, 3, 350. Real property, with Winton, £4, 159. Pop., 215. Houses, 45. Hartley Castle stood on an eminence; belonged to successively the Veteriponts, the Hartleys, the Nevilles, and the Musgraves; and was demolished in the early part of the 18th century. The township is mountainous; includes Hartley fell; and contains coal, lead, and copper

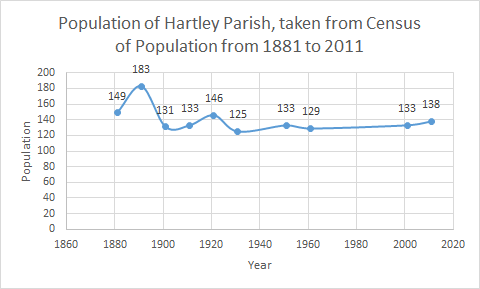
Population graph for the parish of Hartley, taken from census population data from 1881 to 2011

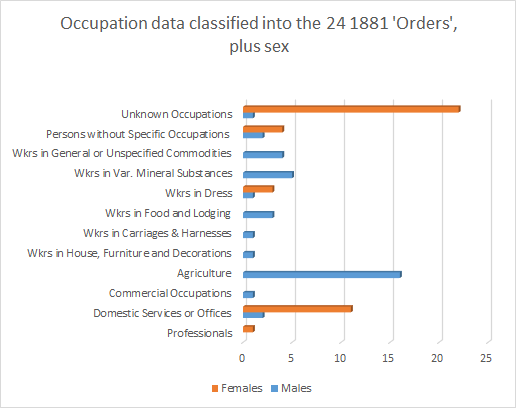
1881 Occupation Data of Hartley

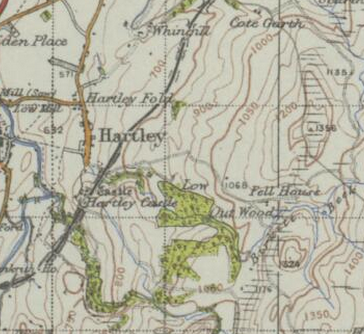
Ordnance Survey of Great Britain New Popular Edition, Sheet 84 – Teesdale created in 1945

== Brief history of Hartley ==
The history of Hartley changes in correlation with the power struggle between different parties for control over England. Sir Andrew de Harcala was given residence at Hartley Castle in the 13th century as he served Edward II and then was later pronounced Earl of Carlisle. However, when Robert the Bruce invaded the north of England, Sir Andrew de Harcala was executed on account of treason. After, the new owner of the Hartley Castle fortified the house later that century. However, Sir Andrew de Harcala was also given other pieces of estate including the Kings Watermill now known as Hartley Low Mill. As well as losing residence at Hartley Castle, Sir Andrew also lost the Kings Watermill as soon as he was executed. The Kings Watermill was then later sold to the Musgraves family. The Mill was repaired in 1754 by Sir Philip Musgrave and given a "new cog wheel and 'trunls', for £1.14". In 1914, the Musgraves family sold Hartley Low mill to a James Cleasby and from then, the owners and tenants of Low Mill have changed throughout the 20th century.

== Population of Hartley over time ==
The population of Hartley has remained rather consistent over time. Hartley is a very small parish and because of this, differences in population over time are difficult to notice. However, in 1891 it had a population of "183" people. This shows the greatest population change in the time span of 10 years (54 residents). Throughout the 20th century, the census data from the years recording the population of Hartley remained at a constant level which continued into the start of the 21st century. In 2011, Hartley had a population of "138". By analysing the population in the whole of the Eden district from the neighbourhood statistics website it shows that in Eden in 2011, there was a total population of "52,564". This shows that Hartley made up only 0.26% of the population of the Eden district in 2011.

== Occupation census in 1881 ==
The census in 1881 helps show the different occupations that the population of Hartley, Westmorland had at the time. One of the most noticeable factors about the occupations in Hartley is the divide in work by gender. The majority of females in Hartley had unknown occupations or worked in domestic services. A domestic service can include being a maid or a cleaner. There was only one female that had a professional occupation however, this female also happened to be the only person in Hartley with a professional occupation. On the other hand, the males in Hartley had more specific occupations. The most popular occupation in Hartley in 1881 was one linked to agriculture, most likely farmers. This shows that agriculture was a big part of the culture of Hartley and its people. From looking at the types of occupations, males had an occupation that usually involved some type of labour whereas females either did not have an occupation or did not have occupation that involved hard labour. It is also evident to show that only three males either had an unknown occupation or didn't have a specific occupation. This was most likely due to males being seen in society as those to provide an income for their families whilst the females stayed at home and were expected to look after the children and their homes for their husbands. Although, at this time in history, there was gender inequality and men were usually employed. Whilst for women, it was very difficult for them to acquire a job as they were expected by society to not work and to be dependent on men. The Victoria and Albert Museum states that "Traditionally, women were defined physically and intellectually as the 'weaker' sex, in all ways subordinate to male authority. In private life women were subject to fathers, husbands, brothers even adult sons". This is ultimately down to the social views on what men and women should do in terms of occupations and the limits that women had in 1881.

== Occupation census in 2011 ==
Hartley had a population of "138" according to the 2011 census. The 2011 census data shows the different occupations that men and women had in Hartley 2011. One key feature shown in the 2011 occupation data of Hartley is the high number of men and women who have professional occupations. The highest number of occupations that women had were Professional occupations (10). Whereas, the most popular occupation for men in Hartley are Skilled trade occupations (13) closely followed by Managers, directors and senior officials (11). The most unpopular professions for both genders were Sales and Customer Service Occupations, Process, plant and machine operatives and Elementary occupations. One main difference between the occupation data from the 1881 census and the 2011 census is the increase in employed women. In 1881, only one woman was able to obtain a professional occupation in Hartley. Whereas, 130 years later, this number has increased to ten. The popularity in the different types of occupations has also changed from 1881. In 1881, popular occupations were professions that involved manual labour such as Agriculture. Nevertheless, in 2011 there is a greater popularity in more occupations that aren't as labour-intensive. For example, there is a larger section of the population of Hartley working in the service sector working as Managers, directors and senior officials.

== See also ==
- Listed buildings in Hartley, Cumbria
