= Siege of Carlisle (1315) =

1315 Siege of Carlisle in the First War of Scottish Independence

Coordinates: 54.895°N 2.934°W

- Part of the First War of Scottish Independence
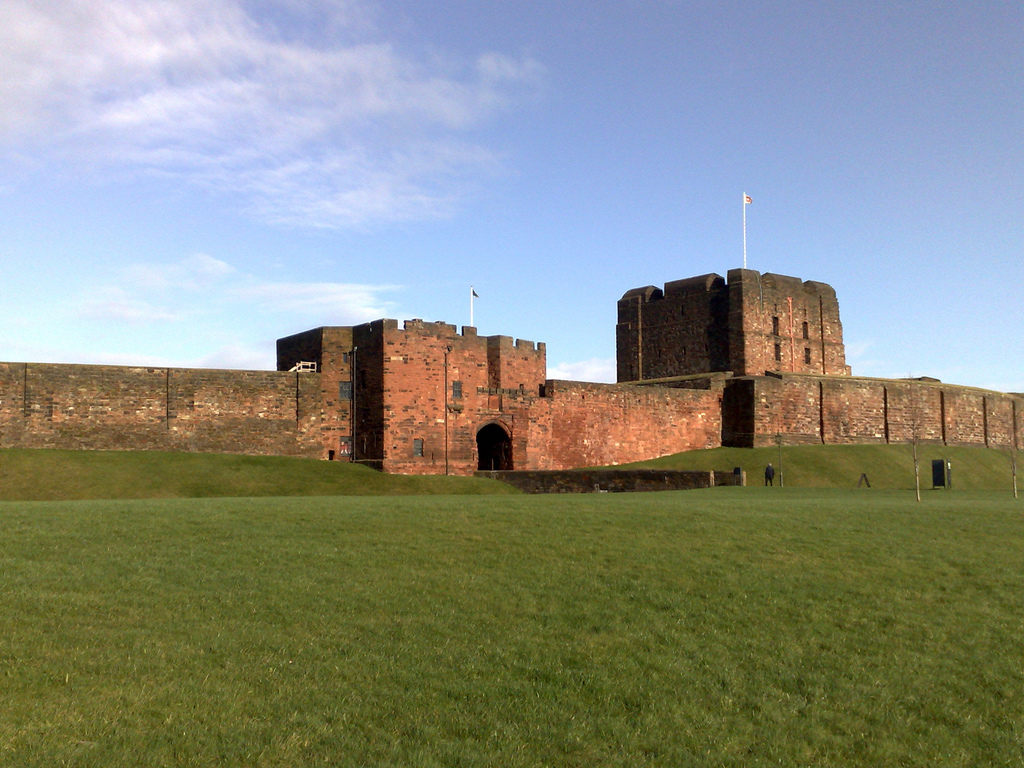
- Carlisle Castle, modern day
Date	22 July to 1 August 1315
Location	Carlisle, England
Result	English victory

Belligerents
Kingdom of England	Kingdom of Scotland

Commanders and leaders
Sir Andrew Harclay	Robert the Bruce; James Douglas

Strength
Unknown	10,000

The siege of Carlisle took place from 22 July to 1 August 1315, during the First War of Scottish Independence, near the town of Carlisle, in Cumbria, England.

Following victory at Bannockburn in 1314, Robert the Bruce, King of Scotland, launched a series of raids into Northern England. Many areas along the Anglo-Scottish border were claimed by both Scotland and England, including Carlisle, which controlled access to North-West England.

Carlisle Castle was a strong position, defended by a garrison commanded by Andrew Harclay, 1st Earl of Carlisle, an experienced veteran soldier. Despite their battlefield victories, the Scots lacked the expertise or resources necessary to sustain a lengthy siege; after failing to breach the walls, they withdrew on 1 August.

Victory played an important part in Harclay's rise to prominence; he was later created Earl of Carlisle, before being executed in 1323.

== Background ==
=== Carlisle ===
The city of Carlisle and its castle was the western headquarters of the Scottish Marches, a buffer zone created along the Anglo-Scottish border. It controlled access to North West England, as Berwick did the North East, making it strategically important in the confrontations between Scotland and England. Previously held by the Scots, Berwick was captured by Edward I in 1296, and frequently changed hands until 1482, while Carlisle was besieged seven times between 1171 and 1461, the 1315 siege being among the most determined.

Carlisle was first fortified in 72 CE, when a timber and earth Roman fort was built there; in 1092, William II of England constructed a stone castle on the same site, subsequently expanded by his successors.

=== Scottish Wars of Independence ===
The death of Alexander III in 1286, followed by his granddaughter Margaret, Maid of Norway in 1290, left thirteen claimants to the throne of Scotland. They agreed to allow Edward I of England to arbitrate, and in return accepted his claim of superior lordship over Scotland. However, his selection of John Balliol as king of Scotland was resisted by his rivals; when Edward attempted to exert his authority, Balliol was deposed and the Scots allied with France with France against England.

Edward responded by invading Scotland in 1296, initially defeating the Scottish opposition, and starting the First War of Scottish Independence. Despite successes under William Wallace, the Scottish would find themselves still fighting the English in 1314 when Robert the Bruce, now King of Scotland, defeated Edward II of England at Bannockburn, uniting the nation under his leadership.

Raids into Northern England, which had started in 1311 continued after Bannockburn. The exception at Carlisle may show that the Scottish were growing overconfident, or may have been part of a concerted plan to take the strategic border castles of Carlisle and Berwick. Aside from capturing castles, these expeditions into England were also intended to force Edward II to recognise Scottish independence.

== Siege ==
=== English forces ===
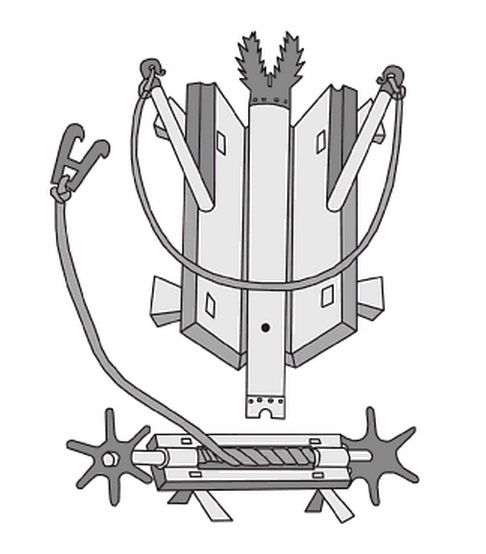
Springalds were used to throw large bolts at the besiegers.

Expecting Carlisle to be attacked following their defeat at Bannockburn, the English had strengthened the garrison there, and six months prior to the siege Andrew Harclay, as governor of the castle, commanded a few hundred regular soldiers. These would have been reinforced by men from the surrounding area seeking shelter within the walls. It is probable that Harclay and his men would have fought at Bannockburn the year before, and would have gained experience from border skirmishes with Scotland. The defenders were equipped with catapults and springalds capable of throwing large bolts and rocks down on to the besiegers.

=== Scottish forces ===
Led by their king, Robert the Bruce, the Scottish army had proven themselves in battle at Bannockburn the year before, but were inexperienced in the art of siegecraft. Bruce's preferred tactics when taking a castle usually involved small, covert attacks at night to take the garrison by surprise. An exception was the siege of Edinburgh, when a large diversionary force provided cover for a smaller company to make it over the wall.

Over the course of the siege of Carlisle the Scottish employed siege equipment typical of the era.

=== Conduct of the siege ===
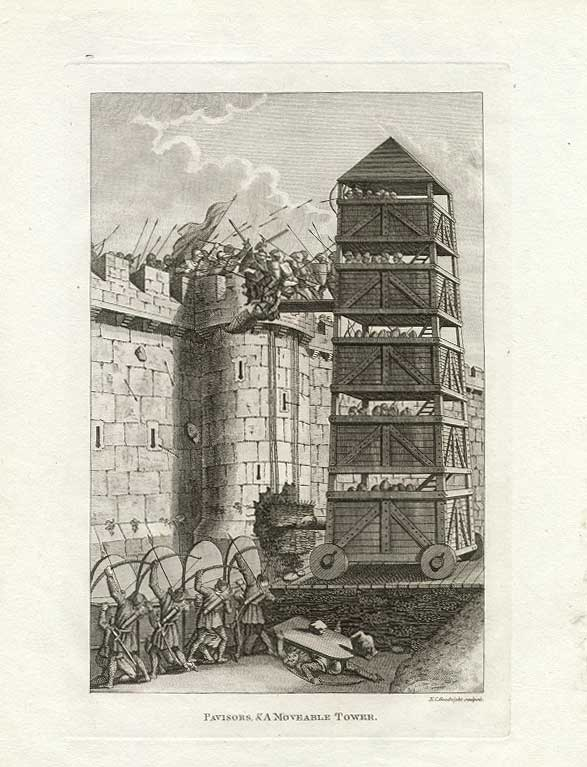
Medieval siege tower

Bruce arrived outside Carlisle on 22 July, and started by destroying the suburbs and spoiling the local crops. The Scots first attacked the gates, but they were thrown back after sustaining heavy losses; they then constructed a catapult, which proved unable to do much damage.

They then built a siege tower and filled the castle moat with hay and other materials, in order to attack the walls directly. Both approaches were defeated by the weather, with the tower getting stuck, and the material filling the ditch being washed away. Attempts to gain entrance to the castle using long ladders, bridges over the moat, and the use of a sow, a mobile shelter used to provide protection to sappers trying to undermine the walls, would all come to no avail.

In a last effort to take the castle, Bruce adopted the tactics used to capture Edinburgh, launching diversionary attacks while James Douglas attacked the walls from a previously unassaulted side. This too failed, and the siege ended on 1 August when the Scots withdrew, either in response to the rumoured approach of a relief column, or news of a defeat suffered by Edward Bruce in Ireland.

== Aftermath ==
=== Continued Scottish raids ===
Despite their defeat in 1315, the Scots continued their attacks and besieged Carlisle again in 1316; these raids proved extremely lucrative, the people of northern England paying to avoid being attacked. They continued until 1322 when Edward II agreed a truce, although they were briefly restarted in 1327. The war ended in 1328 when Edward III of England signed the Treaty of Edinburgh–Northampton accepting Scottish independence.

=== Andrew Harclay ===
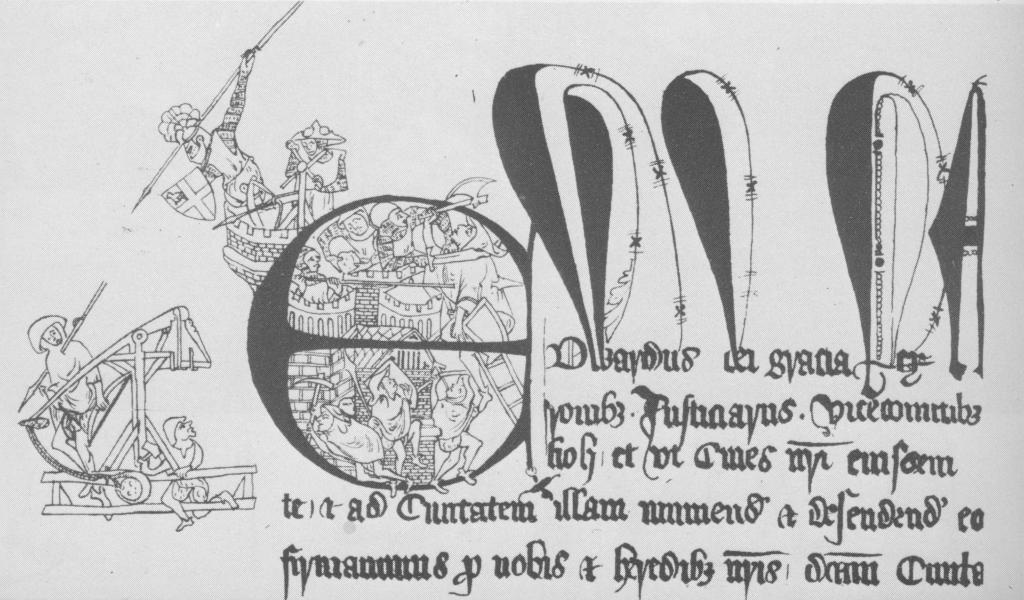
Detail from Royal charter awarded to Carlisle; Andrew Harclay throwing spears at the soldiers below

Following the siege, Andrew Harclay received 1000 marks from King Edward for his service. His position as Sheriff of Cumberland was confirmed, while the town received a Royal charter; however, he was captured by Bruce late in 1315 and had to pay 2000 marks ransom. In 1319, Edward II appointed him Warden of the Western March, and in 1322 Earl of Carlisle.

During the 1321 to 1322 Despenser War, Harclay led Royalist forces in the north; at the decisive Battle of Boroughbridge in March 1322, he deployed his infantry in the Scottish schiltron formation. The rebel forces were commanded by two of the most powerful noblemen in England, Thomas of Lancaster and the Earl of Hereford. Hereford was killed, Lancaster and another forty beheaded, while the Welsh leader Roger Mortimer was banished and deprived of his lands. This gained Harclay many enemies, and he was executed for treason in 1323, allegedly for attempting to make peace with Bruce.

== Sources ==
- BBC. "The Battle of Bannockburn, 1314". BBC History. BBC.
- Brindle, Steven. "History of Carlisle Castle". English Heritage.
- Britannica. "Scotland – The Wars of Independence". Encyclopedia Britannica. Encyclopedia Britannica, Inc.
- Crome, Sarah (1999). Scotland's First War of Independence. Sarah Crome. ISBN 978-0-9536316-0-5.
- DeVries, Kelly (2006). Infantry Warfare in the Early Fourteenth Century: Discipline, Tactics, and Technology. Boydell & Brewer Ltd. ISBN 978-0-85115-571-5.
- Fryde, Natalie (2004). The Tyranny and Fall of Edward II 1321-1326. Cambridge University Press. ISBN 978-0-521-54806-9.
- History Scotland (2019). "The Border Lordships 1500-1600". History Scotland.
- McNamee, Colin (2010). Rogers, Clifford J. (ed.). The Oxford encyclopedia of medieval warfare and military technology, volume 1. Oxford University Press. ISBN 9780195334036.
- McNamee, Colm (2012). The Wars of the Bruces: Scotland, England and Ireland 1306 - 1328. Birlinn. ISBN 978-0-85790-495-9.
- Morris, Marc (2008). A Great and Terrible King; Edward I and the Forging of Britain. Windmill Books. ISBN 978-0099481751.
- Oman, Charles (1904). A History of England. Edward Arnold.
- Purton, Peter (2010). A History of the Late Medieval Siege, 1200-1500. Boydell & Brewer. ISBN 978-1-84383-449-6.
- Scott, Ronald McNair (2014). Robert the Bruce, King of Scots. Canongate Books. ISBN 978-1-84767-746-4.
- Summerson, Henry. "The Rise and Fall of Andrew Harclay". English Heritage.
- Summerson, Henry (2004). "Harclay [Harcla], Andrew, Earl of Carlisle (c. 1270–1323)". Oxford Dictionary of National Biography (online ed.). Oxford University Press. doi:10.1093/ref:odnb/12235. (Subscription, Wikipedia Library access or UK public library membership required.)

== Bibliography ==
- Maxwell, Charles Alfred (1870). English and Scottish Chivalry: Tales from Authentic Chronicles and Histories. Edinburgh: W.P. Nimmo. pp. 68–72.
- Tout, Thomas Frederick (1890). "Harclay, Andrew" . In Stephen, Leslie; Lee, Sidney (eds.). Dictionary of National Biography. Vol. 24. London: Smith, Elder & Co.
