= Winton, Cumbria =

Village and civil parish in Cumbria, England

Coordinates: 54.489°N 2.335°W

Winton
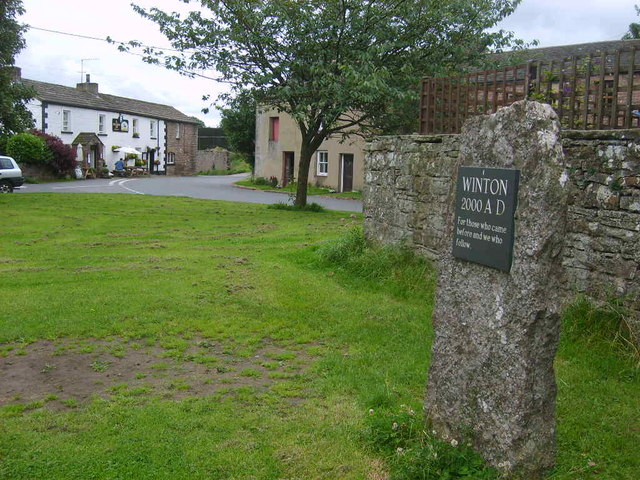
- Millennium Monument

- Location within Cumbria
- Population: 327 (2011(including Kaber))
- OS grid reference: NY7810
- Civil parish: Winton
- Unitary authority: Westmorland and Furness
- Ceremonial county: Cumbria
- Region: North West
- Country: England
- Sovereign state: United Kingdom
- Post town: KIRKBY STEPHEN
- Postcode district: CA17
- Dialling code: 01768
- Police: Cumbria
- Fire: Cumbria
- Ambulance: North West
- UK Parliament: Westmorland and Lonsdale

Winton is a village and civil parish in the Westmorland and Furness district of Cumbria, England. It is 2.9 miles (4.7 km) south of Brough, and 1.6 miles (2.6 km) north of Kirkby Stephen, and had a population of 213 at the 2001 Census. At the 2011 census Winton was grouped with Kaber giving a total population of 327. The word Winton is Old English or Anglo-Saxon in origin, Wyntuna meaning a pasture. Farmstead was first identified in 1094, shortly after the Norman Conquest, during a period known as the 'Harrying of the North'. On 12 April 1659, the village of Winton was at the centre of the Westmorland witch trials, during which several women were hanged at Appleby General Sessions, found guilty of bewitching Margaret Bousefield.

During the Middle Ages Winton was at the centre of the sheep rearing in the Eden Valley, where the flocks moved across the hills into pastures new. More controversial was the part played by the Archbishop of York in dealing with invasions by Scots armies, raiding, looting and burning, sheep-stealing. On 5 October 1357 the local bishop was required to accept the redemption of King David Bruce of Scotland, for the Suffragan Michael of York held sway in the mountains of the West March.

Both Kirkby Stephen and the village of Winton had a grammar school each, where its major benefactor was a Cambridge educated teacher. Richard Burn helped found the free school that took all children from the neighbouring parishes.

== Notable people ==
- John Langhorne (poet)
- Richard Burn, school benefactor

== See also ==
- Listed buildings in Winton, Cumbria
- List of English and Welsh endowed schools (19th century)
