= Siege of Carlisle (1644) =

Siege of Carlisle during the First English Civil War

Coordinates: 54.89726°N 2.941936°W

- Part of the First English Civil War
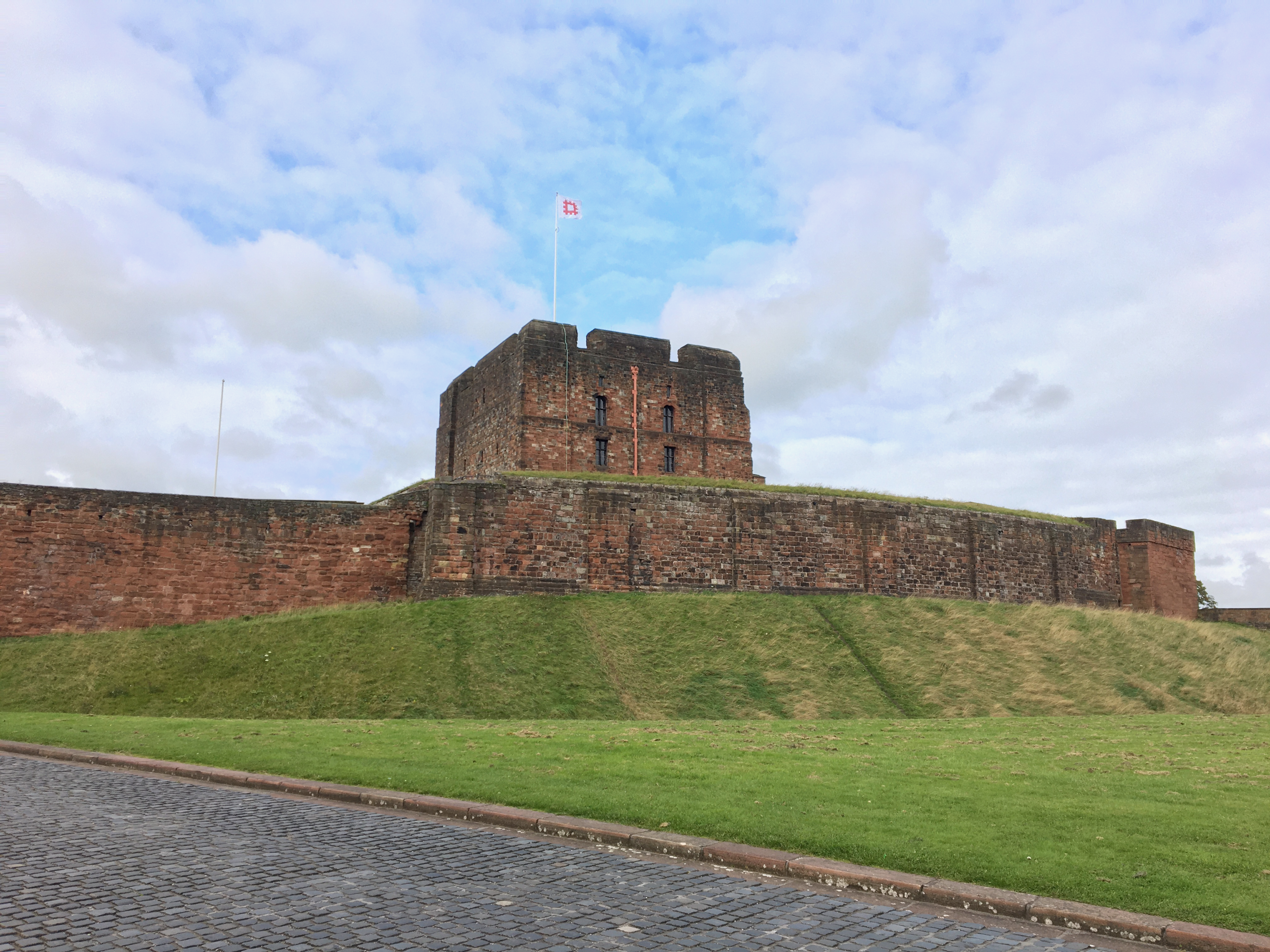
- Carlisle Castle
| Date | October 1644 – 25 June 1645 |
| Location | Carlisle, Cumbria, North West England, England |
| Result | Covenanter/Parliamentarian Victory |

Belligerents
| Covenanters; Parliamentarians | Royalists |

Commanders and leaders
| Earl of Leven | Sir Thomas Glennam; Sir Henry Shadling |

Strength
| 4,000 | 700 |

Casualties and losses
| Low | Low |

Northern England and Carlisle

The siege of Carlisle occurred during the First English Civil War when the allied forces of the Scottish Covenanters and the English Parliamentarians besieged Carlisle Castle which was held at the time by the English Royalist forces loyal to King Charles I. The siege took place in Carlisle, Cumbria from October 1644 to 25 June 1645.

== Background ==
For 500 years, Carlisle Castle served as the principal fortress of England's north-western border with Scotland. In 1642 at the start of the First English Civil War, the castle was held and garrisoned by Royalist forces. Because of its location far to the north of England, the castle remained under the control of the Royalists for the first two years of the civil war.

On 2 July 1644, the combined forces of the Covenanters and the Parliamentarians decisively defeated the Royalists at the Battle of Marston Moor near York. The Royalists lost 5,500 men along with all their ordinance, gunpowder, and supplies. Two weeks later the besieged city of York surrendered. The commander of the Royalist northern army, the Marquis of Newcastle, and other senior officers fled the country in embarrassment. As a result, the Royalist no longer had an army in the north.

After the Parliamentarian victory at Marston Moor, Alexander Leslie who commanded the Covenanters began a campaign in the north to capture Royalist garrisons and urban centers. By 15 August, Leslie's Covenanter army had reached the important port city of Newcastle and resumed a siege that had ended unsuccessfully the previously February.

== The siege ==
After the surrender of Newcastle on 27 October 1644, Leslie took 4,000 of his Covenanters, composed of both infantry and cavalry, to Carlisle and began the siege of the walled city and fortress. He quartered his force in the villages surrounding Carlisle and erected siege works on the four major roads leading to the city. The siege works blocking the road from the north was placed in the churchyard at the village of Stanwix and included three small cannons. All the other siege works seemed to simply be fortifications designed to hold 60 to 100 cavalry riders. Together the four siege works blocked access to the city and castle from all four directions of the compass.

This initial encirclement of Carlisle was not particularly confining to the Royalists as it left a substantial amount of grazing ground for cattle and horses outside the walls of the city. Leslie, however, didn't seem to be in a hurry to take the garrison. For approximately six months, Leslie seemed content to sit and wait. All that while, the Covenanters never attacked the city. During that time the primary action between the two opposing forces were skirmishes that took place when the Royalist would sally outside the city walls to procure cattle and provisions.

In the spring, the Covenanter forces were joined by Parliamentarian forces. About that time, at the end of April, Leslie began to move his siege works closer to the city and to erect additional fortifications. The contraction of the siege perimeter slowly reduced the number of successful sallies the Royalists were able to conduct diminishing their food supplies. Starvation set in on the garrison causing the besieged Royalist to eat whatever they could including horses, dogs and rats. Finally in the summer of 1645, King Charles and his Royalist army lost another major battle at Naseby. Out of provisions with a diminished hope of relief, the Royalist garrison at Carlisle Castle surrendered on 25 June 1645.

== Aftermath ==
The terms of the "Articles of Agreement for the Surrender of Carlisle Castle" included the following provisions:

- The castle, city, and Citadel of Carlisle along with all forts, towers, canons, ammunition, and furniture shall be surrendered to Lieutenant General Leslie.
- Sir Thomas Glennam, Sir Henry Stradling, their officers and men shall be allowed to march out of Carlisle as free men with their colours flying and drums beating. They shall be allowed to leave Carlisle with their firearms, bags, baggage, and twelve charges of powder each. They shall be allowed to march from Carlisle to join their King without the fear of being attacked.
- The people of Carlisle shall not be harmed, nor shall their homes be looted or destroyed.
