= Richard Dowdeswell =

Richard Dowdeswell may refer to:

- Richard Dowdeswell (died 1673), MP for Tewkesbury 1660–1673
- Richard Dowdeswell (died 1711), MP for Tewkesbury 1685–1710
