= Sir Gilfrid Lawson, 6th Baronet =

English lawyer and Tory politician

Sir Gilfrid Lawson, 6th Baronet (1675–1749), of Brayton Hall, Cumbria, was an English lawyer and Tory politician who sat in the English House of Commons between 1701 and 1705 and in the British House of Commons from 1708 to 1734.

== Background ==
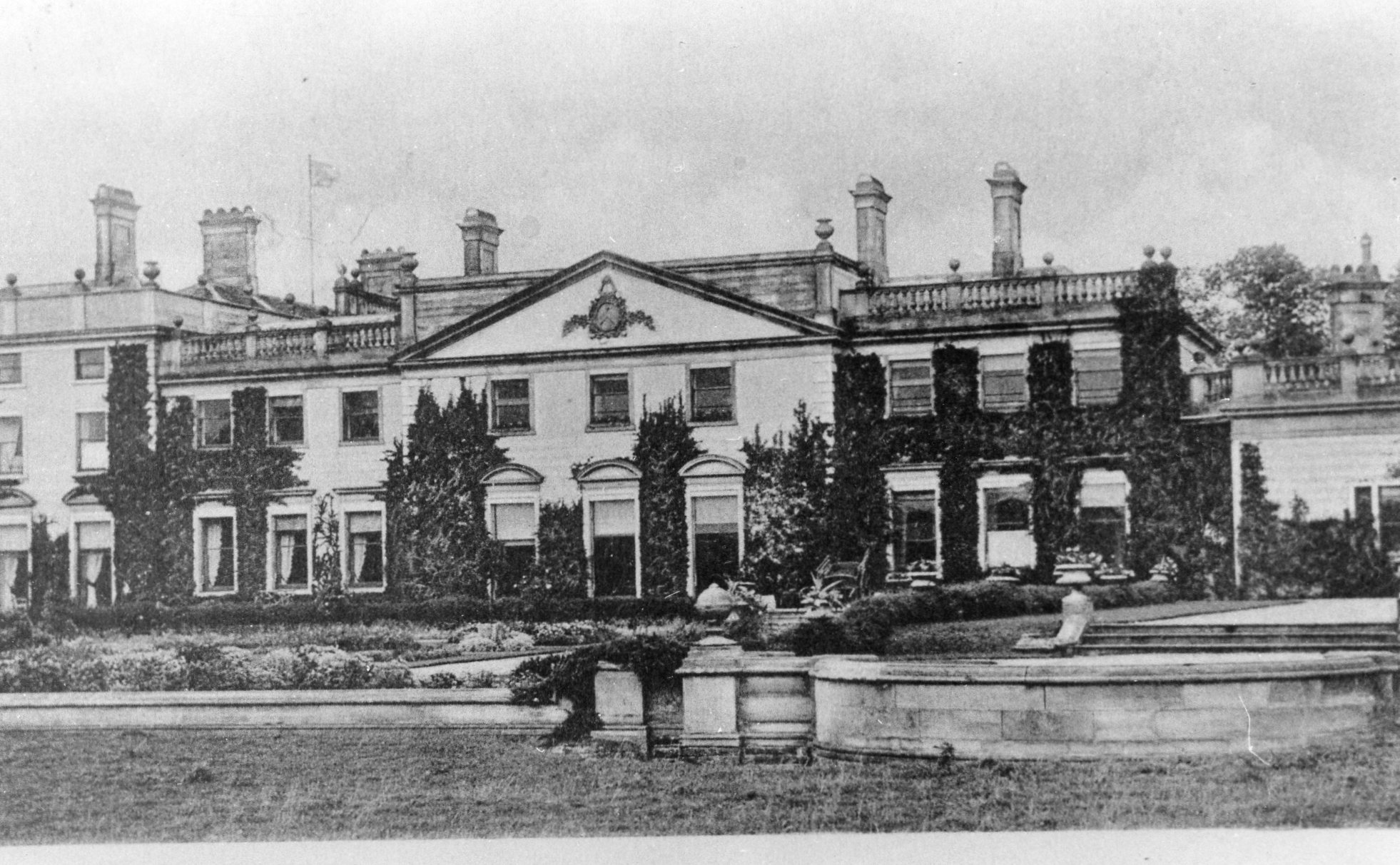
Brayton Hall in 1900

Lawson was the son of Wilfred Lawson of Brayton, Cumberland and his wife Sarah James, daughter of William James of Washington, county Durham. His father was a younger son of Sir Wilfrid Lawson, 1st Baronet, of Isell who left him Brayton, while the elder son was left the baronetcy and Isel Hall. Lawson matriculated at Queen's College, Oxford on 19 October 1695 and was admitted at Gray's Inn in 1700. He was called to the bar in 1702. In 1710 he succeeded his father to Brayton.

== Career ==
Lawson was returned unopposed as Member of Parliament for Cumberland at the first general election of 1701 in February, but did not stand in the second general election of the year in November. He was elected in a contest at Cumberland at the 1702 general election defeating his cousin, Sir Wilfred Lawson. He decided not to stand in 1705 but was returned unopposed at the 1708 general election. He was returned unopposed again in 1710 and 1713. He was a moderate Tory, and a member of the October Club. At the 1715 general election he was returned unopposed at Cumberland and voted consistently against the Government. In parliament he was plain Mr Lawson and two parliamentary speeches are recorded in the parliamentary proceedings (Hansard began in 1803). On 4 April 1717, after James Stanhope had offended several members after moving that parliament grant the King supplies to subsidise foreign powers, Lawson declared that no one but ‘such as ... were not the King’s friends’ could refuse to support the vote of credit for measures against Sweden. He further said that if a Member must be accounted an enemy to the King when he happens not to fall in with his ministers ... they had nothing else to do but to retire to their country seats. According to records, Lawson's inflammatory response accused the speaker of ‘interfering with freedom of debate’. An extract from Tindal's England (Vol 2) records:

"...that he was surprised to hear such unguarded expressions fall from so respectable a person, and that if every member of the House who used Freedpom of Speech must be accounted an enemy to the King whenever he happened to disapprove of the measures of his Ministers, he knew no service they could render to their country in that House, and it were better at once to retire to their country seats, and leave the King and his Ministers to act entirely at their discretion."

On 15 Dec. 1720 he attacked the South Sea Company directors, and four days later he seconded Sir Joseph Jekyll’s motion for a select committee of the Commons to inquire into the affairs of the Company. He was returned as MP for Cumberland in a contest at the 1722 general election. On 6 April 1723, he opposed the bill of pains and penalties against Francis Atterbury on the grounds of insufficiency of evidence. He was returned unopposed at the 1727 general election. No further speeches by Lawson are reported till 1730, when he spoke in favour of removing the duty on salt, as most affecting the poor. He also spoke against the removal of the duty on Irish yarn, and against the wool bill in 1731. At the 1734 general election, he retired, giving his interest to his first cousin once removed, Sir Joseph Pennington, having ‘broke with all other considerable people in the county’.

== Later life and legacy ==
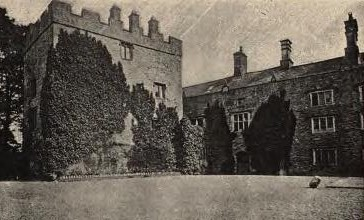
Isel Hall in 1892

Lawson succeeded his cousin Sir Mordaunt Lawson, 5th Baronet to the baronetcy and to the Isel estate on 8 August 1743. He died unmarried on 23 August 1749 and the title passed to his brother Alfred.

After Alfred's death in 1752, his eldest son Wilfrid received the title. Sir Wilfrid Lawson, 8th Baronet (1712–63) became Sheriff of Cumberland in 1756. In 1761, he entered Parliament for the Cumberland constituency after James Lowther, 1st Earl of Lonsdale who had been returned for that constituency, and for Westmorland, preferred to sit for the latter. Sir Wilfrid died in 1763, with no issue and the baronetcy passed to his brother Sir Gilfrid Lawson, 9th Baronet.

== Bibliography ==
- R. S. Ferguson (1871). Cumberland & Westmorland M.P.'s From The Restoration To The Reform Bill Of 1867 (1660-1867). Carlisle.

Parliament of England
Preceded by Sir John Lowther, Bt; Sir George Fletcher, Bt	Member of Parliament for Cumberland; 1701; With: Richard Musgrave	Succeeded by Sir Edward Hasell; George Fletcher
Preceded by Sir Edward Hasell; George Fletcher	Member of Parliament for Cumberland; 1702–1705; With: Richard Musgrave	Succeeded by Richard Musgrave; George Fletcher
Parliament of Great Britain
Preceded by Richard Musgrave; George Fletcher	Member of Parliament for Cumberland; 1708–1734; With: James Lowther 1708-1722; Sir Christopher Musgrave, Bt 1722-1727; James Lowther 1727-1734	Succeeded by James Lowther; Sir Joseph Pennington, Bt
Baronetage of England
Preceded by Sir Mordaunt Lawson, 5th Baronet	Baronet (of Isell); 1743-1749	Succeeded by Sir Alfred Lawson, 7th Baronet
