= George Fletcher (politician) =

George Fletcher (circa 1666 – circa March 1708) was the eldest son of Sir George Fletcher, 2nd Baronet by his second wife Mary, daughter of James Johnstone, 1st Earl of Hartfell. From a local Whig family, he represented the borough of Cockermouth in the Parliament of England from 1698 to 1701 and the county of Cumberland from 1701 to 1702 and then from 1705 to his death. He died without issue, so the baronetcy became extinct on the death of his elder half-brother Sir Henry Fletcher, 3rd Bt.

Parliament of England
Preceded by Sir Charles Gerard, Bt; Goodwin Wharton	Member of Parliament for Cockermouth; 1698–1701; With: William Seymour	Succeeded by William Seymour; Thomas Lamplugh
Preceded by Richard Musgrave; Gilfrid Lawson	Member of Parliament for Cumberland; 1701–1702; With: Sir Edward Hasell	Succeeded by Richard Musgrave; Gilfrid Lawson
Preceded by Richard Musgrave; Gilfrid Lawson	Member of Parliament for Cumberland; 1705–1707; With: Richard Musgrave	Succeeded by Parliament of Great Britain
Parliament of Great Britain
Preceded by Parliament of England	Member of Parliament for Cumberland; 1707–1708; With: Richard Musgrave	Succeeded by James Lowther; Gilfrid Lawson
