= Richard Dowdeswell (died 1673) =

Richard Dowdeswell (before 24 February 1601 – 25 March 1673) was an English landowner who, after being an active Royalist in the English Civil War, sat in the House of Commons from 1660 until his death.

== Origins ==
Probably born and certainly baptised at his mother's home village of Eastleach Martin, Gloucestershire, he was the eldest son of Roger Dowdeswell, and his wife Martha, daughter of Richard Blomer. His father was a landowner who acquired various estates: Hill House in 1606, Oxeye and Frogmore in 1609, and finally in 1628 Pull Court at Bushley, Worcestershire, which became the family home for generations. His younger brother William (1609–1671) became a clergyman.

== Career ==
In 1633 he inherited his father's estates. With the outbreak of civil war, he rallied to the Royalist cause and in 1642 was sent for by the House of Commons as a delinquent and ordered to be kept in safe custody. On the king's behalf he was an active commissioner of array at Worcester in 1642, and in 1643 and 1644 assisted the king with men and money. In 1644 he was one of the guards at the garrison of Tewkesbury. He was said to have sent horses and servants to help the Scottish army in 1651. He was called on 24 November 1652 to show why his estate should not be sequestered.

At the Restoration, he was elected Member of Parliament for Tewkesbury in the Convention Parliament of 1660. He was re-elected in 1661 as MP for Tewkesbury in the Cavalier Parliament and sat until his death in 1673. Through his efforts, Tewkesbury received in 1672 an exemplification of the charter granted by James I.

He died in 1673 at the age of 72 and has a monument at Bushley.

== Family ==
In 1628 he married Anne, daughter of Sir Charles Pleydell, of Lydiard Tregoze in Wiltshire, and his first wife Catherine Bourchier. Two of his brothers-in-law were also MPs, William Pleydell and John Pleydell. His wife outlived him, dying in 1680 and being buried with him at Bushley. Of their children, his heir was William (died 1683) who served as High Sheriff of Worcestershire in 1678 and was father of the politician Richard Dowdeswell.

Parliament of England
Preceded by Not represented in Restored Rump	Member of Parliament for Tewkesbury; 1660–1673; With: Henry Capell	Succeeded by Henry Capell; Sir Francis Russell, 2nd Bt
