= Orlando Gee =

English MP for Cockermouth

Sir Orlando Gee (c.1619 - 1705 ) was an English member of parliament, serving as joint MP for the Cockermouth constituency from March 1679 to March 1681, 1685 to 1687 and 1690 to 1695.

== Life ==
He was the fourth son of Sarah Mogridge and her husband John Gee (died 1631), the latter being parish priest of Dunsford, Devon, making Orlando brother to the cleric and anti-Catholic writer John Gee. In the 1650s he began to ally himself with the House of Percy in general and Charles Seymour, 6th Duke of Somerset in particular. His first marriage on 18 May 1662 was to Elizabeth Maxey, widowed daughter of Sir William Maxey of Bradwell-next-Coggeshall in Essex. In September 1660 he became joint registrar to the Admiralty Court, a post he held until becoming sole registrar two years later, holding the latter post until his death. That post and his first election as MP in 1690 both resulted from his alliance with the Percys.

On 18 August 1682 he was knighted and on 7 August the same year he married a second time to Anne Chilcot, heir and daughter to Robert Chilcot of Isleworth. Both marriages were without issue. His only notable intervention in the House of Commons during his first term was to safeguard his own business interests in two paper mills in Buckinghamshire from a perceived threat from a bill promoting production of white paper, but neither of two clauses moved to mitigate this passed the House. He went on to be appointed to draft bills regarding the militia and preventing escapes from the King's Bench Prison and Fleet Prison.

Few speeches by him survive, all from the 1692–1693 session of Parliament and all demonstrating his support for the Court faction. He opposed attempts to replace the Admiralty commissioners in a 21 November 1692 debate and seconded a motion on 19 January the following year that the 6th Duke of Somerset's chaplain give the annual sermon commemorating the execution of Charles I. He initially supported the Triennial Bill but had turned against it by the time of a speech on 2 February 1693 in which he stated it was "an invasion on the [royal] prerogative". He was granted indefinite leave of absence from Parliament due to poor health on 23 February 1694, retiring at the 1695 election and leaving legacies to charity totalling £10,000 in his will, including £500 to rebuild All Saints' Church, Isleworth.

He died in 1705 and is buried in All Saints Church in Isleworth with a monument by Francis Bird.

Parliament of England
Preceded by Sir Richard Grahme and Sir Wilfrid Lawson	Member of Parliament for Cockermouth; 1679–1681 and 1685-1687; With: Sir Richard Grahme (1679-1681) / Sir Daniel Fleming (1685-1687)	Succeeded by Sir Henry Capell and Henry Fletcher
Preceded by Sir Henry Capell and Henry Fletcher	Member of Parliament for Cockermouth; 1690-1695; With: Sir Wilfrid Lawson	Succeeded by Sir Charles Gerard and Goodwin Wharton
