= Lord Preston =

Lord Preston may refer to:

- Thomas Preston, 1st Viscount Tara (1585–1655), an Irish soldier of the 17th century.
- Richard Graham, 1st Viscount Preston (1648–1695), a courtier at the Court of Charles II of England and English ambassador to Paris. After the Glorious Revolution he conspired with other Jacobite conspirators

See also

- Frederick Stanley, 16th Earl of Derby (1841–1908), known as Frederick Stanley until 1886 and as Lord Stanley of Preston between 1886 and 1893, was a Conservative Party politician in the United Kingdom who served as Colonial Secretary from 1885 to 1886 and the sixth Governor General of Canada from 1888 to 1893.
