= Henry Capell, Baron Capell of Tewkesbury =

English politician (1638–1696)

The Right Honorable The Lord Capell of Tewkesbury KB PC
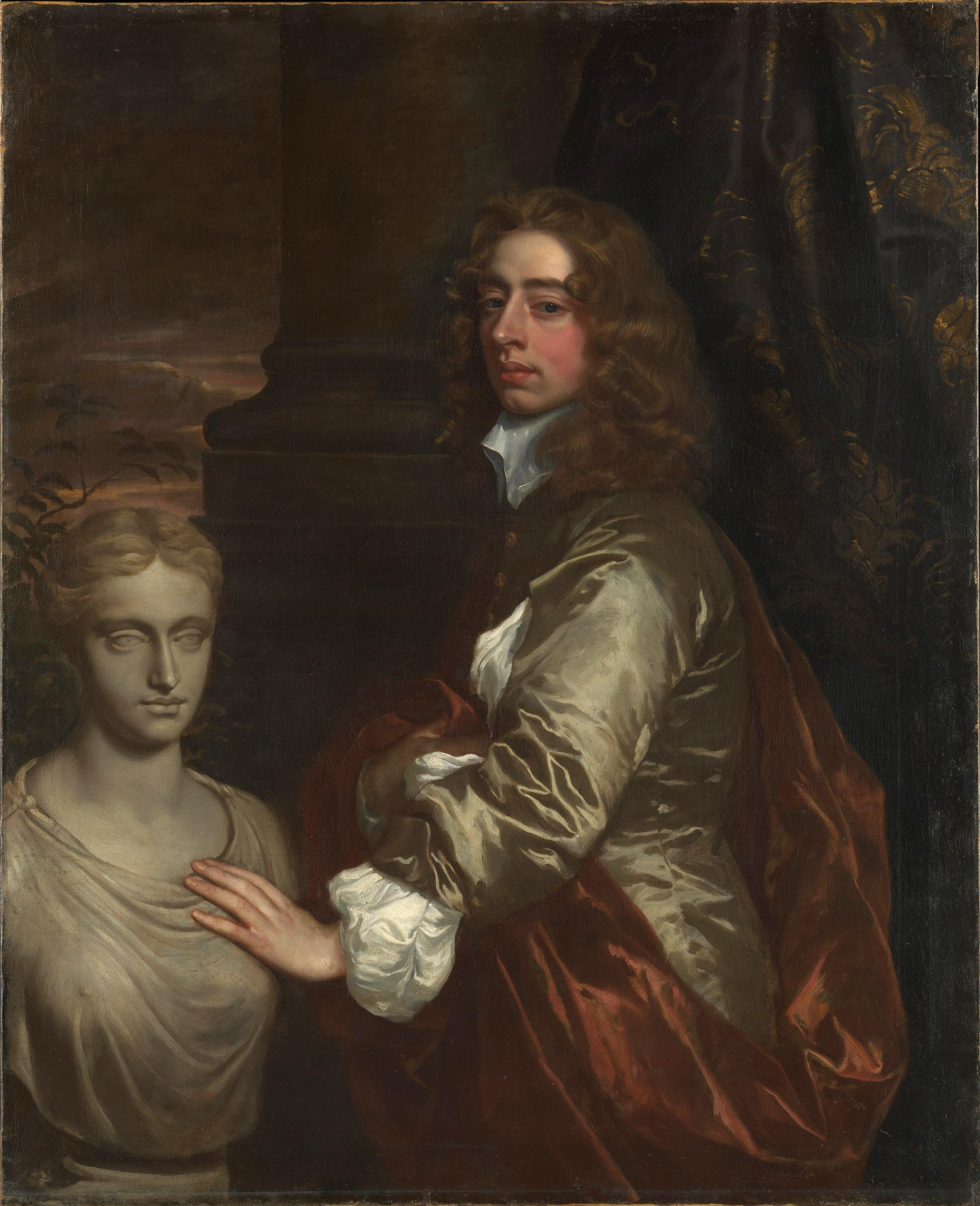
- Portrait by Peter Lely

First Lord of the Admiralty
- In office 1679–1681
- Preceded by: Prince Rupert of the Rhine
- Succeeded by: The Earl of Nottingham

Member of Parliament for Tewkesbury
- In office 1660–1685
- Monarch: Charles II

Personal details
- Born: 1638 Little Hadham, Hertfordshire
- Died: 30 May 1696 (aged 57–58) Chapelizod, County Dublin
- Spouse(s): Dorothy Bennet (m. 1659)

Henry Capell, Baron Capell of Tewkesbury, KB, PC (1638 – 30 May 1696) was an English politician who sat in the House of Commons between 1660 and 1692. He was then created Baron Capell.

== Early life ==
Henry Capell was born in Hadham Parva, Hertfordshire. He was the son of Arthur Capell, 1st Baron Capell of Hadham and Elizabeth Morrison. He was baptised on 6 March 1638. His father was raised to the peerage in 1641 and he died fighting for the King in the civil wars in 1649 as one of the commanders of the Colchester garrison. Henry's eldest brother was Arthur Capell, 1st Earl of Essex.

== Career ==
Capell's exotic garden at Kew Park was the foundation for what was to become Royal Botanic Gardens at Kew. Later Capel was elected Member of Parliament for Tewkesbury in the Convention Parliament. He was invested as a Knight of the Order of the Bath, on 23 April 1661. In 1661, he was re-elected MP for Tewkesbury in the Cavalier Parliament. He was a member of the Irish Privy Council, from April 1673 to March 1684/85. Capell was re-elected MP for Tewkesbury in the two elections of 1679, was a member of the English Privy Council, from 22 April 1679 to 31 January 1680, and was First Lord of the Admiralty, between 14 May 1679 and 19 February 1681.

In 1689, Capell was elected MP for Cockermouth and was Lord of the Treasury, between 1689 and 1690. He was invested again as Privy Councillor, on 14 February 1689. He was elected MP for Tewkesbury in 1690, and sat until 11 April 1692, when he was ennobled as Baron Capell of Tewkesbury, in the County of Gloucester. One year later, he became Lord Justice of Ireland and in turn a Privy Councillor of Ireland, in June 1693. In 1695 and 1696, Capell was Lord Deputy of Ireland. His term as Lord Deputy was not considered successful because of him being a firm Whig and presiding over an administration which was deeply divided between Whigs and Tories, and he did nothing to help this situation change.

Capell died aged 58 in Chapelizod, County Dublin, and was buried on 8 September 1696 in Little Hadham, Hertfordshire. The barony died with him.

== Private life ==
On 16 February 1659, Capell married Dorothy Bennet, daughter of Richard Bennet. The marriage was childless, but did bring part of what later became Kew Palace into the Capell family, leading to its becoming known as Capel House.

Dorothy died in 1721, and through her will endowed a number of charities.

Parliament of England
Preceded by Not represented in Restored Rump	Member of Parliament for Tewkesbury; 1660–1685; With: Richard Dowdeswell (1) 1660–1673; Sir Francis Russell, Bt 1673–1685	Succeeded by Richard Dowdeswell (2); Sir Francis Russell, Bt
Preceded by Sir Daniel Fleming; Sir Orlando Gee	Member of Parliament for Cockermouth; 1689–1690; With: Henry Fletcher	Succeeded by Sir Wilfrid Lawson; Sir Orlando Gee
Preceded by Richard Dowdeswell (2); Sir Francis Russell, Bt	Member of Parliament for Tewkesbury; 1690–1692; With: Richard Dowdeswell (2)	Succeeded by Richard Dowdeswell (2); Sir Francis Winnington
Political offices
Preceded by Prince Rupert of the Rhine (Lord High Admiral)	First Lord of the Admiralty; 1679–1681	Succeeded by The Earl of Nottingham
Preceded by Lords Justices	Lord Deputy of Ireland; 1695–1696	Succeeded by Lords Justices
