= Sir Richard Musgrave, 3rd Baronet, of Hayton Castle =

English baronet and politician

Sir Richard Musgrave, 3rd Baronet (c. 1675 – 11 October 1711) was an English baronet and politician.

He was a Member of Parliament (MP) for Cumberland in 1701, and from 1702 to 1708.

He succeeded to the baronetcy, of Hayton Castle, in 1710.

Parliament of England
Preceded by Sir George Fletcher, Bt; Sir John Lowther, Bt	Member of Parliament for Cumberland; 1701; With: Gilfrid Lawson	Succeeded by George Fletcher; Sir Edward Hasell
Preceded by George Fletcher; Sir Edward Hasell	Member of Parliament for Cumberland; 1702 – 1707; With: Gilfrid Lawson 1702–05; George Fletcher from 1705	Succeeded by Parliament of Great Britain
Parliament of Great Britain
Preceded by Parliament of England	Member of Parliament for Cumberland; 1707 – 1708; With: George Fletcher	Succeeded by James Lowther; Gilfrid Lawson
Baronetage of Nova Scotia
Preceded by Richard Musgrave	Baronet (of Hayton Castle); 1710 – 1711	Succeeded by Richard Musgrave
