= Wilfrid Lawson (MP for Cockermouth) =

English politician

Wilfrid Lawson (ca. 1636 – after 1679) of Brayton Hall, Cumberland was an English politician who sat in the House of Commons in 1659 and 1660.

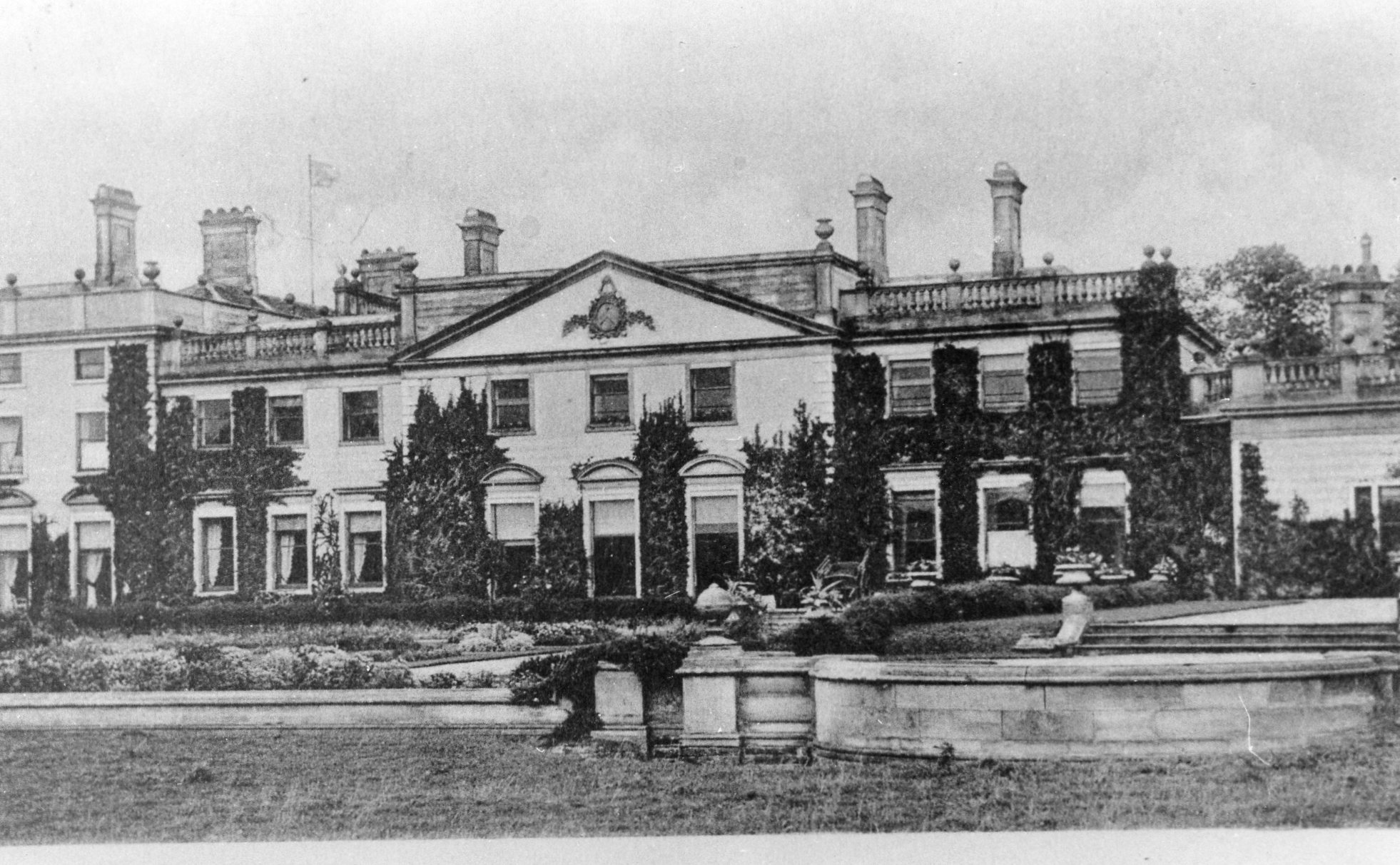
Brayton Hall in 1900

Lawson was the second son of Sir Wilfrid Lawson, 1st Baronet, of Isell and his wife Jane Musgrave, daughter of Sir Edward Musgrave, 1st Baronet of Hayton Castle

In 1659, Lawson was elected Member of Parliament for Cockermouth in the Third Protectorate Parliament. In 1660, he was re-elected MP for Cockermouth in the Convention Parliament. In 1678 he was appointed High Sheriff of Cumberland

Lawson's father conferred the estate of Brayton on him, so founding the Brayton line of Lawsons upon whom the baronetcy later descended in 1743 on the death of Sir Mordaunt Lawson, 5th Baronet of Isell.

Lawson died before his father. He had married Sarah, daughter of William James of Washington, County Durham. They had two sons, Gilfrid and Alfred.
