= John Ashton (Jacobite) =

English courtier and Jacobite conspirator

John Ashton (died 1691) was an English courtier and Jacobite conspirator.

== Life ==
Ashton was clerk of the closet to Mary of Modena, the wife of James II, and, after the revolution of 1688, showed himself ardently devoted to the interests of his exiled master and mistress. He appears to have held a commission of captain or major in the army, and to have been an intimate friend of Dr. Thomas Cartwright, who was bishop of Chester from 1686 to 1689, and a zealous supporter of the Stuart dynasty. By religion Ashton was a Protestant, and late in 1690 he attended a meeting of Protestant Jacobites, at which it was resolved to invite Louis XIV of France to forcibly restore James II.

Viscount Preston undertook to visit St. Germains with the papers requisite to obtain support for the conspiracy, and Ashton promised to arrange the journey and bear him company. He and a young friend, Major Elliott, hired a boat at London to convey themselves and Lord Preston to France, but the owner, whose suspicions were roused by their injunctions of secrecy, gave information to the government, and on 31 December 1690, when Preston, Ashton, and Elliott embarked with their treasonable papers about them at the Tower, they were narrowly watched, were arrested off Tilbury, and a few hours later brought back to Whitehall. On Ashton's person alone incriminating documents were found. The three prisoners were brought to trial a fortnight later, but each was tried separately. Ashton, who was described in the indictment as 'late of the parish of St. Paul's, Covent Garden,' declared that he was about to visit France to learn from the exiled queen how she proposed to settle certain unpaid debts with her London tradesmen, for many of which he, as her late clerk, was held responsible, and he called witnesses in support of his assertion. All the conspirators were, however, condemned to death, and Ashton, upon whom alone the sentence was executed, was hanged at Tyburn on 28 January 1691.

Several nonjuring clergymen attended him after his conviction, and were present with him at the gallows. Before his death he handed to the sheriff a paper declaring himself a Protestant, and happy in losing his life in James II's service, from whom he had received favours 'for sixteen years past.' This document, which well exemplified the depth of the sincerity of James's supporters in England, was published in England, France, and Holland, and greatly alarmed the authorities. An answer to it was written anonymously by Dr. Edward Fowler, bishop of Gloucester, who represented Ashton's paper as the manifesto of the Jacobite party, and tried to confute in detail his arguments against the lawfulness of William III's accession to the throne: the bishop's pamphlet evoked a reply in the 'Loyal Traitor,' an elaborate defence of Ashton by a Jacobite.

Ashton's widow, whose maiden name was Rigby, after her husband's death sought refuge at St. Germains with her son, upon whom James II conferred a baronetcy. But her Protestantism did not commend itself to the exiled court, and Mrs. Ashton was harshly used on her refusal to become a Roman Catholic. She died in 1694, and her body was sent to England for burial.
