= Sir Francis Russell, 2nd Baronet, of Wytley =

English politician

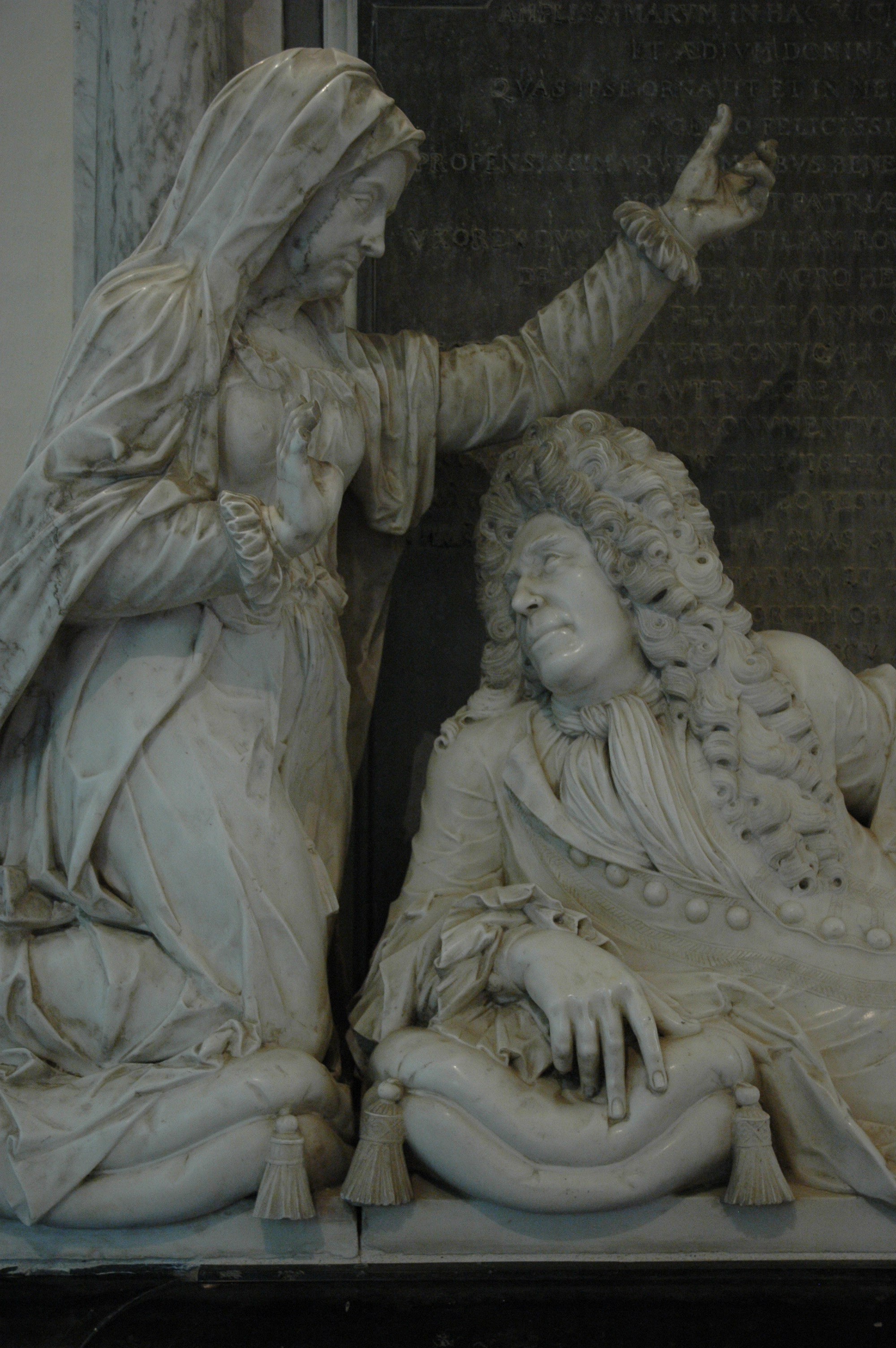
Memorial to Sir Francis Russell, Strensham Church by Edward Stanton

Sir Francis Russell, 2nd Baronet of Wytley (1637 – 24 January 1706) of Strensham Court, Worcestershire, was an English politician who sat in the House of Commons from 1673 to 1690.

Russell was the son of Sir William Russell, 1st Baronet of Strensham and his wife Frances Reade, daughter of Sir Thomas Reade, of Barton, Berkshire and his wife Mary Brockett, daughter of Sir John Brockett, of Brockett Hall, Hertfordshire. He succeeded to the baronetcy on 30 November 1669.

In 1673 he was elected Member of Parliament for Tewkesbury in the Cavalier Parliament. He was re-elected MP for Tewkesbury in the two elections of 1679, in 1681, in 1685 and in 1689.

Russell died at the age of 68 and was buried at Strensham on 2 February 1706. The tomb was designed by Edward Stanton.

Russell married by licence dated 8 July 1662, Anne Litton, daughter of Sir Rowland Litton, of Knebworth, Hertfordshire and his wife, Judith Edwards, daughter of Sir Humphrey Edwards, of London. He died without male issue and the Baronetcy became extinct. Strensham Court was left equally divided between his three daughters Anne, Mary and Elizabeth.

Parliament of England
Preceded by (Sir) Henry Capell; Richard Dowdeswell	Member of Parliament for Tewkesbury; 1673–1690; With: (Sir) Henry Capell 1673–1685; Richard Dowdeswell 1685–1690	Succeeded by Richard Dowdeswell; Sir Henry Capell
Baronetage of England
Preceded by William Russell	Baronet (of Wytley); 1669–1706	Extinct
