= Sir Christopher Musgrave, 5th Baronet =

English baronet and politician

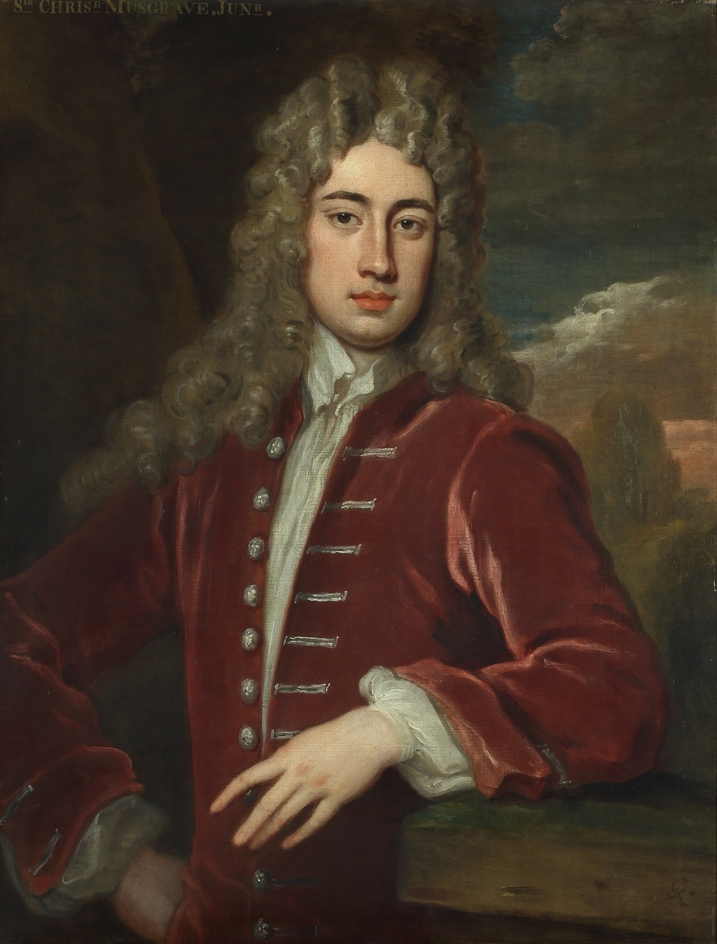
Portrait c.1715 by Godfrey Kneller

Sir Christopher Musgrave, 5th Baronet (25 December 1688 – 20 January 1736) of Eden Hall, Cumbria was an English baronet and politician.

He was born the son of Philip Musgrave and the grandson of Sir Christopher Musgrave, 4th Baronet. He succeeded his father in 1689 and his grandfather as 5th Baronet in 1704.

He was Clerk of the Privy Council from 1712 to 1716 and a commissioner Keeper of the Privy Seal in 1715. He was a Member of Parliament (MP) for Carlisle from 1713 to 1715 and for Cumberland from 1722 to 1727.

He married Julia, the daughter of Sir John Chardin of Kempton Park, Middlesex. They had 7 sons and 4 daughters. He was succeeded as baronet by his eldest son Philip.

Parliament of Great Britain
Preceded by Thomas Stanwix; Sir James Montagu	Member of Parliament for Carlisle; 1713–1715; With: Thomas Stanwix	Succeeded by Thomas Stanwix; William Strickland
Preceded by Gilfrid Lawson; James Lowther	Member of Parliament for Cumberland; 1722–1727; With: Gilfrid Lawson	Succeeded by Gilfrid Lawson; James Lowther
Baronetage of England
Preceded by Christopher Musgrave	Baronet (of Hartley Castle); 1704–1736	Succeeded by Philip Musgrave
