= Chirton Hall =

Country house in Tyne and Wear, England

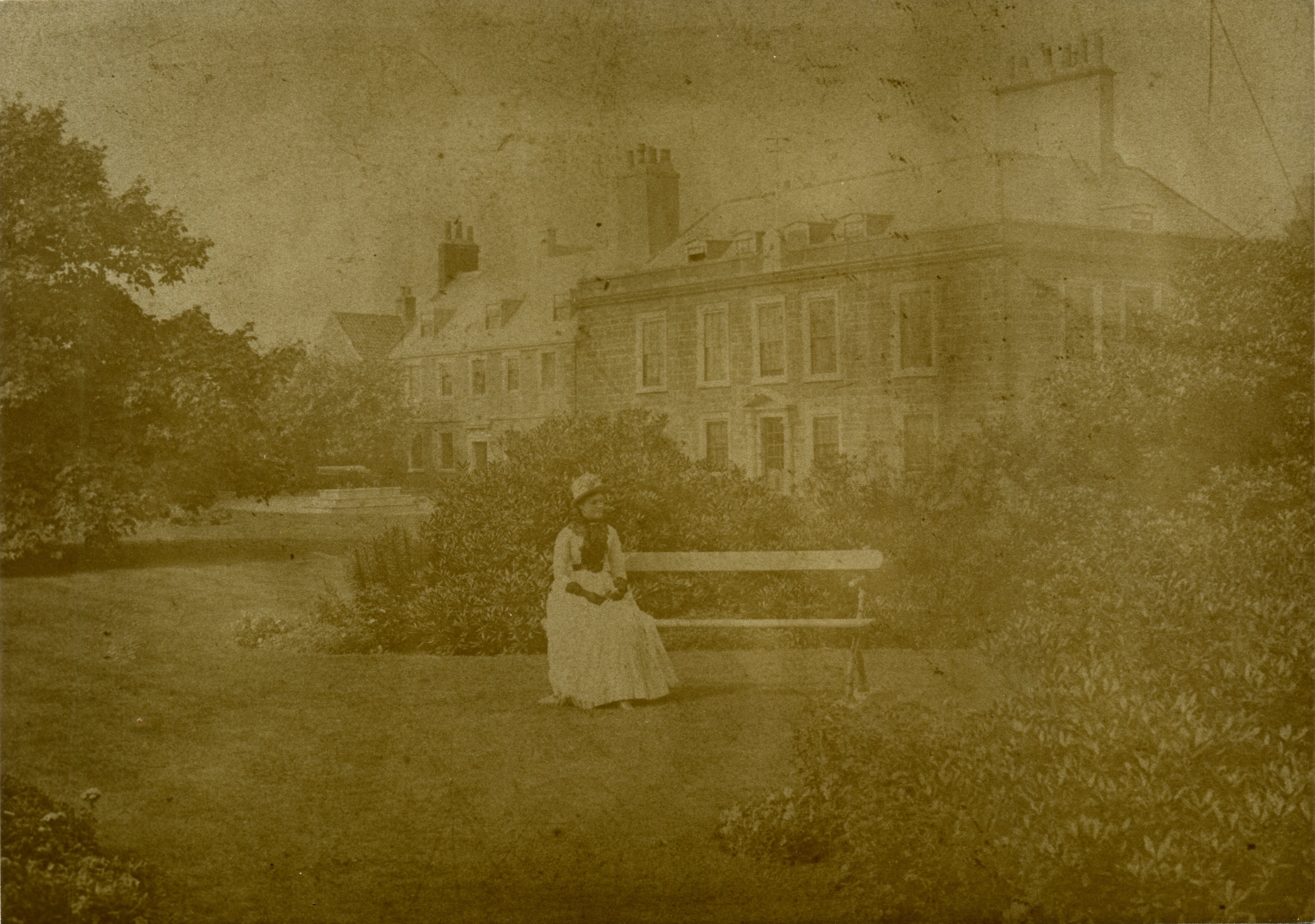

Chirton Hall or Chirton House, occasionally spelled Churton and originally Cheuton, was a country house in Chirton, in what is now a western suburb of North Shields, Tyne and Wear, North East England. Historically, the house was in the county of Northumberland.

== History ==
In 1672, Ralph Reed sold his land in Chirton to John Clarke, an agent of Josceline Percy, 11th Earl of Northumberland. The Countess of Northumberland gave Clarke the materials to build the hall from the demolished Warkworth Castle. The labour to build the large, plain, brick house came from the Percy estate. The text of Clarke's documented letter from 1672 is shown to the right.

"William Milbourne, -Being to take downe the materialls of Warkworth Castle, which are given to me by the Countess of Northumberland to build a house at Cheuton, I doe desire you to speake to all hir ladishipps tenants in Warkworth, Birlinge, Buston, Acklington, Shilbottle, Lesbury. Longhaughto, and Bilton, that, they will assist me with their draughts as soone as conveniently they can, to remove the lead and tymber which shall be taken downe, and such materialls as shall be fitt to be removed, and bringe it to Cheuton, which will be an obligation to theire and your friend, JO. CLARKE."

—

Clarke spared many of the castle walls because he found it would be more expensive to pull them down than to purchase new stones from the quarry. After he died in 1675, Clarke's widow, Jane, married Philip Bickerstaffe (MP for Berwick in 1685) the same year and Chirton Hall became his seat. Jane died in 1694.

On 1 August 1699 Bickerstaffe surrendered his copyhold lands in Chirton to Sir William Blackett who sold the hall to Archibald Campbell, 1st Duke of Argyll.

Robert Lawson, the High Sheriff of Northumberland in 1707, resided at Chirton Hall and by that time, there were adjoining plantations. It was owned by the Milburns in the early 18th century and, through marriage, it was passed to the Roddams, and then the Collingwoods. In 1767, the owner was James Hylton de Cardonnel Lawson. It became a property of Edward Collingwood (1734 – 1806), a commissioner of Greenwich hospital, and a barrister who ordered the construction of Dissington Hall. then of his cousin, Lord Cuthbert Collingwood, 1st Baron Collingwood (1748–1810), a notable naval commander. After Cuthbert Collingwood's death in 1810, the house passed to his brother, John Collingwood.

In 1828, a West Chirton Hall belonged to Michael Robson (1783–1837), a coal baron. The last reported owner was his daughter, Annie Robson, who married on 23 August 1843. In 1870, portions of the Chirton estate were sold off in numerous lots.

Chirton Hall had fallen into ruins by the mid-19th century and no longer exists. In 1968, it was reported that little more than the piers of the gateway remained.

== Haunting ==
In the 19th century, it was reputed to be haunted by the former mistress of the Duke of Argyll who lived there. The sound of her silk dress was reported to have been heard, her ghost being known as "Silky". The road on which the building was located subsequently became known as Silkey's Lane.
