= Sir Henry Fletcher, 3rd Baronet, of Hutton le Forest =

English baronet and politician

Sir Henry Fletcher, 3rd Baronet (April 1661 – 19 May 1712) was an English baronet and politician.

He was the oldest son of Sir George Fletcher, 2nd Baronet and his first wife Alice Hare, daughter of Hugh Hare, 1st Baron Coleraine. In 1700, he succeeded his father as baronet. Fletcher was educated at The Queen's College, Oxford, where he matriculated on 10 June 1678. He entered the English House of Commons as member of parliament (MP) for Cockermouth in 1689, representing the constituency until the following year.

Fletcher converted to Roman Catholicism and lived then as a monk in the English monastery of Douai in France. He died there, unmarried and childless, and was buried in a chapel, he had built for the community at his own expense. With his death the baronetcy became extinct.

Parliament of England
Preceded by Sir Daniel Fleming; Sir Orlando Gee	Member of Parliament for Cockermouth; 1689 – 1690; With: Sir Henry Capell	Succeeded by Sir Wilfrid Lawson; Sir Orlando Gee
Baronetage of England
Preceded by George Fletcher	Baronet (of Hutton le Forest); 1700 – 1712	Extinct
