= Robert Scawen =

English politician (1602–1670)

Robert Scawen (c. May 1602 – 1670) was an English politician who sat in the House of Commons at various times between 1640 and 1670. He supported the Parliamentary cause in the English Civil War.

Scawen was the second son of Robert Scawen of Molinick, St. Germans, Cornwall and his wife Isabel Nicholl, daughter of Humphrey Nicoll of Penvose, St Tudy, Cornwall. He was baptised on 16 May 1602.

He became an attorney in London and was receiver-general for Hampshire, Wiltshire, and Gloucestershire from 1638 to 1649 on a life patent in succession to John Pym. He became secretary to the Earl of Northumberland in 1639 and learned the basics of military administration during the Bishops' Wars.

In November 1640, Scawen was elected Member of Parliament for Berwick upon Tweed for the Long Parliament and survived Pride's Purge to retain his seat after 1648. Unlike his brother William Scawen he supported to the Parliamentary cause in the Civil War in adherence to the Earl of Northumberland. He was commissioner for new model ordnance in Middlesex in 1645 and chairman of the army committee from 1645 to 1648. In 1647, he was commissioner for sewers for Lincolnshire and Northamptonshire, was commissioner for assessment for Westminster in 1648 and commissioner for assessment for Middlesex in 1648 and 1649. In 1648 he was also commissioner for militia for Northumberland. He was a J.P. for Middlesex from 1649 to 1652. In 1658 he bought the manor of Horton, Buckinghamshire.

In 1659, Scawen was elected MP for Grampound in the Third Protectorate Parliament. He was commissioner for management of revenue from 1659 to May 1660. In March 1660 he was commissioner for militia for Buckinghamshire and in May 1660 he resumed his post as Receiver-general for Hampshire, Wiltshire, and Gloucestershire. He was commissioner for disbandment from September 1660 to 1661, and commissioner for excise appeals from October 1660 until his death.

On 3 March 1662, Scawen was elected MP for Cockermouth in the Cavalier Parliament and in 1663 became a member of the Society of Mineral and Battery Works. He was commissioner for assessment for Cornwall, Cumberland and Buckinghamshire from 1663 to 1669. In 1664 he became joint receiver of the hearth tax for Cornwall until 1666. In 1665 he became commissioner for revenue wagons until 1667 and commissioner for assessment for Middlesex until 1669.

Scawen married Catherine Alsopp, daughter of Cavendish Alsopp, merchant, of London and had seven sons and two daughters. Two of his sons, William and Thomas, were both to be MPs and Governors of the Bank of England.

Parliament of England
Preceded by Sir Thomas Widdrington; Hugh Potter	Member of Parliament for Berwick upon Tweed; 1640–1653; With: Sir Thomas Widdrington	Succeeded by Not represented in Barebones Parliament
Preceded by Not represented in Second Protectorate Parliament	Member of Parliament for Grampound; 1659; With: Thomas Herle	Succeeded by Sir John Trevor
Preceded by Sir Wilfrid Lawson; Hugh Potter	Member of Parliament for Cockermouth; 1663–1670; With: Sir Wilfrid Lawson	Succeeded by Sir Wilfrid Lawson; John Clarke
