= John Clarke (died 1675) =

John Clarke, DL, JP (died 6 May 1675) was an English landowner and politician who sat in the House of Commons from 1670 to 1675.

Clarke was the son of Roger Clarke of Great Torrington, Devon and his wife Honor Hockin, daughter of Christopher Hockin, clothier, of Frithelstock, Devon. He became an agent of Josceline Percy, 11th Earl of Northumberland. He was J.P. for Northumberland from July 1660 until his death, and commissioner for assessment for Northumberland from 1661 to 1663. He was commissioner for assessment for Northumberland and Newcastle upon Tyne from 1664 to 1674. In 1662 he became a freeman of Newcastle.

In 1670 Clarke was elected Member of Parliament for Cockermouth in the Cavalier Parliament. He was Deputy Lieutenant from 1670 until his death. In 1675 he was commissioner for recusants for Cumberland.

He purchased land in Chirton, Northumberland, in what is now North Shields, Tyne and Wear, from Ralph Reed in 1672. There he built Chirton Hall with materials initially from the demolished Warkworth Castle.

Clarke died in 1675 after ten days sickness, "mostly of a lethargy".

Clarke married Jane, but had no issue. In 1685, his widow married Philip Bickerstaffe, MP for Berwick-upon-Tweed and later for Northumberland.

Parliament of England
Preceded by Sir Wilfrid Lawson; Robert Scawen	Member of Parliament for Cockermouth; 1670–1675; With: Sir Wilfrid Lawson	Succeeded by Sir Richard Grahme; Sir Wilfrid Lawson
