= Richard Dowdeswell (died 1711) =

English Whig politician

Richard Dowdeswell (c. 1653 – 17 October 1711), of Pull Court, Bushley, Worcestershire, was an English Whig politician who sat in the English and British House of Commons from 1685 to 1710.

Dowdeswell was the eldest son of William Dowdeswell of Pull Court, Worcestershire and his wife Judith Wymonsold, daughter of Elkin Wymonsold of Putney, Surrey. He matriculated at Christ Church, Oxford on 27 July 1669, aged 16. He married Elizabeth Winnington, daughter of Sir Francis Winnington of the Middle Temple and Stanford Court, Stanford-on-Teme, Worcestershire in 1676. He succeeded his father in 1683.

Dowdeswell was Commissioner for assessment for Worcestershire from 1677 to 1680, Justice of the Peace for Gloucestershire and Worcestershire from 1677 to 1681 and a Freeman of Preston in 1682. At the 1685 English general election he was returned unopposed as Member of Parliament (MP) for Tewkesbury but made little impression in Parliament. He was Sheriff of Worcestershire for the year 1688 to 1689. Following the Glorious Revolution, he became Commissioner for Assessment for Gloucestershire and Worcestershire from 1689 to 1690, Justice of the Peace for Gloucestershire and Worcestershire from 1689 for the rest of his life, and Deputy Lieutenant for Gloucestershire from 1689. He was returned unopposed as MP for Tewkesbury at the 1689 English general election. He was on the committee of elections and privileges, and a committee preparing the bill to abolish the hearth tax.

Dowdeswell was returned unopposed for Tewkesbury as a Whig at the 1690 English general election and helped prepare the bill relating to the rights of borough corporations. In this respect, with his father-in-law, Sir Francis Winnington, be initiated a petition, by May 1693, for a new charter for Tewkesbury. At the 1695 English general election he was returned again and continued to support the administration. He signed the Association and voted, in March, to fix the price of guineas at 22 shillings. He voted for the attainder of Sir John Fenwick on 25 November 1696, and acted as a teller on several occasions. By 1698, he was a Captain of Foot Militia for Worcestershire. He was returned again as MP for Tewkesbury at the 1698 English general election and at the two general elections of 1701. By 1702 he was deputy lieutenant for Worcestershire and was returned again for Tewkesbury at the 1702 English general election. He was returned again for Tewkesbury at the 1705 English general election. He was returned again as a Whig at the 1708 British general election and voted for the naturalization of the Palatines in 1709, but did not vote on the impeachment of Dr Sacheverell. He was defeated at the 1710 British general election when he was suffering ill-health.

Dowdeswell died in October 1711 leaving three sons, two having predeceased him, and three daughters.

Parliament of England
Preceded by (Sir) Henry Capell; Sir Francis Russell	Member of Parliament for Tewkesbury; 1685–1707; With: Sir Francis Russell 1685-1690 (Sir) Henry Capell 1690-1692; Sir Francis Winnington 1692-1698; Charles Hancock 1698-1701; Edmund Bray 1701-1707	Succeeded by Parliament of Great Britain
Parliament of Great Britain
Preceded by Parliament of England	Member of Parliament for Tewkesbury; 1707–1710; With: Edmund Bray 1707-1708; Henry Ireton 1708-1710	Succeeded by William Bromley; Henry Ireton
