= Richard Graham, 1st Viscount Preston =

English diplomat and politician (1648–1695)

The Right Honourable The Viscount Preston PC
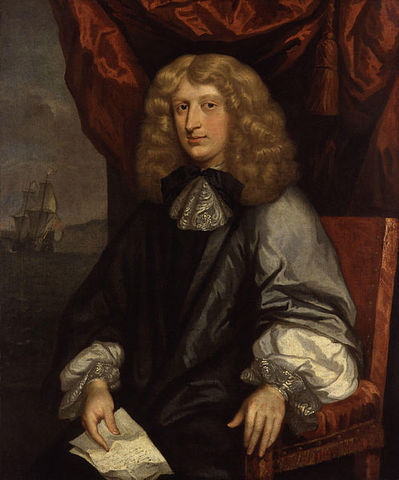

Lord President of the Council
- In office 1688–1689
- Preceded by: The Earl of Sunderland
- Succeeded by: The Earl of Danby

Secretary of State for the Northern Department
- In office 1688–1689
- Preceded by: The Earl of Middleton
- Succeeded by: The Earl of Nottingham

Personal details
- Born: 24 September 1648 Netherby, Cumberland
- Died: 22 December 1695 (aged 47)
- Education: Christ Church, Oxford

Richard Graham, 1st Viscount Preston PC (24 September 1648 – 22 December 1695) was an English diplomat and politician who sat in the House of Commons in two periods between 1675 and 1689. He became a Jacobite conspirator, but his reputation in the Jacobite community suffered when he gave evidence against his co-conspirators in exchange for a pardon.

== Origins and education ==
Graham was born at Netherby, Cumberland, on 24 September 1648, the eldest son of Sir George Graham, 2nd Baronet (d. 1658), of Netherby, son and heir of Sir Richard Graham, 1st Baronet (d. 1654). His mother was Lady Mary Johnstone, second daughter of James Johnstone, 1st Earl of Hartfell. He was educated at Westminster School under Dr Busby, although not on the foundation. He proceeded to Christ Church, Oxford, about 1664. On 4 February 1666 he graduated Master of Arts.

== Rise to prominence ==
Graham was elected member of parliament (MP) for Cockermouth, Cumberland, on 8 June 1675, in the place of John Clarke, deceased, and continued to represent that borough in the parliaments of 1678–9, 1679, and 1680–1. Though a Protestant he zealously advocated the right of James, Duke of York, to the succession. Supported by other high Tories he moved in the Commons on behalf of the Duke against the Exclusion Bill, 2 November 1680. His exertions were rewarded by his being created a peer of Scotland by the title of Viscount Preston in the county of Haddington, and Baron Graham of Eske. The patent, which is dated at Windsor Castle on 12 May 1681, recites that Charles I in 1635 had given the warrant to Sir Richard Graham, the patentee's grandfather, and that it had afterwards been burnt by the rebels. In July 1681 Preston was in attendance on the Duke of York at Edinburgh; on 1 August he took his place in the Parliament of Scotland; and on 26 August was with the duke at Leith, where he made a speech about the succession.

== Diplomatic career ==
In May 1682 he succeeded Henry Savile as envoy extraordinary to the court of France. His instructions included many relating to Orange and Luxembourg, and to the proposal to Charles II to be the mediator of a peace between France and Spain, and relating to French excesses in the Netherlands. In August he gave notice that a plot for a descent upon Ireland was being concocted in France against Charles, and he employed spies to collect information on the subject. The king was not much disturbed, and ordered one of Preston's spies out of his presence as a liar. In September Preston presented a strongly worded memorial to the French king 'touching his seizing upon the city of Orange, looking on it as done to himself'. In October 1683 the Earl of Sunderland by the king's commands gave Preston directions to let the ministers in France know 'what a very ill man Dr. Burnet was.' Preston obeyed these orders, but declined to receive a visit from Burnet. He was ordered to endeavour to trace out Bomeny, the valet to the Arthur Capell, 1st Earl of Essex, who was suspected of being privy to that nobleman's death in the Tower of London. For his attention to the privileges in France of the Scottish people, he gained the thanks of the Scottish royal boroughs. At the beginning of 1684, he heard reports that he was to be recalled, but the king disavowed any such intention in a very cordial letter.

== Political career under James II ==
Preston returned home at the accession of James II, settling in Soho Square, and on 2 April 1685 was elected M.P. for Cumberland. He hoped to have been raised to the English peerage as Baron Liddell in Cumberland, but was disappointed on account of his adherence to his religion. In conjunction with Lord Middleton he was entrusted by James with the management of the House of Commons which met on 19 May, was sworn a member of the privy council on 21 October, and five days later became chancellor to the queen-dowager. In 1687 he was made Lord Lieutenant of Cumberland and Westmorland. At the end of October 1688 he was made northern Secretary and chosen Lord President of the Council in succession to the Earl of Sunderland, and was one of the council of five appointed by the king to represent him in London during his absence at Salisbury in November 1688. He vainly endeavoured to impress upon James the necessity of moderation.

== Jacobite conspirator ==
After the revolution Preston, who was in high favour with Louis XIV, was entrusted by the French government with considerable sums of money for political purposes. In a gesture, which was also intended to be a test case, James II, created him, by letters patent dated at St. Germain-en-Laye 21 January 1689 Baron of Esk, in the Peerage of England (but in reality in the Jacobite peerage), which title was not recognised subsequently by the House of Lords. In March 1689 he was reported to be in the north of England concerting measures for the restoration of the king. In May he was arrested, brought up to London, committed to the Tower, and not admitted to bail until 25 October. Meanwhile, the Earl of Montagu had commenced an action against him to recover the profits of the office of wardrobe, for which he held a life patent for the place. Preston thereupon appeared before the House of Lords on 11 November, claiming the privilege of a peer of the realm in respect of the action at law. He stated that he had received a patent to be an English Peer from James II before the vote of abdication passed. The house thereupon sent him to the Tower, and instructed the attorney-general to prosecute him for a high misdemeanour. He was, however, released on making a humble apology and withdrawing his claim, on 27 November. On the following day, he obtained a discharge from his recognisances in the court of king's bench, no further notice being taken of his conduct in the north. On 28 June 1690 Lord Montagu won his action, being awarded £1,300 damages. Preston carried on his plots, and was still regarded by his party as a man of courage and honour. He retained the seals of his office, and was still considered by the Jacobites as the real secretary of state. The lord president, Carmarthen, caused a watch to be set on his movements. In December 1690 a meeting of the leading Protestant Jacobites was held, at which it was determined that Preston should carry to St. Germain the resolutions of the conspirators.

== Arrest, trial and pardon ==
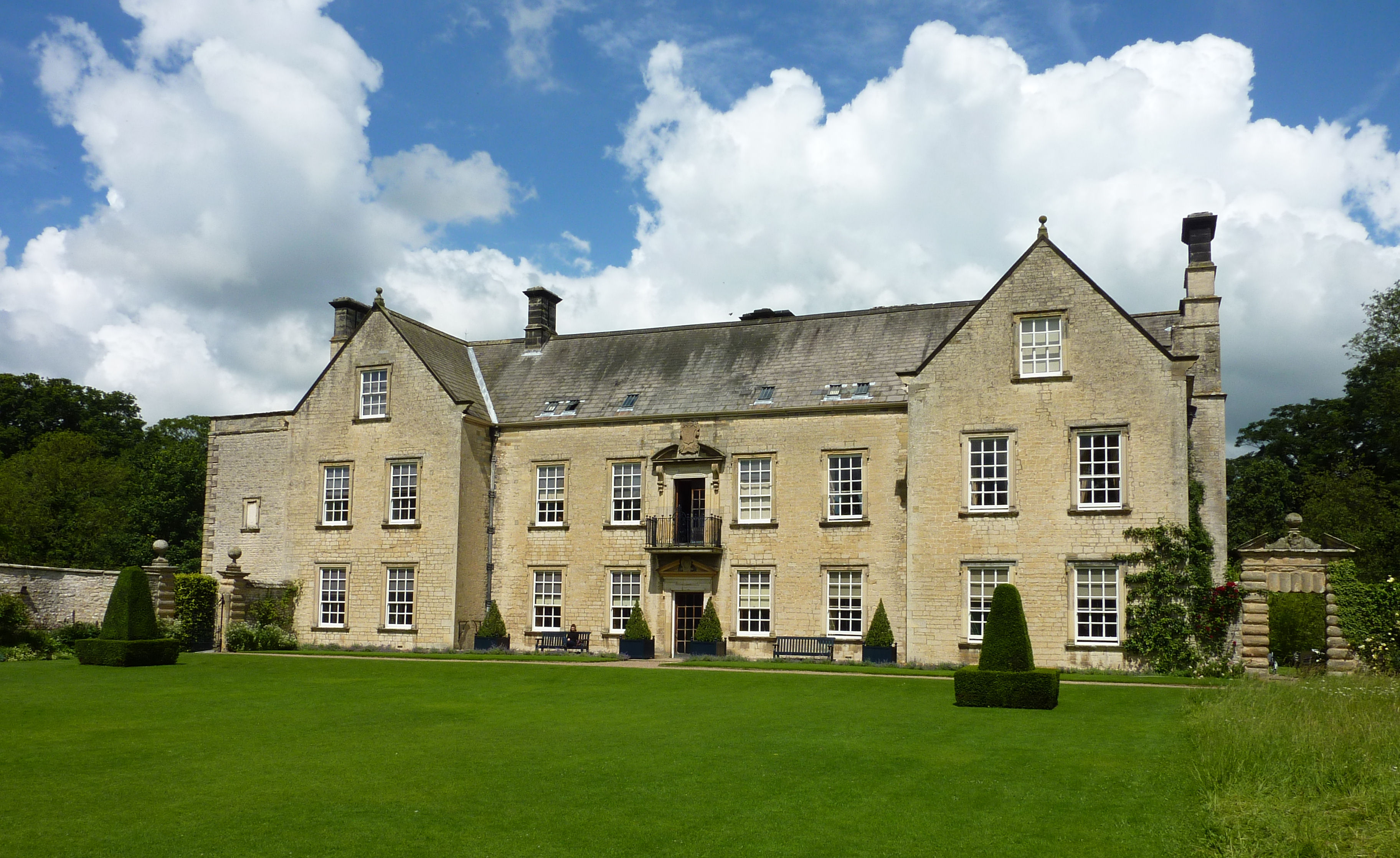
Nunnington Hall, Yorkshire

Soon after midnight on 1 January 1691 Preston, Major Edmund Elliott, and John Ashton were seized as they lay concealed in the hatches of a smack making for Calais or Dunkirk. A packet of treasonable papers, tied together and weighted in order to be sunk in case of surprise, was dropped by Preston with his official seals, and seized upon the person of Ashton, who had tried to conceal it. The prisoners vainly attempted to bribe their captors. On 3 January Preston was sent to the Tower, and on the 16th was indicted at the Old Bailey in the name of Sir Richard Graham for high treason. He pleaded that as a peer of England he was not within the jurisdiction of the court, but this plea being overruled, he was on 17 January found guilty, and condemned to death two days afterwards. His estate and title of baronet were forfeited to the crown. Some months passed before his fate was decided. Lady Preston, on petitioning the queen for her husband's life, received an intimation that he could save himself by making a full discovery of the plot. During some time he regularly wrote, it is said, a confession every forenoon, and burned it every night when he had dined. At last he confessed his guilt, and named Clarendon, Dartmouth, Francis Turner, Bishop of Ely, and William Penn as his accomplices. He added a long list of persons against whom he could not himself give evidence, but who, if he could trust to Penn's assurances, were friendly to King James. After several respites, the government, convinced that he could tell even more, again fixed a day for his execution. At length, on 1 May, he made a further confession, and gained thereby another reprieve of three weeks, 'which, 'tis believed,' writes Luttrell, 'will end in a pardon'. A patent was passed for his pardon soon afterwards, and on 13 June he obtained his release. His estate was, however, still retained by the crown as security for his good behaviour, a supposed equivalent being granted him from the exchequer. Subsequently, in September 1693, Queen Mary II granted £600 a year from the forfeited estate to Lady Preston and her children. The attainder could not affect his Scottish peerage, as no act of forfeiture against him passed in Scotland. Early in August 1691, Preston was recommitted to Newgate Prison for refusing to give evidence against some 'criminals,' but was soon bailed out. Thereafter he was permitted to retire to Nunnington Hall in Yorkshire, which he had inherited from his great-uncle, pursued by the execrations of his party.

== Translator of Boethius ==
Preston employed the remainder of his life in revising for the press a translation with notes of Boethius's De Consolatione Philosophiae which he had made in 1680. It was published after his death in London in 1695–1696, and is remarkable on account of the allusions with which the preface is filled. In figurative language, the translator complained that his judges had been more lenient than the friends who had sneered at him for giving way under trials which they had never undergone.

== Death and posterity ==
Preston died at Nunnington Hall on 22 December 1695, and was buried in the chancel of the church. He married, on 2 August 1670, Lady Anne Howard, second daughter of Charles Howard, 1st Earl of Carlisle, by whom he had with other issue a son, Edward (1679–1709), who succeeded him as second Viscount Preston. He also had two daughters, Catherine (1677–1757), who married William Widdrington, 4th Baron Widdrington, and Mary (died unmarried in 1753). They inherited the Nunnington estate in 1739 on the death of their nephew Charles (1706–1739), the third Viscount Preston, who had died without offspring.

Parliament of England
Preceded by Sir Wilfrid Lawson; John Clarke	Member of Parliament for Cockermouth; 1675–1681; With: Sir Wilfrid Lawson 1675–1679; Sir Orlando Gee 1679–1681	Succeeded by Sir Orlando Gee; Sir Daniel Fleming
Preceded by Sir John Lowther; Sir George Fletcher	Member of Parliament for Cumberland; 1685–1689; With: Sir John Lowther	Succeeded by Sir John Lowther; Sir George Fletcher
Diplomatic posts
Preceded by Henry Savile	English Ambassador to France; 1682–1685; With: The Earl of Feversham (1682); The Earl of Dumbarton (1683); The Earl of Arran (1683–1684)	Succeeded by The Lord Churchill
Political offices
Preceded by The Earl of Sunderland	Lord President of the Council; 1688–1689	Succeeded by The Earl of Danby
Preceded by The Earl of Middleton	Secretary of State for the Northern Department; 1688–1689	Succeeded by The Earl of Nottingham
Honorary titles
Preceded by The Earl of Thanet	Lord Lieutenant of Cumberland and Westmorland; 1687–1688	Succeeded by Sir John Lowther
Peerage of Scotland
New creation	Viscount Preston; 1681–1695	Succeeded by Edward Graham
Peerage of England
New creation	— TITULAR — Baron of Esk; Jacobite peerage 1689–1695	Succeeded by Edward Graham
Baronetage of England
Preceded by George Graham	Baronet (of Esk); 1658–1695	Succeeded by Edward Graham
