= Sir Wilfrid Lawson, 1st Baronet, of Isell =

English landowner and politician

Sir Wilfrid Lawson, 1st Baronet, of Isel Hall, Cumberland (c. 1610–1688) was an English landowner and politician who sat in the House of Commons from 1660 to 1679.

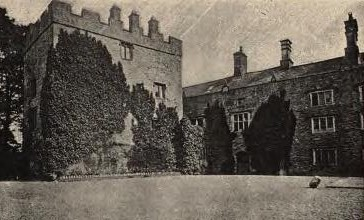
Isel Hall, Cumbria in 1892

== Life ==
Lawson was born in 1610, the son of William Lawson, and his wife Judith Bewley, daughter of William Bewley of Hesket. His great uncle was Sir Wilfred Lawson who acquired the family estate of Isel in Elizabethan times and served as MP for Cumberland. Lawson matriculated at Queen's College, Oxford on 21 November 1628, aged 17. He was knighted by Charles I on 28 February 1641.

Although knighted by Charles I in 1641, and appointed to the position of ship money sheriff and a nominee to the commission of array, Lawson became active on parliaments behalf at the start of the English Civil War. He set up a garrison on St Herbert's Island, Derwent Water, then part of his estate, and became commander-in-chief for Cumberland in 1644. He held local office throughout the Interregnum, and sat for the county in Richard Cromwell’s Parliament. But his loyalty to the Rump was suspect, and he was imprisoned.

In 1643, he attempted to seize Carlisle Castle for the Parliament; however, the local gentry and the militia routed the parliamentarians and pursued them to Abbey Holme, only to release them on the understanding that they would discontinue their belligerence.

In 1652, he assisted a group of Cromwell’s supporter’s when they laid waste to Rydal Hall. His acts of aggression also included the persecution of the Quaker community. He became High Sheriff of Cumberland in 1635, 1645–1647, and 1652–1657 and succeeded his father c.1654, inheriting Isel Hall.

In 1659, Lawson was elected Member of Parliament (MP) for Cumberland in the Third Protectorate Parliament. He was re-elected MP for Cumberland in 1660 for the Convention Parliament. An inactive Member of the Convention, he was appointed to 11 committees, including the committee of elections and privileges and those for the land purchases and indemnity bills. After the Restoration he was named to the committees to inquire into impropriate rectories and unauthorized Anglican publications.

On 7 July, Christopher Clapham introduced a proviso to the indemnity bill requiring Lawson to make reparations to Sir Jordan Crosland and his wife for the plunder of Rydal Hall. Lawson, in his only recorded speech, 'made his defence, saying he never saw any plate or moneys', which plea the House accepted.

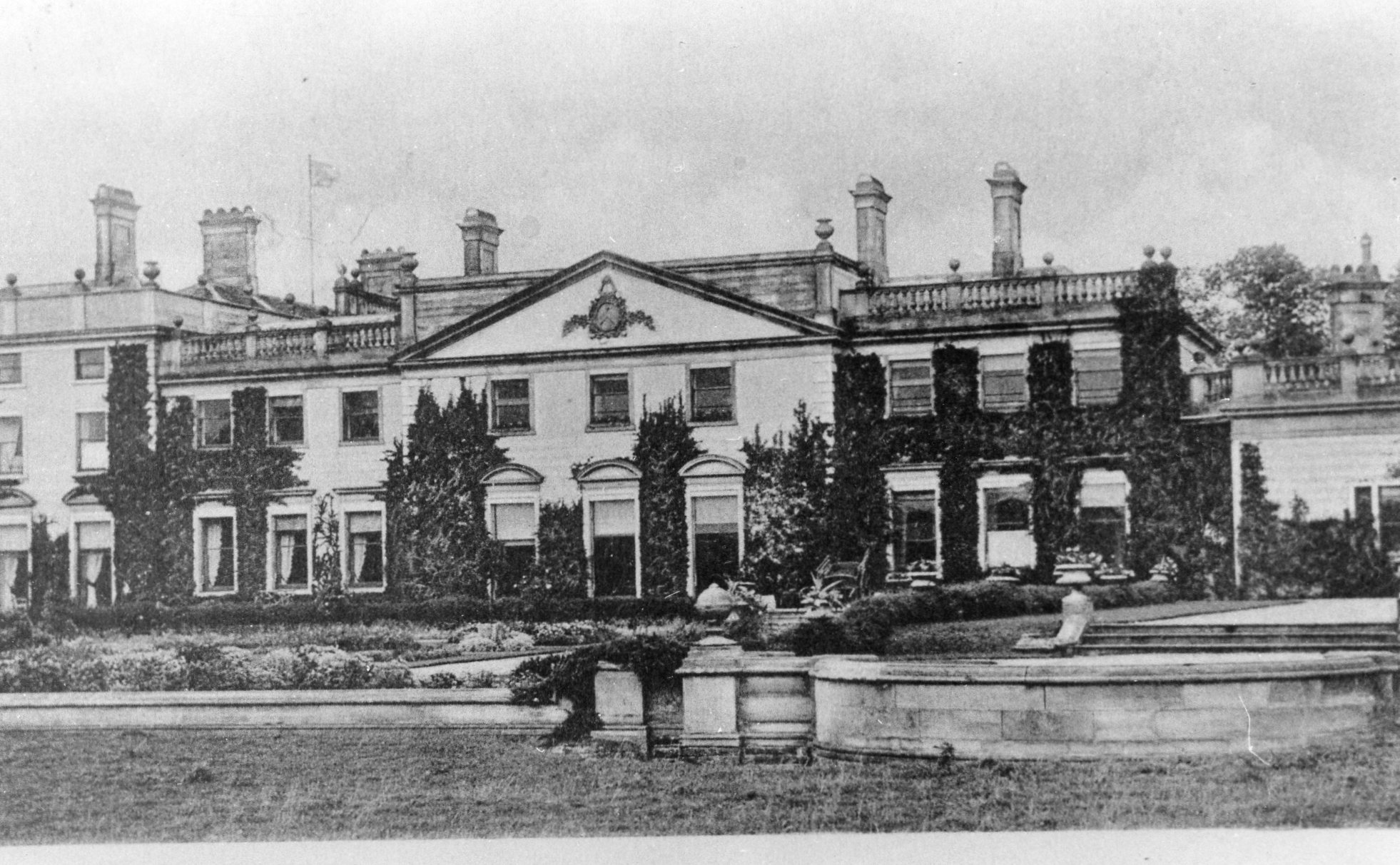
Brayton Hall, Cumbria in 1900

At the general election of 1661, Lawson transferred to a borough seat at Cockermouth, where he enjoyed a strong burgage interest until 1679. However, he proved to be one of the least active Members of the Cavalier Parliament, and apparently veered towards the Court. He left no trace in the Journals till the 1666 session when he was added to the elections committee, and appointed to those to inquire into the charter of the Canary Company and to consider a bill for the relief of poor prisoners.

In 1688, shortly before his death, he purchased a baronetcy patent from James II, at a cost of around £2,000. and purchased Brayton from the Salkeld family.

== Family ==
Lawson died in 1688. He had married Jane Musgrave, sister of Sir Edward Musgrave, 1st Baronet of [Nova Scotia] and had five sons and eight daughters, twelve of whom survived to be married. The following is the epitaph in the chancel of Isel church:

Here lies Sir Wilfrid Lawson, baronet, and his Lady Jane
He departed this life 13th day of December 1688 aged 79
And she the 8th June 1677 aged 65. Having married four
sons and eight daughters. Vivit post funers virtue.

His eldest son, William, married Milcah Strickland daughter of Sir William Strickland, 1st Baronet of Boynton, Yorkshire and had a son Wilfrid and two daughters. But William having previously lost his eyesight died within the lifetime of his father.

Lawson settled the family estate at Isel on his grandson Wilfrid (son of his first son William), who subsequently became Sir Wilfrid Lawson, 2nd Baronet; and to Wilfrid, MP for Cockermouth, his second son, he bequeathed the manors of Brayton, Bassenthwaite, Hensingham and Loweswater so founding the line of ‘Brayton’ Lawson's upon whom the baronetcy descended on the failure of the Isel Lawsons. Wilfrid also predeceased his father, Brayton passing to his son Gilfrid.

== Lawson lineage ==
The Lawsons are descended from John Lawson, who was Lord of Fawkegrave in Yorkshire in 1216, the first year of Henry III. Through a long line of eminent ancestors we arrive at Sir Wilfrid Lawson (1545–1632), son of Thomas Lawson of Ushworth (died 1559). Following the death of Thomas Salkeld of Whitehall, Mealsgate his estates including the building and land known as Brayton, passed to Salkeld's three surviving daughters. On 4 September 1658, Thomas Wyberg Esq., of St Bees, Joseph Patrickson of Howe, and William Barwis of Paddigil signed a deed on behalf of their wives the three co-heiresses, transferring the Brayton Manorial Estates and other property valued at one thousand pounds to Sir Wilfrid Lawson of Isel, the 1st Baronet's great-uncle.

== Bibliography ==
- R. S. Ferguson (1871). Cumberland & Westmorland M.P.'s From The Restoration To The Reform Bill Of 1867 (1660-1867). Carlisle.
- John Denton (1887). Estates & Families In The County Of Cumberland From The Conquest Unto The Beginning Of The Reign Of K. James (The First). Kendal.
- R. S. Ferguson (1890). A History Of Cumberland. Carlisle.
- F. J. Field (1937). An Armorial For Cumberland. Kendal.
- Donald Lysons; Samuel Lysons (1816). Lysons History Of Cumberland (A Concise Account Of The County Of Cumberand In 1816. London.
- William Hutchinson (1797). The History Of Cumberland Vol. 2. London.
- John Burke; John Bernard Burke (1844). A Genealogical & Heraldic History Of The Extinct and Dormant Baronetcies. London.
- Joseph Nicolson, Richard Burn (1777). The History and Antiquities of the Counties of Westmorland and Cumberland, (2 Volumes).

Parliament of England
| Preceded by William Briscoe; Charles Howard | Member of Parliament for Cumberland; 1659–1661; With: William Briscoe 1659; Charles Howard 1660–1661 | Succeeded by Sir Patricius Curwen; Sir George Fletcher |
| Preceded by Not represented | Member of Parliament for Cockermouth; 1660–1679; With: Richard Tolson 1660–1661; Hugh Potter 1661–1662; Robert Scawen 1662–1670; John Clarke 1670–1675; Sir Richard Graham 1675–1679 | Succeeded by Sir Richard Graham; Sir Orlando Gee |
Baronetage of England
| New creation | Baronet (of Isell); 1688 | Succeeded by Wilfrid Lawson |
