= Philip Bickerstaffe =

Philip Bickerstaffe (1639–1714) was an English Tory politician, merchant and the owner of Amble Works. He was M.P. for Berwick-upon-Tweed 1685; and for Northumberland 1689–1698. He descended from the family of Bickerstaffes, of Bickerstaffe, Lancashire. Although he opposed the transfer of the Crown to the Prince of Orange in 1668–69, he was re-elected for the next parliament of 1669–90.

He was known to be "a courtier of the Widdrington group but an unimpeachable Anglican" and a Clerk of His Majesty's Woodyard from about January 1669.

Bickerstaffe was a free burgess of Newcastle, a member of one of the twelve mysteries of the same town, and was admitted to his personal freedom of the fellowship of Hostmen on 11 September 1684.

On 15 November 1692, Bickerstaffe was said to have "claimed that the actions of three men in suing Sir Francis Bland in the court of Exchequer constituted a breach of privilege".

His parents were Howard Bickerstaffe of Chelsham and Elizabeth, while his brother was Sir Charles Bickerstaffe, Kt, Cup-bearer to Charles II. He married Jane (d. 1694), the widow of John Clarke II, M.P. of Cockermouth. Through marriage, Bickerstaffe's seat became the newly built Chirton Hall in the 1670s. Unable to meet various bonds, he lived in Fleet Prison, as reported in 1713.
