= Bredon School =

Private school in Worcestershire, England

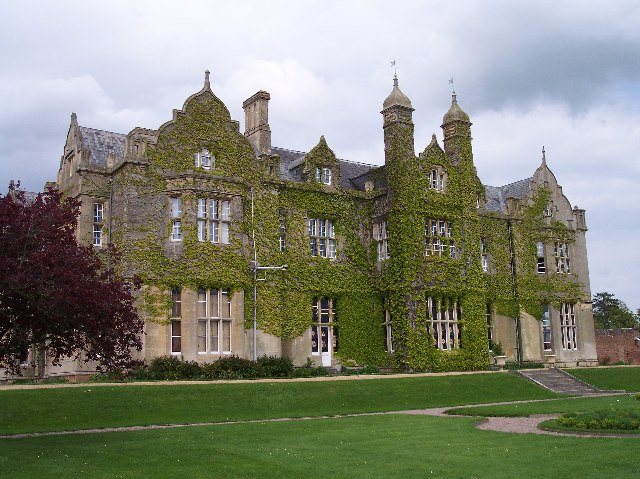
- "large, competent, highly monumental"

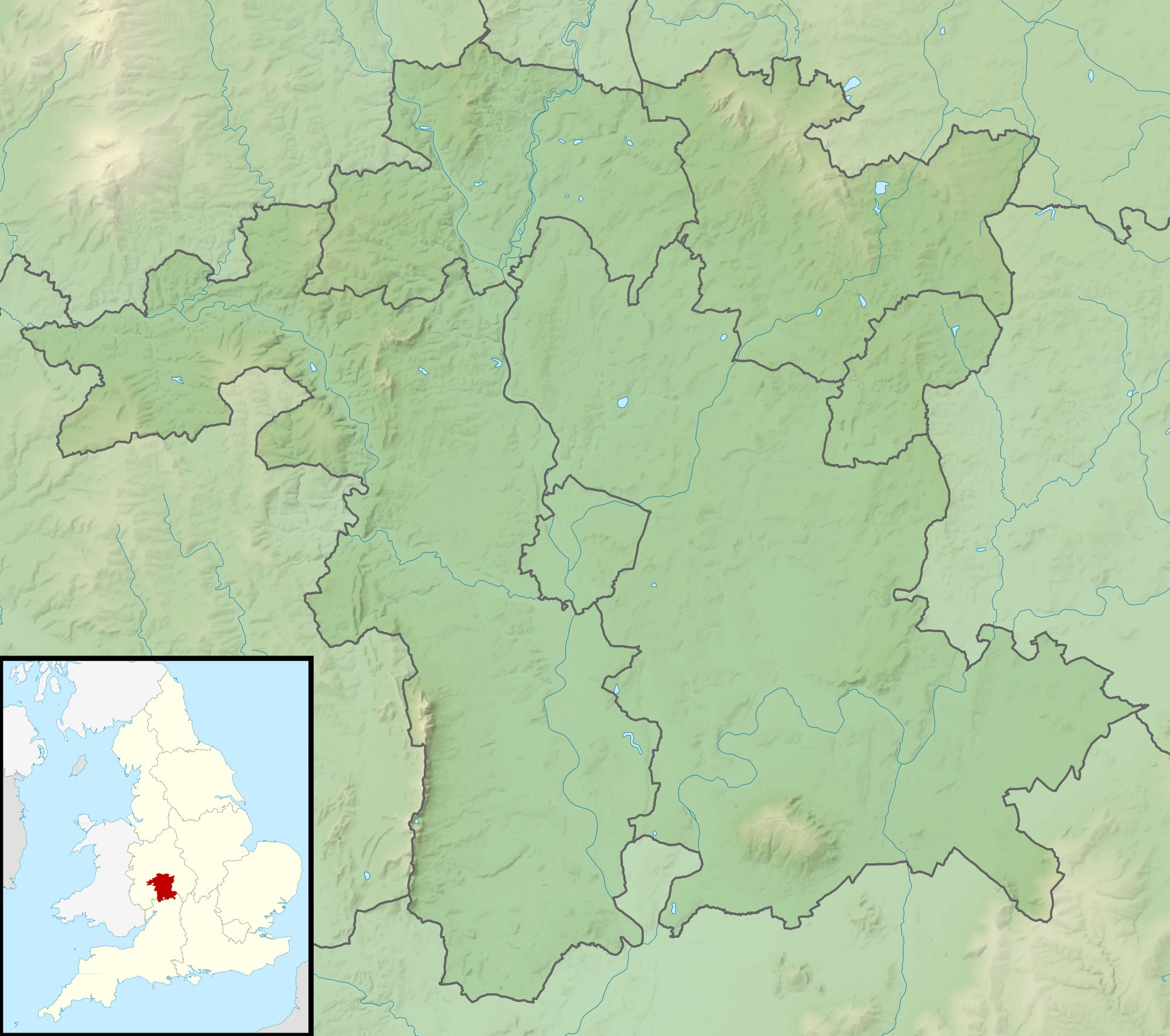
- Location within Worcestershire
- 52.023°N 2.2023°W
- Type: House, now school
- Location: Bushley, Worcestershire

History
- Built: 1834–1839

Site notes
- Architect: Edward Blore
- Architectural style: Tudor Revival
- Owner: Cavendish Education

Listed Building – Grade II*
- Official name: Pull Court, screen, archway and gates
- Designated: 25 March 1968
- Reference no.: 1082217

Listed Building – Grade II
- Official name: Stable Cottage
- Designated: 30 May 1984
- Reference no.: 1178860

Listed Building – Grade II
- Official name: The Stalls
- Designated: 30 May 1984
- Reference no.: 1082218

Listed Building – Grade II
- Official name: 1 & 2 Greenstreet Lodge
- Designated: 30 May 1984
- Reference no.: 1178852

Bredon School, formerly Pull Court, is a private school in Bushley, Worcestershire, England. The house was built for the Reverend Canon E. C. Dowdeswell by Edward Blore between 1831 and 1839. The site is much older and Blore's house replaced an earlier mansion. The Dowdeswells had been prominent in local and national politics since the 18th century, with many serving as members of Parliament. The family sold the house in 1934 to the parents of Richard Seaman, a prominent pre-war racing driver, who lived there until his death in a crash in the 1939 Belgian Grand Prix. In 1962, the court became a school, Bredon School, founded by Lt-Col Tony Sharp and Hugh Jarrett, for the education of boys who had failed the Common Entrance Examination. It remains a specialist school with a focus on educating children with specific learning difficulties, such as dyslexia and dyspraxia.

== History ==
The political fortunes of the Dowdeswell family were established by Richard Dowdeswell (c. 1601-1673). His father, a successful lawyer, had bought Pull Court, and much other property in Worcestershire and neighboring Gloucestershire, in the early 17th century. A prominent Royalist during the English Civil War, Richard Dowdeswell was returned as Member of Parliament for Tewkesbury in the Convention Parliament of 1660. His grandson, another Richard (c. 1653-1711), served as member for the same seat until the early 18th century. A later descendent, William Dowdeswell (1721-1775), served as Chancellor of the Exchequer in 1765 under the Marquess of Rockingham. In the 19th century, the Rev. Canon E. C. Dowdeswell, who had sought preference in the church rather than politics, commissioned Edward Blore to build a new mansion at Pull, near the site of the Dowdeswell ancestral home.

The Court was sold by the Dowdeswell family in the 1930s and was bought by the parents of Richard Seaman, a racing driver. Seaman was killed in the 1939 Belgian Grand Prix. Following the death of Lilian Beattie-Seaman in 1948, Pull Court was used by Wells Court School, a pre-prep school. In 1962, Bredon School was established on the estate.

== Architecture and description ==
Alan Brooks and Nikolaus Pevsner, in their Worcestershire volume of the Buildings of England series, describe Pull Court as "large, competent [and] highly monumental". Mark Girouard, in his study The Victorian Country House, is less impressed, calling Blore's entrance frontage "weedily symmetrical". The main construction material is limestone ashlar, although the north, entrance, front is faced with Lias stone. An archway leads into an enclosed courtyard, with the facing entrance frontage flanked by two wings. The southern, garden frontage is of five bays. A service court lies to the east. The interior decoration is mainly Jacobethan in style.

The court is a Grade II* listed building. The Stable Cottage, another estate building, The Stalls, and a pair of Lodge cottages are all listed Grade II. Tradition ascribes the landscaping of the park around the court to Capability Brown but there is no documentary evidence which supports the claim.

== Bredon School ==
Bredon School is a mixed-entry independent school for children aged 7–18 years, with a specialism in the education of children with the specific learning difficulties of dyslexia and dyscalculia. (Note: The school's postal address is in Gloucestershire, but administratively it is in Worcestershire.)

== Sources ==
- Brooks, Alan; Pevsner, Nikolaus (2007). Worcestershire. The Buildings of England. Yale University Press. ISBN 978-0-300-11298-6.
- Girouard, Mark (1979). The Victorian Country House. New Haven, US and London: Yale University Press. ISBN 978-0-300-02390-9. OCLC 979203757.
