= Brayton Hall =

Coordinates: 54.7707°N 3.2938°W

Brayton Hall is a ruined former mansion in Cumbria, England. Once the ancestral seat of the Lawson family, it stood in a large park, with views of the surrounding countryside and the mountains of the Lake District in the background. Located 1.5 miles east by north of the town of Aspatria, and 7 miles south west by west of the market town of Wigton, it was greatly enlarged and rebuilt in 1868. Brayton Hall was practically destroyed by fire in 1918.

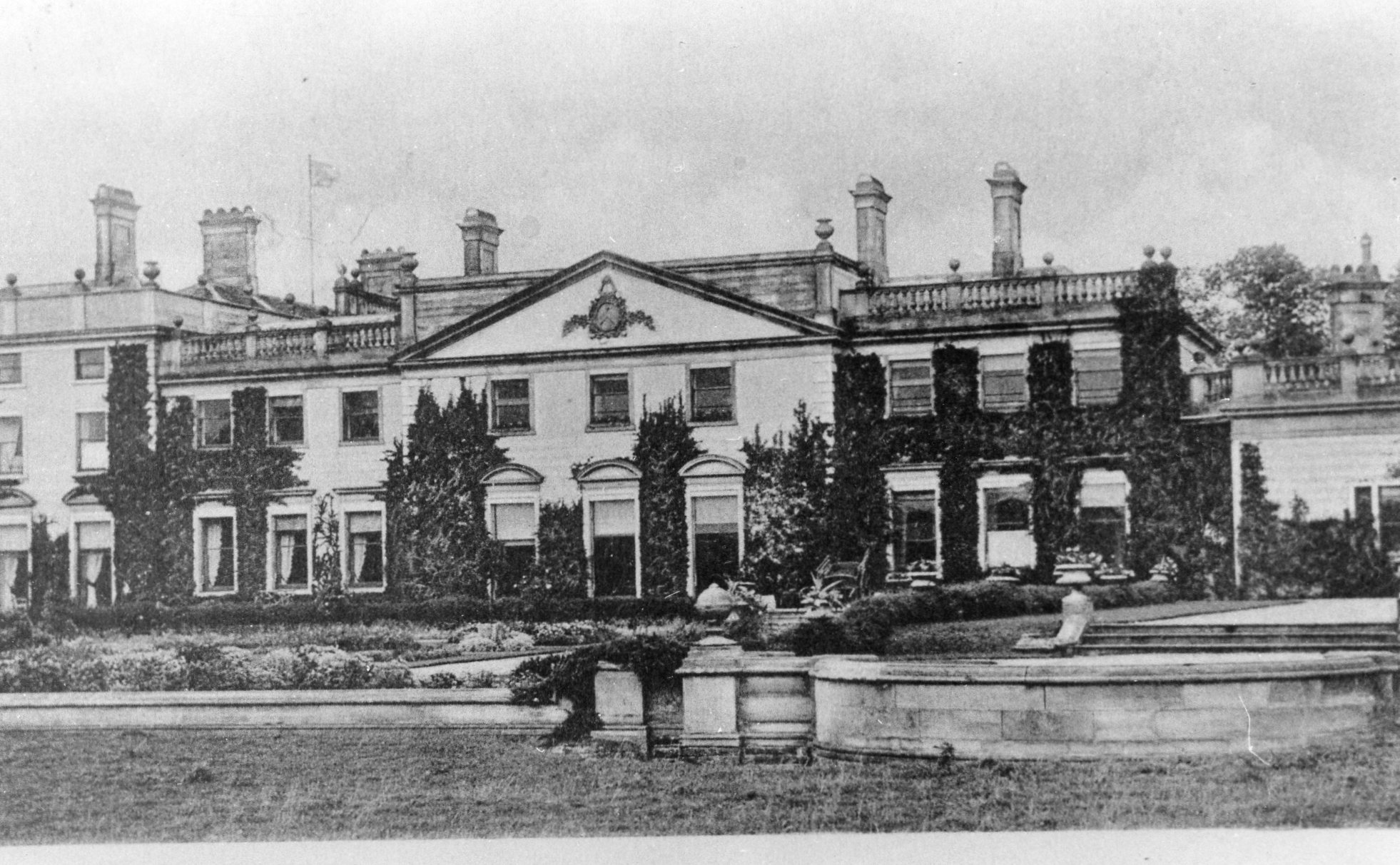
Brayton Hall looking south, circa 1900

== Pre Lawson era ==
Brayton, loosely translated as "Broad Acres", is an ancient manorial estate which formed a joint township with Aspatria. After the Norman Conquest it was granted by Alan, son of Waldieve, to Ughtred, who became the first Lord of the manor in the seignory of Aspatria and barony of Allerdale. An inquisition held in 1578 records a William Bewley owning Brayton by fealty only, sometime the lands of the Bishop of Carlisle in free alms. It was subsequently possessed by a junior member of the Salkeld family, whose three co-heiresses sold it to Sir Wilfrid Lawson, who had previously married the heiress of Isel. At this time the Brayton manorial estate comprised 20 houses, 20 tofts, 20 gardens, 260 acres (110 ha) of land, 100 acres (40 ha) of meadow, 200 acres (81 ha) of pasture and 300 acres (120 ha) of moor.

== The Lawson era ==
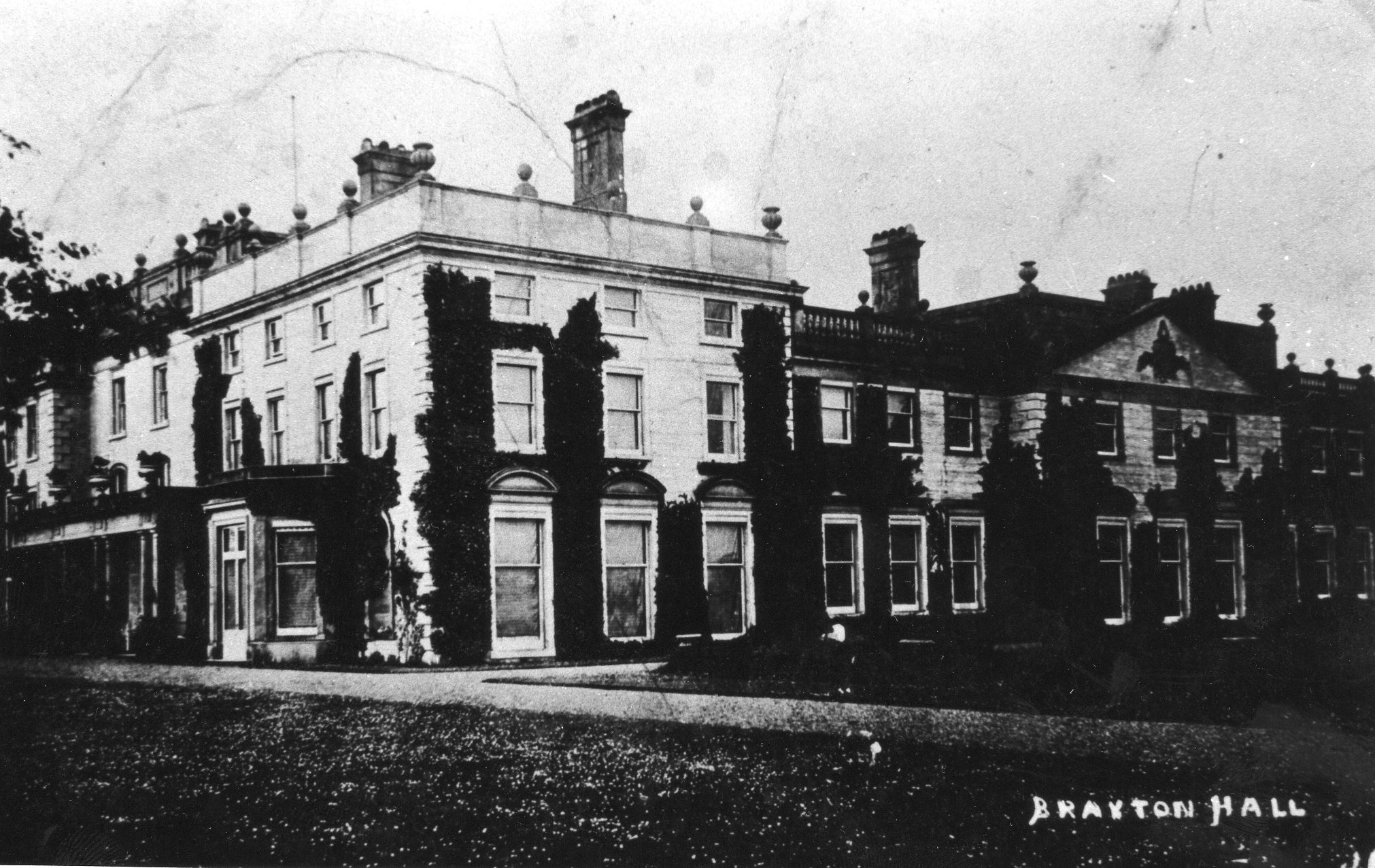
Brayton Hall looking from the southwest

Although there had been an existing manor house on the estate for many years, this was greatly improved in 1800 by the tenth baronet, who also developed the adjacent grounds, converted the existing deer park into a landscaped park, and in the process laid out extensive botanical gardens. The library, collected at a great expense, held a particularly rich collection of works on the subject of natural history. Among the pictures were many of the best works of contemporary English masters, particularly James Northcote and Philip Reinagle. The baronet also collected books, prints, paintings and suits of armour.

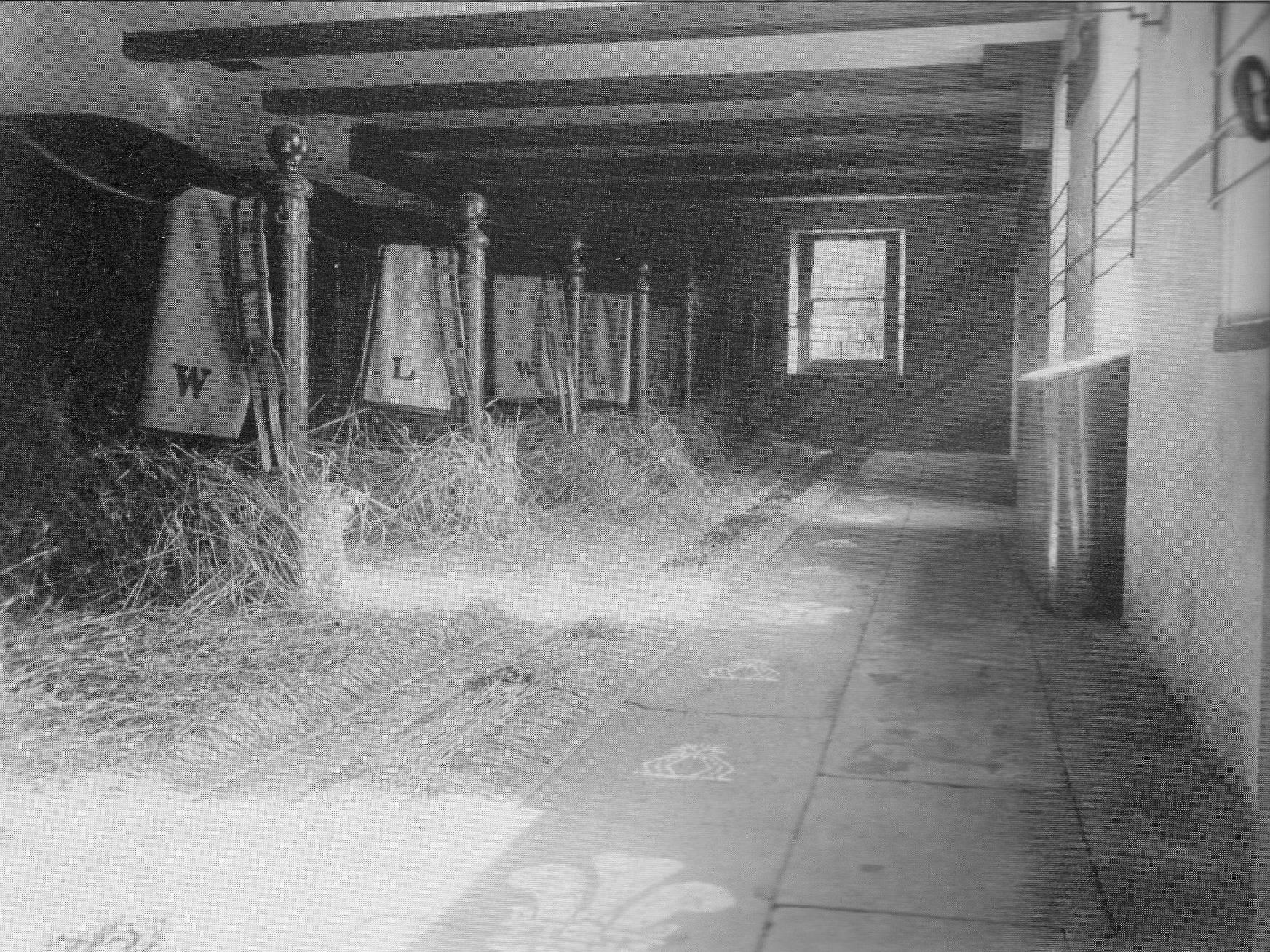
Brayton Hall stabling block, circa 1900

There were no further developments until the coming of the railway in 1843, when the first baronet of the second order, who was a principal shareholder in the construction of the Maryport and Carlisle Railway Company, built a railway station. Brayton Station, situated on the northern outskirts of his property, less than a mile from his home, required the additional facility of a manned lodge and carriageway. If his father made few alterations, the second baronet made sweeping changes. He had inherited a significant estate covering in excess of 6,500 acres. It comprised the residence, an eight-acre lake, and a well timbered park with an excellent range of stabling and farm buildings. He owned eight additional tenanted farms in close proximity to the estate: High Close, Hall Bank, Baggrow, Fitz, Mechi, Lower Baggrow, East Mill, Firs and Crookdake. In addition he also owned two commercial market gardens, with glass houses and other related facilities; numerous dwelling houses, cottages, accommodation lands and plantations.

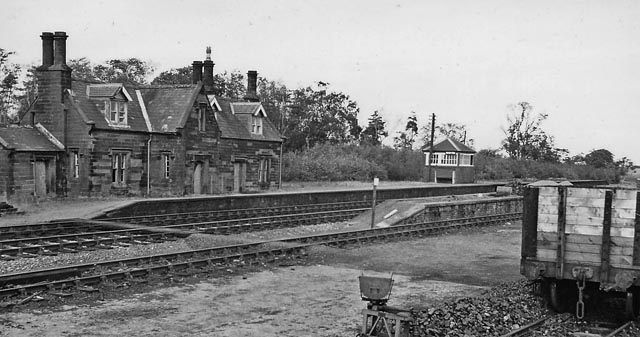
Remains of Brayton railway station in 1961

In 1868, Lawson greatly enlarged the house, forming a three-storey, stone-built mansion, in the form of a quadrangle enclosing an open court. He employed the famous interior designer John Crace to design and superintend the internal alterations. After the alterations Brayton presented a striking and unusual appearance with its south facing front and Italian gardens lying below the windows of the Morning Room and Library. Visitors entering the hall from the east passed through a projecting row of pillars, into the courtyard, where buildings occupied the other three sides. Entering the house visitors passed into a large hall, two stories in height with a balcony on one side supported by marble pillars, a large fireplace, having an inviting open fire, and a beautiful tiled floor, and elegantly furnished in the heaviest and richest manner. In the hall one could find the arms of the Lawson family and its alliances emblazoned around the oaken cornices. There was also a marble bust of Sir Wilfrid Lawson by John Adams-Acton. Leading from the hall were passages and staircases to a number of reception rooms and bedrooms, all elaborately furnished in a common theme. For example, there was the Ash Room, where all the furniture was made from ash; the Maple Room; the Ebony Room; the Bamboo Room; and the Sheraton Room. Perhaps the most imposing room was the Library. One visitor described it thus:

On a table in the centre window of the Library is a vast number of books; the speeches of Cobden, being as great a favourite as the works of Byron or the novels of Lord Beaconsfield. Each in its turn is carefully read, the salient passages are marked and perhaps committed to memory and the book goes to swell the ever increasing pile that not unfittingly represents the stores of an active and practical mind. On other tables are piled whole hosts of papers, documents, pamphlets, treatises and essays on the drink question.

=== Temperance demonstrations ===
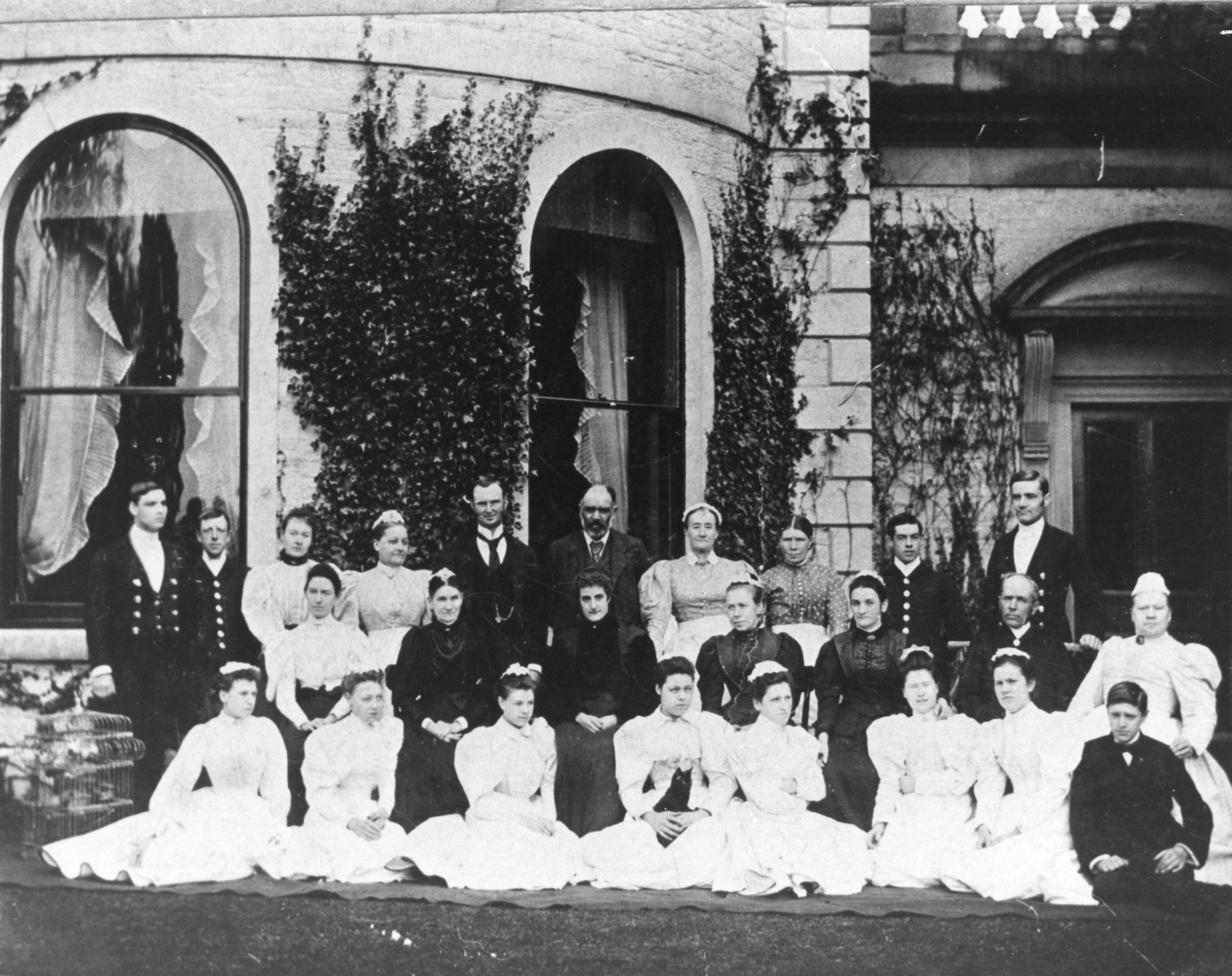
Brayton Hall In-house Servants circa 1890

The Lawsons always allowed public access to their grounds when they were not in residence, the only proviso being that the public respect the facilities and the vegetation. School children from neighbouring towns and villages were offered special encouragement; in 1870 over 1,000 children from the Maryport district converged on the estate, where they held a picnic, played games and partook in general entertainment In the winter months, climate permitting, local people could skate on the lake, while local bands performed musical concerts from the island. However, it was the annual Temperance demonstrations accompanied by their Horticultural shows that attracted the most attention. In August 1874, 20,000 enthusiastic supporters arrived at Brayton by special trains from all parts of the northern region and Scotland to show their force and highlight their loyalty to the cause. The proceedings began with a procession around the grounds, led by marching bands, with each lodge raising their respective banners. To facilitate the public meeting, the organisers erected a raised platform for the speakers, behind which were several tiers of seats for the use of local choirs. In addition to the host Sir Wilfrid Lawson, a number of invited guests, including political and temperance figures, addressed the crowds. In 1875, these included Thomas Burt, MP for Morpeth, A.M. Sullivan MP, the Reverend Basil Wilberforc and Joseph Mallins delivered their messages. Such shows of force provoked The Times newspaper to describe the gathering as Sir Wilfrid Lawson's’ 'dismal army'. Lawson responded by inviting the Licensed Victuallers National Defence League to organise a picnic at the same venue, where he would gladly address the gathering and where he might compare their behaviour with that of their rival persuasion. He made one stipulation, alcohol would not be for sale, but he promised not to restrict those who carried liquor on their person. Needless to say they ignored the invitation.

In December 1880 Lawson purchased the adjoining 200 acres (81 ha) Aspatria estate, costing approximately £11,500. The baronet became the chief landowner between Maryport and Carlisle.

=== Brayton shorthorns ===
The breed, originating in the northeast of England in the latter part of the 18th century, was ideal for both dairy and beef production. Pure-bred shorthorn cattle had been a feature at Brayton from the first half of the 19th century. The original animals came from the Benson and Charity strain. The pedigree went back to Volume 1 and 2 of the Coates's Herd Book where an entry records Violet the grand-dam of the original Benson tribe. In 1839, Lawson added stock from the Gwynne tribe and by careful breeding and future sales the breed dispersed throughout the country to the great improvement of the general stock. After the death of the first baronet in 1867, the new owner dispersed the herd, the 96 animals averaging a price of £34 each. Lawson retained a few cows for the dairy and the farm and after the introduction of some highly bred animals of the Bates blood, the herd soon revived. The Bates shorthorns commanded high prices. In 1874, George Moore, a neighbour and close friend of Lawson's paid £1,100 for an Oxford cow at the Duke of Devonshire’s sale. In the following year when he dispersed of his herd he sold the same cow for £2,200, while her three-month-old heifer calf realised £1,100, bought by the same Duke of Devonshire. However, it was not all good news for a cow he had bought for £1,000 three years earlier sold for only £60. A visitor to the estate in 1876, reported that Lawson owned 100 cows and a large number of bulls, all of Durham shorthorn stock. He understood that Lawson had paid £3,000 for a cow and owned a bull weighing 1,000 kilograms which he boasted was priceless. In October 1906, following the death of the second baronet, the third baronet sold the entire herd of 68 animals, the 61 cows and heifers realised an average of £37 each and the 7 bulls £42.

=== Brayton Hall fire ===
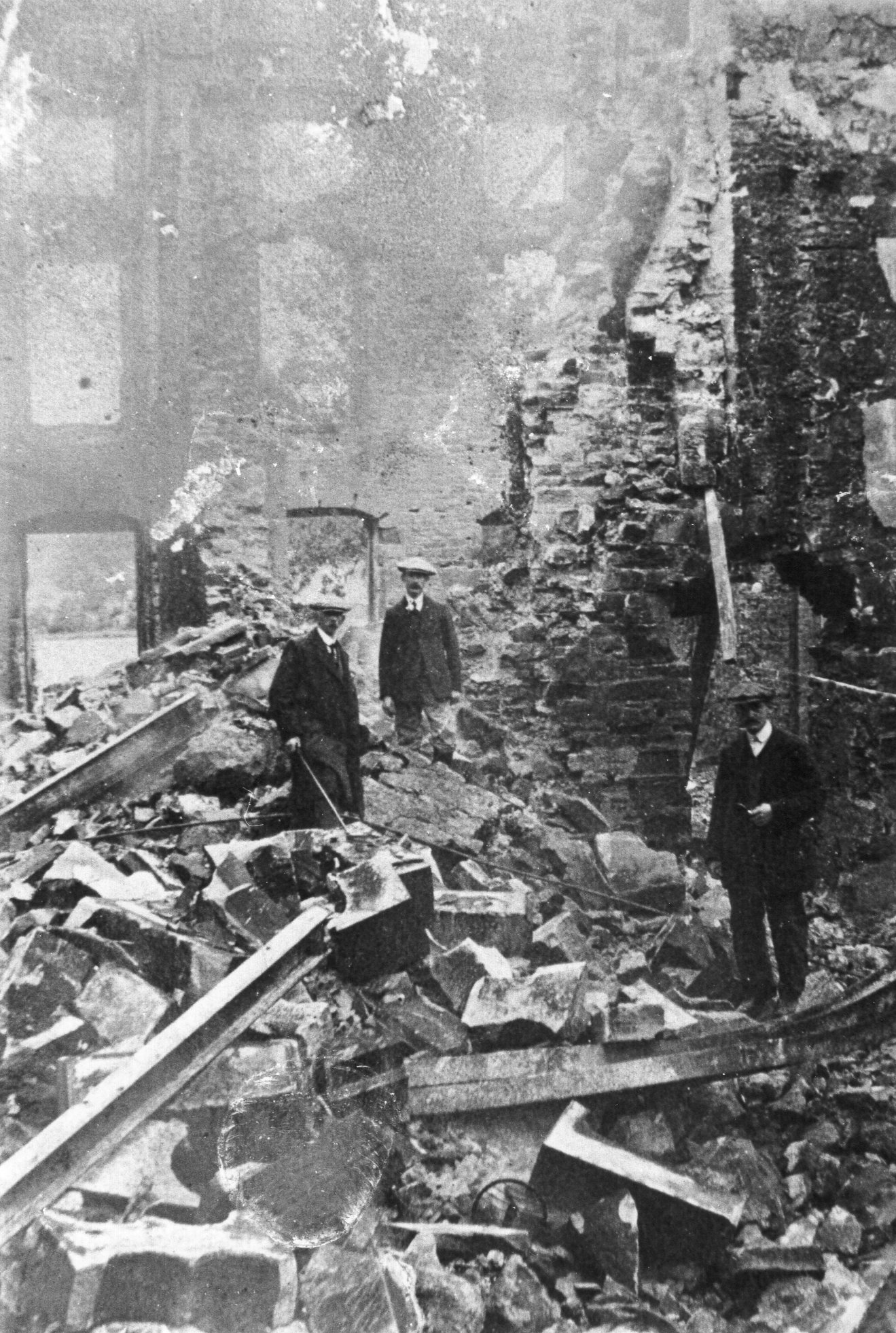
Aftermath of the Brayton Hall fire, circa 1918

Notwithstanding its splendour and magnificence, Brayton Hall had a very short life. On Saturday 21 September 1918, the hall was almost completely gutted by fire. What had been one of Cumberland's major showpieces – its wall enclosing priceless collections of furniture and works of art, assembled over centuries by various members of the family – became a roofless mass of broken masonry, charred wood and twisted iron. Since the death of his father, the third baronet, had preferred to live at Isel Hall; leaving Brayton unoccupied for most of that time. However the owner had promised the loan of Isel to a nephew, therefore preparations were at hand for Lawson's return. Craftsmen had busied themselves making internal alterations and all was in readiness from the carpets on the floors to the curtains at the windows. The fire started at 10.30am in the drawing room, situated at the angle of the main building in the south wing, where the furniture, not intended for use, sat in the centre of the room, covered with dust sheets. The servants had lighted the fire that morning, the first time in many weeks. Investigators later suggested two possible causes; one that a spark had jumped from the fire to the dust sheets; the other that a jackdaw’s nest in the chimney had fallen down scattering burning embers over the room. The caretaker raised the alarm, and although Joseph Berwick, surveyor to the Aspatria Urban District Council and Captain of the volunteer Fire Brigade was immediately at hand, to combat the flames, his efforts failed to prevent the catastrophe. The furniture in the centre of the room was blazing like a bonfire and within minutes the ceiling collapsed and although the staff attached the Fire hoses and began to tackle the blaze they could not prevent it spreading. The Aspatria Fire Brigade arrived with an army of local volunteers only to find that the strong wind was fanning the flames along the south and west wings. Although the Workington engine promptly arrived in the vicinity someone misdirected the driver and the heavy engine sank in the soft earth where it remained for over two hours. The polished floors, the lath and plaster walls, and the wood furniture offered the fire sufficient fuel, causing the roof to collapse and the flames to shoot into the air. Upon realising that they could not save the south and west wings, they concentrated on saving the north wing. They stripped the roof, tore down the woodwork and prevented the fire from travelling further. So quickly did the fire spread that they lost everything in the Drawing Room, the Maple, the Ash, the Bamboo and Ebony Rooms. However they saved the most valuable furniture housed in the Sheraton Room, in addition to the books in the Library and the contents of the Billiard room. A further calamity occurred after helpers hastily deposited the salvaged articles in the open space; where heavy rain caused further damage. Two John Hoppner paintings valued at £5,000 each were burnt, as were the portraits of the tenth baronet and his wife Anne by the same artist. They also lost the armour belonging to the same baronet. At 9.00pm they had the fire under control. On the following day many onlookers assembled to survey the damage.

=== Description of the smaller mansion ===
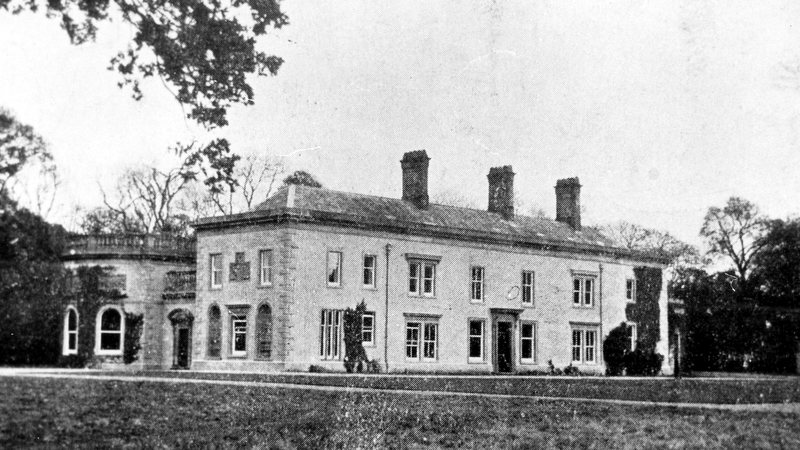
Brayton Hall circa 1920

After the disastrous fire of 1918, which destroyed the entire front and south wing the third baronet demolished the ruins and reconstructed a smaller mansion around the remnants of the north wing. The tilled entrance to the smaller residence opened out on the left to a Dining Room in the shape of a clover leaf, with Oak panelled Dado (11metres x 9metres by 4.5metres high) lighted by three windows, with a service door to the kitchen quarters. On the right of the entrance was an Inner Hall (6.5m x 4m) lighted by two large windows, off which was the Drawing room (6.5m x 5.5m) lighted by one large double window facing south. The other rooms on the ground floor comprised a Smoking Room, Kitchen with two pantries off it, Scullery, Knife and Boot Cleaning room, Servants' hall, Gunroom, Lavatory; and two rooms, which were used as Estate offices. There was also a large cellar. The first floor comprised 6 bedrooms, bathroom and lavatory. The second floor was a repeat of the first.

== Brayton at war ==
In 1942, the Royal Air Force (RAF) requisitioned the Brayton Park estate, which afterwards became one of the last two all-new Satellite Landing Grounds (No. 39 SLG) for dispersed aircraft storage to open in Britain during the Second World War. After a delayed start a considerable numbers of aircraft flew in for storage under the control of No. 12 Maintenance Unit RAF at RAF Kirkbride. Officers and men of the RAF were billeted in the main hall and outhouses and within Nissen huts around the grounds. Two main runways were constructed for the airfield; one ran south – east from the main estate and the other ran east – west over the middle of the estate, the whole being enclosed by security fencing and barbed wire. Although Brayton saw several Supermarine Spitfires pass through it tended to process larger aircraft types; and the sight of four-engined Handley Page Halifaxes and Boeing B-17 Flying Fortresses were not uncommon. Less familiar residents in RAF service included two other American aircraft designs along with the Fortress, the tricycle undercarriage North American B-25 Mitchell medium bomber and single-engined Vultee A-31 Vengeance, designed as a dive bomber but destined to mainly see military service as a target tug. However it was one of Britain's best-loved aircraft which became Brayton's most numerous resident. Examples of the Vickers Wellington had flown into Brayton right from the beginning of the airfield's life, numbers in time reaching well into three figures. Many were still at Brayton by the end of the Second World War in Europe but peacetime then saw these aircraft fairly quickly depart to Kirkbride, leaving their former SLG home to officially close on 31 January 1946.

== Brayton post war ==
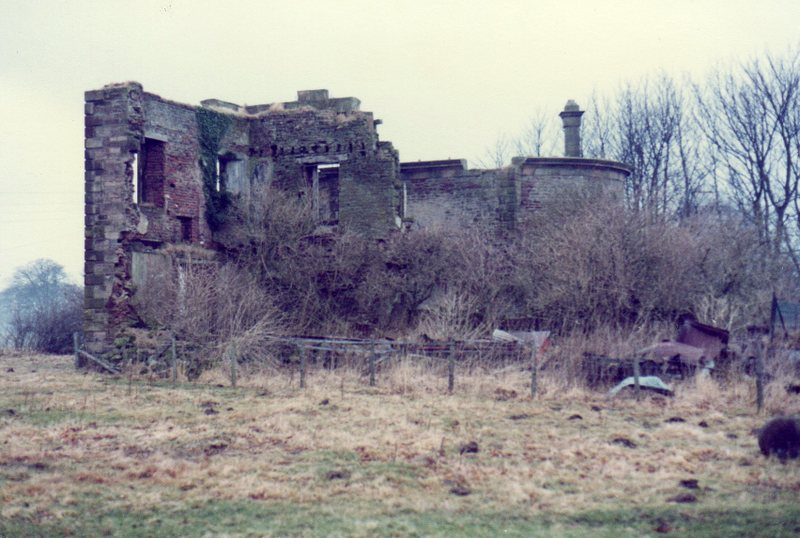
Brayton 1980

The estate was purchased in 1939 by Henry Dryden Ward from Wolsingham, County Durham. After the Second World War his son Robert Henry and his wife Lena moved into Home Farm with their two young sons Dryden and Barrie. The hall fell into disrepair and much of the stonework was taken down and removed to Wolsingham by Henry Dryden Ward, which was later used to build Rogerley Hall on the outskirts of the village. This family still own the estate today. For many years they used the remainder of the derelict building as a knackery, they ran a successful sawmill business then turned their hand to the leisure industry. They designed and built a nine-hole golf course, while continuing to allow fishing in the lake. The gardener's cottage, now a separate business is a flourishing restaurant, licensed to sell alcohol.

== Bibliography ==
- T. Bulmer (1901). History and Directory of Cumberland. Preston: T. Bulmer & Co. Hesperus Press Ltd.
- J. Rose; M. Dunglinson (1987). Aspatria. Chichester: Philmore & Co. Ltd.
- William Parsons; William White (1829). History, Directory, and Gazetter, of the Counties of Cumberland and Westmorland, with that part of the Lake District in Lancashire. Leeds: W. White & Co.
- William Whellan (1860). The History and Topography of the Counties of Cumberland and Westmoreland, Comprising Their Ancient and Modern History, a General View of Their Physic. Pontefract: W. Whellan and Co.
- William Parsons; William White (1829). HISTORY, DIRECTORY, AND GAZETTEER, OF THE COUNTIES OF CUMBERLAND AND WESTMORLAND, with that part of the Lake District in Lancashire, forming the lordships of Furness and Cartmel. Leeds: William White & Co.
- J. R. Mitchell (1924). Auction Catalogue for the sale of the Brayton Estate. Cockermouth: J. R. Mitchell.
- Samuel Smiles (1891). George Moore. London: George Routledge.
