= Bushley =

Village in Worcestershire, England

Coordinates: 52.007877°N 2.183349°W

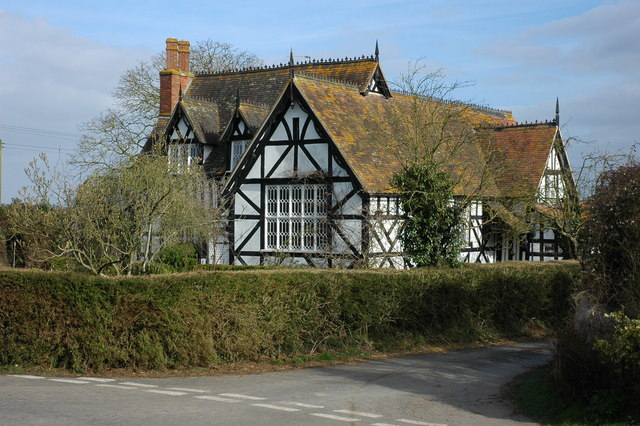

- Location within Worcestershire
- Population: 372
- Civil parish: Bushley
- District: Malvern Hills
- Shire county: Worcestershire
- Region: West Midlands
- Country: England
- Sovereign state: United Kingdom
- Post town: Tewkesbury
- Postcode district: GL20
- Police: West Mercia
- Fire: Hereford and Worcester
- Ambulance: West Midlands
- UK Parliament: West Worcestershire

Bushley is a small village and civil parish in the Malvern Hills district in Worcestershire, England. The church is dedicated to Saint Peter. At the 2021 census, the population was 372.

Bredon School is located to the north of the village.

== History ==
The name Bushley derives from the Old English byscelēah meaning 'wood/clearing by a copse of bushes'.

William Dowdeswell (1721–1775), the Worcestershire MP from 1761 until his death, was brought up at Pull Court in Bushley. Racing driver Richard Seaman (1913-1926), also lived at Pull Court.
