= Edward Hasell =

NZ international rugby union player

- Full name: Edward William Hasell
- Born: 26 April 1889 Christchurch, New Zealand
- Died: 7 April 1966 (aged 76) Christchurch, New Zealand

Rugby union career
- Position: Hooker
International career
Years	Team	Apps	(Points)
1913	New Zealand	2	(3)

Edward William "Nuts" Hasell (26 April 1889 — 7 April 1966) was a New Zealand rugby union international.

Born in Christchurch, Hasell was a Merivale and Canterbury player, capped twice by the All Blacks against the touring 1913 Australians. He played as a forward but was a noted goal-kicker, specialising in the now obsolete goal from mark.

Hasell served with the NZ Field Artillery in World War I and toured with the New Zealand Army team. He was known as "Nuts" in rugby circles.

In 1920, Hasell toured New South Wales with the All Blacks and featured in five matches. Two of his appearances, against the Waratahs, were uncapped, but are considered Test matches by Australia.

Hasell was a member of the Canterbury side which were the only provincial side to beat the visiting Springboks in 1921.

== See also ==
- List of New Zealand national rugby union players
