= Daniel Fleming (antiquary) =

English antiquarian and politician (1633–1701)

Sir Daniel Fleming (1633–1701), was an English antiquarian and politician.

== Life ==
Fleming was born on 25 July 1633, the eldest son of William Fleming of Coniston, North Lancashire, and Rydal, Westmoreland, by Alice, eldest daughter of Roger Kirkby of Kirkby, Lancashire. He was educated at The Queen's College, Oxford, which he entered in 1650, and Gray's Inn.

By the death of his father in 1653 Fleming inherited considerable estates in the neighbourhood of Rydal, for which he paid heavy fines to the parliament. At the Restoration he was appointed sheriff of Cumberland. He was a constant correspondent of Secretary Joseph Williamson: his letters, which went to the Public Record Office, afford a lively picture of the state of affairs in Cumberland and Westmorland during the latter half of the 17th century. They exhibit him as a staunch supporter of the Church of England, and enemy alike of the Protestant dissenter and the Roman Catholic. He regretted the release of George Fox in 1666 as likely to discourage the justices from acting against the Quakers, and gave credence to reports of their burning "steeple houses".

He was knighted on 15 May 1681 at Windsor, and in the parliament of 1685–1687 sat as member for Cockermouth; he opposed the Declaration of Indulgence.

He occupied his leisure in antiquarian researches, chiefly in connection with his native county, and left some manuscript collections, which were edited for the Cumberland and Westmoreland Antiquarian Society under the title "Description of the County of Westmoreland".

Fleming is said by Thomas Wotton to have been an assistant in the annotation of William Camden's Britannia; no acknowledgment, however, is to be found in the preface to Edmund Gibson's edition. It was at Fleming's suggestion that Thomas Brathwaite left his collection of coins of the Roman era to the University of Oxford.

His book collecting and collection have been assessed, especially his collations. Of these Nicholas Barker has observed: "In every book, he wrote his name on the front endpaper or title page, numbered the unpaginated preliminaries (including blank versos), and wrote 'exam'd' on the last leaf... In addition, he wrote the title in abbreviated form (two to four letters) above a bar with two strokes at either end at the head of the title, and on the inner front board, usually uncovered by an endpaper."

He died in 1701.

== Family ==
Fleming married in 1655 Barbara, eldest daughter of Sir Henry Fletcher of Hutton, Cumberland, who was killed at Rowton Heath on the side of the king in 1645. His eldest son, William, created a baronet 4 October 1705, died in 1736, and was succeeded by his brother Sir George Fleming, 2nd Baronet, bishop of Carlisle.
