= Listed buildings in Carlisle =

Carlisle is an unparished area in the Cumberland unitary authority area, of Cumbria, England. It contains about 350 buildings that are recorded in the National Heritage List for England. Of these, 24 are listed at Grade I, the highest of the three grades, 26 are at Grade II*, the middle grade, and the others are at Grade II, the lowest grade.

Carlisle is a city with a cathedral and is the county town of Cumbria. During the Roman era, it was the most northernmost city of the Roman Empire, and contained the largest fort on Hadrian's Wall. In 1122 an Augustinian priory was established by Henry I, this later becoming the cathedral. Also during the 12th century and later, the fortifications, including the city walls and the castle, were strengthened to defend against raids from the Scots. The city began to grow from the middle of the 18th century, stimulated by the building of the turnpikes towards Newcastle upon Tyne and London in the 1750s, followed by a canal and later the railway. It grew as an ecclesiastical and commercial centre and the cotton industry developed in the city. Fine houses were built, many in Georgian style, initially mainly around the city centre, and later in the growing suburbs.

The listed buildings largely reflect the city's history. The earliest buildings are what is left from the defensive fortifications and from the priory. These are followed by civic structures, such as the Guildhall, the former Town Hall, and the market cross. Most of the later buildings are, or originated as, houses and shops, many of which have since been converted for other uses, particularly offices. As the town grew, terraces of fine houses were built in the Warwick Road area, around squares containing central gardens such as Chatsworth and Portland Squares, and along Victoria Place. Not all the houses are in the more central areas, groups of listed houses being found for example in the former villages of Botcherby to the east of the city, and Stanwix to the north of the River Eden, and now in the unparished area. The other listed buildings include a variety of structures, including churches, inns, public houses and hotels, a bridge and a viaduct, a former brewery, former cotton mills, railway stations, banks, statues, memorials, cemetery buildings, a hospital, a disused gasholder, a pillbox, and a market.

== Key ==
Grade	Criteria
I	Buildings of exceptional interest, sometimes considered to be internationally important
II*	Particularly important buildings of more than special interest
II	Buildings of national importance and special interest

== Buildings ==
Name and location	Photograph	Date	Notes	Grade
10–22 West Walls; 54.89276°N 2.93689°W	—	Early 12th century	A section of the city walls has been preserved by being incorporated into a row of buildings. The buildings originally included a mews stables in the late 19th century, warehouses, and a school in 1813. These have subsequently been altered and used for other purposes.	I
Keep, Carlisle Castle; 54.89702°N 2.94105°W		Early 12th century	The keep was altered in the mid-16th century and again in the 19th century. It is built in sandstone with thick walls on a stepped chamfered plinth, with broad pilasters and a battlemented parapet with splayed embrasures. The keep has an almost square plan, measuring 60 feet (18 m) by 67 feet (20 m). In the east face is a recessed doorway. Some arrow slits remain and others have been widened into sash or casement windows. On the north side is a stepped gun ramp. Included in the listing are the quartermaster's store dating from 1827, and the remaining rear wall of the governor's house dating from 1577.	I
Carlisle Cathedral; 54.89480°N 2.93846°W		c. 1132	The building started as a priory and was elevated to cathedral status in 1133. Since then there have been numerous additions and alterations, including repairs following the fall of the tower in 1380. There was a major restoration in 1852–56 by Ewan Christian. The cathedral is built in calciferous sandstone and red sandstone on a chamfered plinth, and consists of a nave, north and south transepts, a choir longer than the nave, and a tower at the crossing with a battlemented parapet and a higher stair turret. Other features include stepped buttresses rising to form pinnacles, coped gables with cross finials, and the nine-light east window 51 feet (16 m) high.	I
Captain's Tower and Inner Bailey Walls; 54.89718°N 2.94143°W		12th century	The oldest part is the walls, the tower dating from the 13th century, and there were later alterations. They are all built in calciferous sandstone and red sandstone. The walls have buttresses broad pilasters, and a parapet, and surround the inner bailey, which has a roughly triangular plan. The tower has three storeys, and contains a pointed archway and mullioned windows. Above the rear of the arch is blind 14th-century tracery.	I
Fragment of north City Walls; 54.89695°N 2.93994°W	—	12th century	The wall is built in red sandstone with some calciferous sandstone, some of which came from the Roman wall. It is partly on a plinth and in part is a flagged parapet walk, and rounded coping. As it goes down a hill it is stepped, and at an angle there is a sallyport. There is also a projecting canted turret dating from the 15th or 16th century.	I
West City Walls; 54.89314°N 2.93781°W		12th century	The city walls have been repaired and re-faced on a number of occasions. They are in red sandstone with some calciferous sandstone and some re-used Roman stone, partly on a chamfered plinth. In some parts the parapet forms a pavement, and in other parts buildings were constructed against it. The buildings were demolished in 1988 and their foundation stones were incorporated in the walls. Steps have been built from the walls leading to Town Dyke Orchard, and at the south end is a further flight of steps and a sally port.	I
West City Walls and Tile Tower; 54.89612°N 2.94280°W		12th century	The tower and walls are in red sandstone and calciferous sandstone, some of it re-used Roman stones, on a chamfered plinth. The walls have external buttresses, the internal face is in 19th-century brick, and there is a parapet walk. The tower projects and has two storeys, a flat roof, arrow slits, and on the right side is a sandstone panel. At the rear are two elliptical-headed doorways.	I
Bridge over outer moat 54.89671°N 2.94158°W		Medieval	Originally a drawbridge leading into Carlisle Castle, later converted into an overbridge, it is mainly in red sandstone. The drawbridge abutments were heightened between 1778 and 1791, and a brick arch was added. The bridge has a solid parapet, a roadway of Whin setts, and a pedestrian walk in sandstone.	I
De Ireby's Tower and outer bailey wall 54.89677°N 2.94179°W		1167–68	The tower forms the gatehouse to Carlisle Castle, and was reconstructed in 1378–83 for domestic occupation. It is in calciferous sandstone and red sandstone. with pilasters and a lead roof on the tower. The tower has three stages and a roughly L-shaped plan. It has a segmental outer arch and a pointed inner arch, it is battlemented, and it contains sash windows. Above the outer arch is a blank panel set into a barbican. The outer bailey is approximately rectangular in shape, and its walls contain interval towers.	I
Former Priory wall and Deanery garden wall 54.89445°N 2.94012°W		12th or 13th century	The wall runs along the edge of the former priory garden and part of the deanery garden. The section along West Walls is mainly in sandstone with extensive repairs in brick, it is partly coped, and contains a blocked round-arched doorway. At the northwest corner it turns at right angles to the east, and this section is in brick.	II
Ruins of Dormitory of former Priory of St Mary; 54.89442°N 2.93879°W		Mid to late 13th century	The ruins of the former dormitory are in large blocks of red sandstone. It was originally a two-story building extending from the fratry to the cathedral. Only part of the lower storey of the west wall survives, and a small portion of the east wall. The west wall contains a pointed-arched doorway, and springers for the rib vaulting of the undercroft.	I
Fratry of former Priory of St Mary; 54.89431°N 2.93904°W		c. 1300	The former refectory of the priory, it has since been extended and altered and used for other purposes. The building was remodelled in the late 15th century, and restored in 1809–11 by Robert Smirke and again in 1880–81 by G. E. Street. It is in sandstone on a chamfered plinth, with stepped buttresses, an eaves cornice, a solid parapet, angle pinnacles, and a green slate roof with coped gables and a cross finial. The building consists of an undercroft with a six-bay hall and a service bay above. On the south side is a projecting octagonal turret, and on the north side is a two-bay porch.	I
Palace Range, Carlisle Castle; 54.89719°N 2.94067°W		1301–07	The range was converted into a barracks in 1821 and later into a museum. It is built in red sandstone blocks and has a green slate roof with a coped gable at the left. Along the front are four sash windows. In the left return are blocked doorways, and on the right side is a projecting stair turret that was formerly internal and part of a gatehouse, and which has an embattled parapet.	I
Guildhall; 54.89489°N 2.93640°W		1398–1407 (probable)	A timber-framed hall with a Cumbrian slate roof, later altered and used for other purposes, including a museum. It has three storeys and an L-shaped plan, with three bays on Greenmarket and five on Fisher Street. The ground floor was probably originally open, and is now filled with stuccoed walls and round-headed windows. In the upper floors are moulded jetties and cornices, the middle floor containing weatherboarding, and the top floor medieval tiles. The windows are varied and include sashes, some horizontally sliding, casements, and one oriel window.	I
The Deanery and Prior's Tower; 54.89414°N 2.93937°W		Late 15th century	The oldest part is the tower, to which additions were made in the 17th and 19th centuries. The buildings are in sandstone on a chamfered plinth, the tower has a battlemented parapet and a lead roof, and elsewhere the roofs are of green slate. The tower has three storeys over a basement, and to the right is a two-storey three-bay hall range, a projecting two-storey extension, to the left is a three-storey three-bay extension, and beyond this are single-storey four-bay stables. In the tower is an oriel window, and elsewhere there are casement and mullioned windows.	I
Tithe barn 54.89327°N 2.93752°W		c. 1470s	The tithe barn was provided for the priory, it was altered in the 19th century, and restored in 1969–71, converting it into a parish room. It is in sandstone with a roof of sandstone flags. At the restoration the west wall was rebuilt in concrete blocks, creating an additional storey, the rest of the building being in a single storey. Along the south wall are ventilation slits, and at the east end is a doorway and a window.	I
Abbey Gate and Gatehouse; 54.89469°N 2.93996°W		1528	This is the gate tower to St Mary's Priory and its gatehouse. It is in red sandstone on a chamfered plinth, some of the dressings are in calciferous sandstone, and there are string courses, an eaves cornice, clasping buttresses rising to become chimney stacks, and a green slate roof with coped gables. The building consists of a two-storey single-bay gate tower, and a low two-storey two-bay gatehouse. On the front and the rear are rounded archways, and above them on each side is a three-light Tudor window with a hood mould.	I
Nisi Prius Courthouse, offices and gate arch 54.89224°N 2.93294°W		1541–43	The original east tower of the Citadel, altered in the early 19th century by Thomas Telford and Robert Smirke and since been used as a court and offices. The tower is in sandstone on a chamfered plinth and has string courses, a machicolated cornice in parts, and battlemented parapets. Attached to the northwest of the tower is a two-storey, six-bay office block in Gothic style and a mock gate projection.	I
Half Noon battery, walls and bridge 54.89718°N 2.94166°W		1542	The whole structure is in red and yellow sandstone. The battery has a single storey and is in a half-moon shape. There are gun ports around the side, it has a cobbled roof, and metal railings around the side. The flanking walls acts as a retaining wall for the inner moat, and at the southern end is a bridge, dating from the late 18th century, with a single segmental arch.	I
20 Wood Street; 54.89212°N 2.90138°W	—	Mid 17th century	A rendered house on a red sandstone plinth, that has a green slate roof with coped gables. There are two storeys and two bays. The doorway and sash windows have plain surrounds, and above the windows are keystones.	II
Old Town Hall; 54.89474°N 2.93583°W		1668–69	The town hall was extended to the right in 1717 and to the left in the 19th century, and it has a green slate roof. The original part is stuccoed on a chamfered plinth, with a sandstone eaves cornice, a parapet, and a bellcote. It has a single storey with a basement, and seven bays. On the front are two flights of external serpentine steps with railings, leading to a doorway with a stone architrave and a pediment with the city arms and ball finials. The right extension is in sandstone with dressings in calciferous sandstone, quoins, an eaves cornice, and a clock tower cupola. It has two bays on the front and five on the side, giving an L-shaped plan. The left extension is in stuccoed brick with pilasters, three storeys, and one bay. Most of the windows are sashes in stone architraves.	I
2 The Abbey; 54.89466°N 2.93955°W		1669–70	The house is built in stone from Wetheral Priory, it was extended in the early 18th century, and alterations were made in 1888 by C. J. Ferguson. The stone is red sandstone, it is on a chamfered plinth, and the house has quoins and a green slate roof with coped gables; the extension is in brick. There are two storeys and five bays in a double span. The doorway has a quoined surround, a frieze, and a cornice hood, and the windows are sashes in stone surrounds. At the rear is a round-headed stair window.	II*
1 The Abbey; 54.89433°N 2.93835°W	—	Late 17th century (probable)	Originally two houses, later combined into one, it is in brick with light headers on a chamfered plinth, with dressings of red sandstone, angle pilasters, and a roof mainly of green slate with some sandstone. There are two storeys, five bays, and a rear extension, giving an L-shaped plan. The doorway has a bolection surround, a pulvinated frieze, and a fanlight. The outer bays contain full-height bay windows, the one on the left is squared, and the one on the right is canted. The other windows are sashes.	II
3 and 6 The Abbey; 54.89439°N 2.93793°W		Late 17th century	A prebendal house, later altered and divided into two houses. It is in brick on a chamfered plinth, with stone dressings, a dentilled string course, an eaves cornice, and a green slate roof with coped gables. The main block has two storeys and seven bays, a right single-storey extension and a left extension of two storeys and two bays. The central doorway has a bolection surround with a pulvinated frieze, and the windows are sashes in segmental-arched stone architraves. At the rear is a central stair projection.	II*
Eaglesfield House; 54.89481°N 2.94045°W	—	Late 17th century	A house, much altered in the 18th century, later used as two shops with offices above. It is in brick on a chamfered plinth, and has a tile roof. There are three storeys and four bays, and it has a double-depth plan. The main doorway is round-headed, flanked by columns, and has a blank fanlight and an open pediment. To the right is another doorway, flat-headed, with a fanlight and a pediment. To the left of the main doorway is a shop front, and elsewhere are sash windows.	II
Wall, gate and railings, Tullie House; 54.89494°N 2.94048°W		Late 17th century	The gate piers and wall are in sandstone. The piers are rusticated on moulded plinths, and are surmounted by projecting cornices with bracketed ball finials. These are flanked by a low wall on a moulded plinth with a flat moulded coping. The gates and railings are in cast iron, the railings being speared and scrolled.	I
Market Cross; 54.89450°N 2.93570°W		1682	The cross is in calciferous sandstone, partly stuccoed. Five circular steps lead up to a square base on a chamfered plinth. On this is an unfluted Ionic column carrying a sundial. On the top and bottom corners of the sundial are ball and spear finials, and it is surmounted by the statue of a lion holding a scroll containing the city arms. On the faces of the sundial are Roman numerals and metal gnomons.	I
Tullie House and extensions 54.89520°N 2.94046°W		1689	The house has been extended and developed into a museum with other buildings, the major extension being by C. J. Ferguson in 1982–93. The original house is in red sandstone with dressings in calciferous sandstone, quoins, eaves modillions, a cornice, and a green slate roof. There are two storeys, seven bays, and a double-depth plan. The central doorway has a bolection surround, a pulvinated frieze and a broken segmental pediment on consoles. The windows are sashes in architraves with alternating triangular and broken pediments. The extensions include the former librarian's house that has a clock tower and a copper-domed cupola and a weathervane, a library, a museum, and a natural history gallery.	I
Bishop's Registry; 54.89458°N 2.93993°W		1699	This originated as the cathedral library. It is in brick on a sandstone plinth, with dressings of calciferous sandstone, quoins, an eaves cornice, and a green slate roof with coped gables. The building has one storey and two bays. The doorway has a bolection architrave with a swan-neck pediment that encloses a bishop's mitre. The windows are mullioned in bolection architraves.	II*
Norman House and Norman Nook; 54.89220°N 2.90193°W	—	1700	A house, later divided into two houses, rendered on a chamfered plinth, with stone dressings and a green slate roof. It has two storeys, three bays, and a rear extension. There is a doorway with a bolection surround, and the windows are sashes with plain reveals and stone sills.	II
48 Abbey Street; 54.89469°N 2.94026°W	—	Late 17th or early 18th century	Originally a house and workshop, later used for other purposes, it is in brick on a chamfered plinth and has a green slate roof. There are two storeys and four bays, the right three bays being symmetrical. The doorway has a bolection architrave with a pulvinated frieze and a cornice, and the windows are sashes in plain stone surrounds. In the left bay is a doorway with a plain surround, and above it is a sash window with a flattened arch and a false keystone.	II
14 and 16 Castle Street; 54.89573°N 2.94016°W		Late 17th or early 18th century	Two houses, originally three, in brick on a chamfered plinth with a Welsh slate roof, in two storeys, and with two bays each. No. 14 is the older, the left bay contains a 20th-century door and shop front with a small casement window above. The right bay is narrower, recessed, and contains a round-headed window (previously a door) and a sash window above. No, 16 dates from the late 18th century, and was originally two houses of one bay each. In the centre is a double door in a stone surround. The windows are sashes, those in the ground floor having wedge lintels.	II
14, 16 and 18 Kells Place; 54.90566°N 2.93385°W	—	Early 18th century	A row of four houses, extended at the rear in the 20th century, they are rendered and have a green slate roof. The houses have two storeys and two bays each. The doors and sash windows have stone surrounds. In front of the houses is a cobbled area.	II
3 Paternoster Row and outbuildings 54.89493°N 2.93980°W	—	Early 18th century (probable)	A house and former stables. The house is stuccoed on a chamfered plinth, with pilastered quoins to the right, a modillioned cast iron gutter, and a Welsh slate roof. It has two storeys, four bays, a lower two-storey, two-bay extension at the rear, beyond which are two-storey two-bay former stables. The doorway of the house has a patterned fanlight and a pilastered surround with a reeded entablature containing roundels, and a modillioned cornice. In the left bay is a carriage entrance, and the windows are sashes in wooden architraves. In the extension and former stables are casement windows, and the stables also have loft doors and ventilation slits.	II
18 Wood Street; 54.89204°N 2.90151°W	—	Early 18th century	Originally a farmhouse, later a private house, it has rendered walls on a red sandstone plinth, and a slate roof. There are two storeys and two bays, with a doorway to the left. The windows are sashes in plain reveals and with stone sills.	II
Holme Farmhouse; 54.89215°N 2.90231°W	—	Early 18th century	The farmhouse, later a private house, is rendered on a chamfered plinth, and has stone dressings and a slate roof. There are two storeys, two bays, a central doorway in a chamfered stone surround, and sash windows in plain reveals with stone sills. At the rear is an outshut with a catslide roof.	II
The Sportsman Inn; 54.89345°N 2.93659°W		Early 18th century	A public house with rendered walls on a chamfered plinth with a slate roof. There are two low storeys and four bays. The doorway is flanked by windows and wooden pilasters, and the other windows are sashes with plain surrounds and stone sills.	II
4–16 St Alban's Row; 54.89488°N 2.93587°W	—	Early to mid 18th century	Originally a terrace of houses, now four shops, rendered and with roofs partly of Welsh slate and partly of green slate. They have three storeys and two or three bays each. In the ground floor are shop fronts, and above are sash windows, some in stone architraves.	II
Church Farmhouse, railings and barn 54.89249°N 2.90056°W	—	Mid 18th century	The house and barn are in brick with green slate roofs. The house is on a chamfered plinth with stone dressings. It has two storeys, three bays, and a double-depth plan. The door has an integral fanlight, a quoined surround, and a false keystone. The windows are sashes, and the left return is slate-hung. The barn to the right is on a sandstone plinth. In front is a low stone wall with speared railings and a cobbled area.	II
The Cottage and former stable 54.89224°N 2.90169°W	—	18th century (probable)	Originally a farmhouse and attached stable, it was later converted into a private house. The house is roughcast on a chamfered roughcast plinth, and it has a Welsh slate roof. There are two storeys and three bays, with the single-bay single-storey former stable to the right. The door and casement windows date from the 20th century.	II
Durranhill Lodge; 54.88775°N 2.89490°W	—	Mid 18th century	Originally a farmhouse, later a lodge, and then a private house, it is in brick with stone dressings, quoins, and a roof mainly of Welsh slate with some stone slate, and with coped gables. There are two storeys, three bays, and a central doorway in a stone surround. The windows are sashes in stone surrounds, those in the ground floor being mullioned with two lights, and those in the upper floor being smaller.	II
Morton Cottage and 210-212 Wigton Road; 54.88290°N 2.96927°W	—	Mid 18th century	A house with a barn to the left; the house is rendered on a chamfered plinth, with stone dressings, quoins, a rusticated pilaster, an eaves cornice, and a hipped green slate roof. There are two storeys, the main part has seven bays, there is a one-bay extension to the right, and a further lower two-bay extension beyond that. The main part has a doorway with a radial fanlight and a pilastered porch on which is the statue of a lion. To the left is a Venetian window with a stepped dentilled cornice, and there is another Venetian window to the right. The other windows are sashes in stone architraves. The barn is in brick and has a local slate roof.	II
9 Fisher Street; 54.89628°N 2.93836°W	—	1760s	A stuccoed house with a tile roof, in three storeys and five bays. The central doorway has pilasters, a pediment, and a frieze with triglyphs and metopes. The windows are sashes.	II
13 and 15 Castle Street and 2 Paradise Court; 54.89567°N 2.93947°W	—	Mid or late 18th century	Originally three houses, later combined into an office, the building is in brick with light headers on a stone plinth, with stone dressings, a modillioned cornice, a solid parapet, and a slate roof. There are two storeys, a front of eleven bays, a double-depth plan, a rear extension of four bays, and at a right angle are three bays forming No, 2 Paradise Court. In the centre of the front is a quoined segmental through-archway, and in the ground floor are 20th-century shop windows. The doorway to No. 13 Castle Street is flanked by columns and it has a fanlight, an open pediment, and a block entablature with dentils. The other doorway has pilasters, a pediment and console brackets. To the right is a quoined round-headed archway, and in the upper floor are sash windows with flat brick arches and false keystones.	II
3 and 4 Greenmarket; 54.89480°N 2.93653°W	—	Mid or late 18th century	Originally two houses, later two shops, they are stuccoed and have tile roofs. There are three storeys and each shop has two bays. In the ground floor are 20th-century shop fronts, and above are sash windows in stone architraves.	II
22 Wood Street; 54.89214°N 2.90121°W	—	Mid or late 18th century	The house has rendered walls and a Welsh slate roof. There is one storey, three bays, a door in a chamfered stone surround, and sash windows in plain reveals and with stone sills.	II
Orchard House; 54.89252°N 2.90026°W	—	Mid or late 18th century	A brick house on a chamfered plinth, with stone dressings and a roof of green slate with a sandstone ridge. There are two storeys, two bays, a single-depth plan, and a rear outshut. The doorway has a quoined surround, and the windows, which are sashes, have brick segmental arches. In front of the house is a cobbled area.	II
The Beeches and former outbuilding 54.89234°N 2.90116°W	—	1767	Originally a farmhouse with an attached barn or stable, and later a private house. It is stuccoed on a chamfered plinth, with stone dressings and a green slate roof. There are two storeys, three bays, and a single-storey, single-bay former outbuilding to the right. The doorway has a stone surround, and the windows are sashes with elliptical heads, keystones, and stone sills.	II
Bramerton and railings 54.89223°N 2.90064°W	—	Late 18th century (probable)	The house was altered in the 19th century. It is in brick with Welsh slate roofs, and has 2 1/2 storeys and four bays. The left bay was added later, it is recessed, and contains a porch with fluted Tuscan columns and a door in a stone architrave. The windows are sashes, and there is a central gabled half-dormer. In front of the house is a low wall with speared railings.	II
17 and 19 Abbey Street; 54.89482°N 2.94017°W	—	Late 18th century	Two houses in brick with light headers on a chamfered plinth, with stone dressings, quoins, and a green slate roof with coped gables. They have two storeys, and each house has two bays. Each house has a doorway with a fanlight and a pilastered surround with false imposts and keystones. The windows are sashes.	II
26 Abbey Street; 54.89507°N 2.94135°W	—	Late 18th century	A stuccoed house on a chamfered plinth, with quoins and a green slate roof. It two storeys with a basement, four bays, and a double-depth plan. Steps lead up to an off-centre doorway that has a fanlight, Ionic columns, an open pediment with a block entablature, and panelled reveals. The windows are sashes, and there are railings around the basement area. Many of the original internal features have been retained.	II*
28 and 30 Abbey Street; 54.89504°N 2.94116°W	—	Late 18th century	A pair of brick houses on a chamfered plinth with stone dressings, and a green slate roof with a left coped gable. They have two storeys, No. 28 has two bays, and No. 30 has four. Both houses have doorways with open pediments and fanlights. No. 28 has one bow window, all the other windows being sashes in brick surrounds and with flat brick arches.	II
34 Abbey Street; 54.89487°N 2.94075°W		Late 18th century	The house is in brick with light headers on a chamfered plinth, with a string course and a green slate roof. There are two storeys and four bays. In front of the house is a low wall with railings and steps leading up to a doorway with a radial fanlight and an open pediment. The windows are sashes with plain stone reveals, flat brick arches and stone sills.	II
6–12 Castle Street; 54.89578°N 2.94026°W	—	Late 18th century	A pair of houses, later used as shops, in brick with light headers, both with three storeys, shop windows in the ground floor, and sash windows above. No. 6–8 has a modillioned eaves cornice, two bays, a doorway with columns, a fanlight, and an open pediment, and a gabled roof dormer. No. 10–12 has three bays and a segmental-headed quoined carriage arch.	II
21 Castle Street; 54.89545°N 2.93891°W		Late 18th century	A house in Georgian style, later used for other purposes, in brick with light headers on a chamfered plinth, with dressings in calciferous sandstone, quoins, a dentilled cornice, and a green slate roof. There are two storeys, a symmetrical five-bay front, a double-depth plan, and an extension to the rear giving an L-shaped plan. Steps lead up to the central doorway that is flanked by Composite columns, and has an open pediment and a radial fanlight. The windows are sashes in stone architraves, and at the rear is a canted bay window. Inside, many original features have been retained.	II*
77–83 Castle Street and 1 Greenmarket; 54.89472°N 2.93675°W	—	Late 18th century	Originally a house, later three shops, it is in rendered brick, with bays, pilasters, and a slate roof. There are three storeys, seven bays on Castle Street, and one on Greenmarket. The doorway has a bolection doorcase, imposts, a keystone with carved leaves, and a fanlight. Elsewhere on the ground floor are 20th-century shop windows. In the upper floors are sash windows that have stone surrounds with segmental heads and false keystones. Above the central window in the middle floor is an inscribed panel.	II
11 English Street; 54.89429°N 2.93525°W	—	Late 18th century	A house, later a shop, in sandstone with dressings in calciferous sandstone, quoins, a dentilled cornice, and a green slate roof. It has three storeys, three bays, a shop front in the ground floor, and sash windows in stone architraves above.	II
18 Fisher Street; 54.89593°N 2.93811°W	—	Late 18th century	Originally two houses, later used for other purposes. The building is in brick with pale headers on a stone plinth, and has quoins, an eaves cornice, and a tile roof. There are three storeys with an attic, the original larger house has five bays and the other house has one. The doorway is approached up steps, it has columns, an open pediment and a fanlight. The windows are sashes, with a round headed stair window on the right return.	II*
92 Newtown Road; 54.89490°N 2.96220°W	—	Late 18th century	A brick house with a green slate roof, in two storeys and three bays, and with a rear outshut. The doorway has a stone surround and a wooden porch, and the windows in the main part are sashes with stone lintels and sills. In the outshut are sash and casement windows.	II
7 Paternoster Row; 54.89523°N 2.93927°W	—	Late 18th century	Originally a house, later a shop, in brick with a slate roof. There are three storeys and two bays, and it has a double-depth plan. In the ground floor is a modern shop front and a doorway to the right. The upper floors contain casement windows with moulded sills and flat brick arches with false keystones.	II
36, 38 and 40 Scotch Street; 54.89580°N 2.93568°W	—	Late 18th century	Originally three houses, later two shops with living accommodation above, they are stuccoed and have green slate roofs. They have three storeys, Nos. 36 and 38 have a four-bay front on Scotch Street, and a gable end on Old Blue Bell Lane; No, 40 is behind and has three bays on Old Blue Bell Lane. There are shop windows in the ground floor and sash windows in the floors above.	II
60 Scotch Street; 54.89517°N 2.93562°W	—	Late 18th century	Originally a coaching inn, later converted into two shops, it is in brick with quoins, a string course, a modillioned eaves cornice, and a green slate roof. There are three storeys and five bays. In the centre is a former through arch, flanked by 20th-century shop windows. Above the arch is a Venetian window, and over that is a three-light window. The other windows are sashes in stone architraves.	II
70 Scotch Street; 54.89490°N 2.93561°W	—	Late 18th century	A house, later a shop, incorporating fragments of an earlier building. It is stuccoed on a stone plinth, and has quoins and an eaves cornice. There are 2 1/2 storeys and two bays, with one gabled bay on the return facing Scotch Street. The shop has doorways with stone surrounds under a coved head, shop windows with elliptical-arched heads and, in the upper floors, sash windows. During restoration a fragment of a timber-framed building was found, and this has been retained.	II
Boardroom public house 54.89533°N 2.93919°W		Late 18th century	The public house is rendered on a chamfered plinth, with quoins, a bracketed gutter, and a green slate roof with coped gables. There are three storeys, four bays on the front and five on Paternoster Row. The doorway has a pilasterd surround and a fanlight, and the windows are sashes in stone architraves.	II
Botcherby House; 54.89218°N 2.90207°W	—	Late 18th century	The house has rendered walls with stone dressings and a Welsh slate roof. There are two storeys and three bays, the left bay being recessed. The doorway has a stone architrave, and the sash windows have plain reveals and stone sills.	II
Barn, Durranhill Lodge; 54.88779°N 2.89511°W	—	Late 18th century	The barn is in brick with some sandstone quoins, and a tiled roof. It has two storeys with a lean-to extension to the left. The barn contains doorways, loft doors, casement windows, and ventilation slits in diamond patterns.	II
Herbert Atkinson House; 54.89519°N 2.94114°W	—	Late 18th century	The house, later used for other purposes, is in brick with light headers on a chamfered plinth, and has stone dressings, a string course, an eaves cornice, and a Welsh slate roof. There are two storeys and five bays. In the centre is a round-headed doorway with a pilastered surround, imposts, a keystone and a radial fanlight. There is a through-passage doorway to the right, similar but less detailed. Above the central doorway is an inscribed stone. The windows are sashes with flat brick arches and keystones. Between the floors is a row of circular cast iron tie-beam plates.	II
Mulcaster House; 54.90440°N 2.93383°W	—	Late 18th century	The house was extended in the 19th century. It is stuccoed on a chamfered plinth, with angle pilasters, an eaves cornice, a solid parapet, and a green slate roof. The house has two storeys, five bays, a four-bay wing at the rear on the left, and a double-depth plan. The central three bays project forward and contain a prostyle Corinthian porch with swag ornament, an entablature, and a cornice. The windows are sashes in architraves, and in the left return is a pilastered doorway. Many of the internal features have been retained.	II*
Pheasant Inn; 54.89413°N 2.94740°W	—	Late 18th century	The former public house is in stuccoed brick with a green slate roof. There are two storeys, a front of five bays, and lower three-bay wings at the rear, giving a U-shaped plan. There are two doorways with patterned fanlights, and sash windows. In the centre of the upper floor is a canted oriel window.	II
Suttle House; 54.87940°N 2.97345°W	—	Late 18th century	A brick house with stone dressings and a green slate roof, partly hipped. It has two storeys and three bays, with a gabled single-bay extension on the left. The doorway has a stone surround and a Tuscan porch with sidelights, and a three-light window to the right. In the extension is a Venetian window in the ground floor and a three-light window above. There is another Venetian window in the left return, and all the other windows are sashes in stone architraves.	II
23 Fisher Street; 54.89527°N 2.93655°W	—	1776	Originally a Quaker meeting house, it was extended and given a new façade in 1867, and has since been used as a shop and offices. The building is in brick on a chamfered plinth and has dressings in calciferous sandstone, a rusticated ground floor, a string course, a parapet with a central panel, and a hipped Welsh slate roof. There are two storeys and five bays, the central three bays project forward, they are quoined, and contain round-headed arches.	II
31–37 Fisher Street; 54.89490°N 2.93621°W	—	1776	Originally two houses and a warehouse, later converted into two shops, they are stuccoed, they have 20th-century tiled roofs, and are in three storeys. Nos. 31–33 have a front of five bays; Nos. 35–37 are higher, they are on a curved corner site, and have one bay in Fisher Street and two on St Albans Row. In the ground floor are shop fronts. The windows in Nos. 31–33 and in the middle floor of Nos. 35–37 are sashes, and in the top floor of the latter are casements.	II
St Cuthbert's Church; 54.89380°N 2.93747°W		1778–79	The church is in Georgian style, and is built in red sandstone on a chamfered plinth. It has dressings of calciferous sandstone, quoins, a string course, a cornice, solid parapets, and a green slate roof with coped gables. The church consists of a two-storey nave, a low chancel, and a three-storey tower incorporating a porch. Along the sides of the nave are two tiers of square-headed casement windows, and at the east end is a Venetian window. The tower has an embattled parapet and a lead ogee cupola. Inside the church are galleries on three sides carried on Tuscan columns.	II*
17 Castle Street; 54.89559°N 2.93934°W	—	1798	A house later used as a shop, it is rendered on a rendered plinth, and has a string course, modillioned eaves, and a slate roof. There are three storeys, three bays, and a double depth plan. On the left, steps lead up to a doorway with a pilastered surround, a bracketed cornice, and a fanlight. The windows are sashes in stone architraves.	II
19 Castle Street; 54.89553°N 2.93916°W	—	1798	Originally a house, given a new façade in the 19th century, and used for other purposes. The façade is in calciferous sandstone, the other walls are in brick, all on a red sandstone plinth, and there are a string course, an eaves cornice, and a hipped slate roof. the building has three storeys, a symmetrical three-bay front, and a double-depth plan. On the front are three semicircular arches, the central arch containing double doors and a moulded entablature, and the outer arches with windows. Between and outside the arches are red sandstone pilasters with blocks containing paterae. In the middle floor, the central sash window has a hood mould, and the outer windows have three lights. At the rear is a two-storey bow window and a round-headed stair window.	II
1 and 3 Abbey Street; 54.89555°N 2.94191°W	—	Late 18th or early 19th century	Originally a house and shop, later one shop, it is stuccoed on a chamfered plinth, with a wooden cornice and a green slate roof, partly hipped. There are two storeys, three bays on Abbey Street, one on Annetwell Street, and an angled bay between on the corner. Behind is a three-storey two-bay extension. On the corner is a doorway flanked by shop windows, and on Abbey Street is a doorway with a stone surround. The windows are sashes in plain reveals.	II
19 and 21 Fisher Street; 54.89533°N 2.93665°W	—	Late 18th or early 19th century	Originally a house, later used as shops and an office, in brick on a chamfered plinth, with dressings in calciferous sandstone, quoins, and a Welsh slate roof. There are two storeys and four bays. On the front is an engaged Roman Doric porch that has an entablature with a paterae frieze and cornice. In the ground floor are shop bow windows, and in the upper floor the windows are sashes. At the rear is an extension with a bowed bay window.	II
Howard Arms public house and 103 and 105 Lowther Street; 54.89559°N 2.93389°W	—	Late 18th or early 19th century	Originally two houses, later two shops and a public house. They are stuccoed with a green slate roof, in two storeys, and with sash windows in the upper floor. The left house has been divided into two shops with three bays, and in the ground floor are paired doorways flanked by shop windows. The public house also has three bays, its ground floor is faced with coloured tiles. It contains a doorway and round-headed windows, all flanked by tile pilasters with leaf capitals. Below the windows is scrolled tile lettering.	II
11 Fisher Street; 54.89612°N 2.93786°W		c. 1800	Originally a house, later a club, it is in brick with light headers, and has quoins, an eaves cornice, a solid parapet, and a green slate roof. There are three storeys, three bays, a single-bay extension to the left, and a double-depth plan. The main part has a symmetrical serpentine front, a central Tuscan porch and a door with a fanlight. This is flanked by canted bay windows. In the upper floors are sash windows, those in the middle floor having three lights. The extension has a similar porch and sash windows.	II
Arnhem Block; 54.89770°N 2.94223°W	—	1804–05	The building, in the outer bailey of Carlisle Castle, originated as a master gunner's house, and was later a hospital, than an office. It is in brick on a chamfered plinth and has a gabled cornice in calciferous sandstone. There are two storeys and five bays. The doorway has an alternate-block surround and a false keystone, and the windows are sashes. In the roof are gabled dormers with decorative bargeboards.	II
Arroyo Block, Gym and Club; 54.89755°N 2.94278°W	—	1805	The block was extended in about 1908–12, and again in 1937–38. Originally an armoury, later barracks, it has since been used for various purposes. The block is built in brick on a red sandstone chamfered plinth, with quoins, a string course, and mouldings in calciferous sandstone, and a Welsh slate roof with dentilled eaves. There are two storeys, seven bays, and a four-bay extension on the left. The doorway and the sash windows are in stone architraves, and above the doorway is a painted panel.	II
St Anne's; 54.90655°N 2.95163°W	—	c. 1806	A house that was extended later in the century, it is rendered on a chamfered plinth, with a string course, an eaves cornice, a gabled pediment, and Welsh slate roofs. It has two storeys, a front of six bays, and rear extensions, giving an L-shaped plan. The doorway has a pilastered surround, the windows are sashes, and there are canted bay windows.	II
Old Vicarage; 54.90430°N 2.93556°W	—	1809	The former vicarage to St Michel's Church, later a private house, incorporates part of an 18th-century vicarage, and was extended to the rear in the 1890s. It is in brick on a chamfered plinth, with dressings of calciferous sandstone and a hipped green slate roof. There are two storeys, four bays, a single-depth plan, and rear extensions. On the front is an Ionic porch with a dentilled cornice, and a doorway with a fanlight. The windows are sashes in brick reveals with stone sills and flat brick arches.	II
Coledale Hall; 54.89492°N 2.96258°W		1810	Originally a house with a stable range, later a house and office, it is in brick with light headers on a chamfered plinth, with dressings in calciferous sandstone, quoins, a cornice, a parapet, and a green slate roof with coped gables. It has two storeys and three bays, with a single-storey single-bay gabled extension to the right, and a single-bay link wall to the left leading to a carriage entrance and the two-storey former stable range. The central doorway in the main block has a prostyle Ionic porch and a fanlight, and the windows are sashes. The right extension has a gabled porch with shaped bargeboards. At the rear are two bow windows.	II*
Crown Court, offices and gate arch 54.89173°N 2.93359°W		1810–17	The court replaces the west tower of the Citadel and was rebuilt by Robert Smirke. The tower is in sandstone on a chamfered plinth and has string courses, a machicolated cornice in parts, and battlemented parapets. Attached to the northwest of the tower is a two-storey, six-bay office block in Gothic style and a mock gate projection.	I
Durranhill House; 54.88902°N 2.89351°W	—	c. 1811	A house, later a convent, that was extended in the 1830s and later. It is in sandstone on a chamfered plinth, and has quoins, a cornice, and a parapet that is battlemented on the extension. The roof of the original part is in local slate, and the extension has a hipped roof in green slate. The building has two storeys, the original part has three bays, a two-bay extension to the left, and a seven-bay extension at the right at right angles forming an L-shaped plan. The main doorway has a prostyle Tuscan porch, flanked by two-storey bow windows, and with a bay window to the right. The windows are sashes and casements in stone architraves with hood moulds.	II
Eden Bridge; 54.90029°N 2.93628°W		1812–16	The bridge was designed by Robert Smirke, and carries the A7 road over the River Eden. It was widened in 1932 in the same style. The bridge is in calciferous sandstone and consists of five segmental aches on round piers, and has voussoirs, a string course, and a solid parapet. At the ends of the bridge are stone seats with wrought iron lanterns built into the parapet. Under the bridge are the remains of the earlier bridge of 1743.	I
Little Bank; 54.90469°N 2.93237°W	—	c. 1813	A house in brick with light headers on a chamfered plinth, with dressings of red sandstone and a hipped green slate roof. It has two storeys, three bays, flanking single-storey, three bay wings, and a double-depth plan. The central doorway is round-headed and has a stone surround with imposts and a fanlight. The windows are sashes, and in the right wing are garage doors.	II
32 Abbey Street and railings 54.89493°N 2.94094°W	—	c. 1817	The house, later an office, is in calciferous sandstone on a chamfered plinth, with quoins, an eaves cornice, and a green slate roof. There are two storeys with a basement, and five bays. Steps lead up to the central doorway, which has a pilastered surround with columns, a wreathed frieze, and a patterned fanlight. There is another doorway with a fanlight to the right, and the windows are sashes in plain stone reveals. Around the basement area are wavy speared railings, and over the steps to the main door is a scrolled lamp bracket overthrow.	II*
Hyssop Holme Well; 54.90228°N 2.94113°W	—	1817	A natural spring well, in sandstone, set into the side of a bank. It consists of a serpentine wall with a central recessed bowl, a cast iron pipe, and a dated keystone. Above it is chamfered coping, and steps lead down to a soak away.	II
Milestone; 54.92598°N 2.94599°W	—	1820–22 (probable)	The milestone was provided for the Carlisle to Glasgow turnpike. It is in sandstone, and consists of a stone with a rounded top containing a circular cast iron plate inscribed with the distance in miles to Carlisle.	II
1–9 The Crescent; 54.89214°N 2.93218°W		c. 1821–24	A terrace of nine houses, later shops and offices, forming a continuous crescent. They are in brick with quoins and a green slate roof. There are three storeys, and the buildings have two or three bays each. In the ground floor are shop fronts and two archways, and in the upper floors are sash windows in stone surrounds.	II
20–28 Scotch Street and 1 West Tower Street; 54.89617°N 2.93566°W	—	1820s	Originally houses on a corner site, later three shops, in brick with light headers, with dressings in calciferous sandstone, string courses, a cornice, and a green slate roof. There are three storeys, five bays on Scotch Street, four on West Tower Street, a rounded bay on the corner, and a double-depth plan. In the ground floor are late 20th-century shop fronts, and above are sash windows in stone architraves. On the West Tower Street front is a flat-headed through archway.	II
26, 28, and 30 Castle Street and railings 54.89549°N 2.93974°W		1823	A row of three houses, later used for other purposes, in calciferous sandstone, with a rusticated ground floor, string courses, a modillioned eaves cornice, and a green slate roof. They have three storeys with cellars, three bays each, and a double-depth plan. Each house has steps leading up to a prostyle Ionic porch with unfluted columns, and above the door is a fanlight decorated with a Greek key pattern. The windows are sashes, those in the middle floor in stone architraves with cornices and panelled aprons, and the windows over the doorways have console brackets. The cellar void is surrounded by railings.	II*
2–9 Chapel Street; 54.89548°N 2.93254°W	—	1824	A terrace of eight houses, one used later as a shop and another as an office, in brick with light headers on a chamfered plinth, with quoins at the right end. They have two storeys and two or three bays. The round-headed doorways have pilastered surrounds and patterned radial fanlights. The windows are sashes, and in the centre of the terrace is a segment-headed carriage arch.	II
Gaol wall 54.89149°N 2.93462°W	—	1824–27	The wall surrounding the gaol yard is in red sandstone with rounded coping, and is in some parts up to its original height of almost 10 metres (33 ft). It includes a blocked archway and a pair of square gate piers.	II
Hospital Wing of County Gaol and Gaol Wall; 54.89204°N 2.93389°W	—	1824–27	The hospital wing of the gaol and the gaol wall are in sandstone. The wall has a solid parapet, battlemented on the side of English Street, and a flat lead roof. It has two storeys and numerous bays. The gaol wall is on a chamfered plinth and contains blind lancet windows. The hospital wing is built against the rear of the wall.	II
Gates and lamp bracket overthrow 54.89382°N 2.93710°W	—	c. 1825	The gates and the overthrow supporting a lamp are at the entrance to the graveyard of St Cuthbert's Church. They are in wrought iron and consist of double gates in a supporting frame under an overthrow. The lamp dates from the 20th century.	II
18, 20 and 22 Abbey Street; 54.89515°N 2.94159°W	—	Early 19th century	Originally a house and a shop, later used for other purposes. They are in brick with slate roofs, and both buildings have two bays, and sash windows in the upper floors. The former house to the right is in three storeys, and has a shop front in the ground floor. The former shop has a chamfered plinth, two storeys, and a central doorway flanked by shop doors and windows.	II
24 Abbey Street; 54.89511°N 2.94142°W	—	Early 19th century	A house in calciferous sandstone ashlar on a plinth of red sandstone, with a string course, an eaves cornice, and a tile roof. There are two storeys with a cellar, and two bays. Steps lead up to the round-headed doorway that has a radial fanlight and a fluted pilastered surround with false imposts and keystone. The windows are sashes in stone architraves. Railings surround the cellar area, and steps lead down to the cellar. To the right is a through passage and a projecting rendered brick wall.	II*
36 and 38 Abbey Street; 54.89483°N 2.94062°W	—	Early 19th century	Originally a house, later an office, it is in calciferous sandstone on a chamfered plinth with a brick return, and it has a bracketed cornice and a slate roof. There are two bays, 3 1/2 storeys, and it has a double-depth plan. The doorway and sash windows are in architraves, and above the door is a fanlight.	II
13 and 15 English Street; 54.89422°N 2.93523°W	—	Early 19th century	Originally a house, later a shop with offices above, in stuccoed brick with stone dressings, quoins, and a Welsh slate roof. There are three storeys and three bays. In the ground floor is a shop window and on the right is a quoined carriage arch leading into Kings Arms Lane. The upper floors contain sash windows in architraves. In Kings Arms Lane is a doorway with a radial fanlight, and a pilastered surround with imposts and a false keystone.	II
1 Fisher Street; 54.89643°N 2.93881°W	—	Early 19th century	A house, then offices, in brick with light headers on a chamfered plinth and with a slate roof. There are three storeys, three bays, and a lower two-storey two-bay extension at the rear. Steps lead up to a round-headed doorway with a stone surround and a radial fanlight. The windows are sashes with stone sills, and mainly with flat brick arches; the window to the right of the doorway is smaller and has a round head.	II
3 and 5 Fisher Street; 54.89637°N 2.93864°W	—	Early 19th century	A pair of houses, later used as offices, in brick on a chamfered stone plinth, with a string course, a metal gutter on stone brackets, and a slate roof. There are two storeys, and a double-depth plan. No. 3 has two bays, and No. 5 has three. The doorways have stone surrounds, fanlights and cornices, and the windows are sashes in stone architraves.	II
4, 6 and 8 Fisher Street; 54.89630°N 2.93899°W	—	Early 19th century	A row of three houses, later used for other purposes, in brick with light headers on a chamfered plinth, with a slate roof containing gabled dormers. They have three storeys with basements, and each house has three bays. Steps lead up to the doorways that have fanlights. The windows are sashes, and there are railings around the basement areas.	II
20 Fisher Street; 54.89585°N 2.93787°W	—	Early 19th century	A house, later used as a club, in brick on a chamfered plinth, with a green slate roof. It has two storeys, four bays, and a double-depth plan. The doorway has a fanlight, and an Ionic porch that has a frieze with wreathes. The windows are sashes.	II
22 Fisher Street; 54.89572°N 2.93778°W	—	Early 19th century	A house, later used for other purposes, in brick on a chamfered sandstone plinth, with a tiled roof. There are two storeys, a double-depth plan, and a symmetrical front of five bays. In the centre, steps lead up to a prostyle Ionic porch with a wreathed frieze. To the right is a round-headed doorway to a through passage, with a radial fanlight. The windows are sashes with sandstone sills, and in the roof there are gabled dormers.	II
34 Fisher Street; 54.89536°N 2.93708°W	—	Early 19th century	A shop on a corner site, mainly in sandstone, in three storeys, with three bays on Fisher Street, and four bays on St Mary's Gate. The ground floor is rusticated, and contains round-headed sash windows with voussoirs. On the Fisher Street front, in the upper floors, are fluted Ionic pilasters and a cornice. At the right is a prostyle Greek Doric porch with a triglyph frieze. On the St Mary's Gate front the upper floors are in brick. The windows in the upper floors are sashes with flat heads.	II
2 Greenmarket; 54.89474°N 2.93662°W	—	Early 19th century	A house, then a shop, stuccoed, with pilasters, string courses, an eaves cornice, and a Welsh slate roof. There are three storeys, two bays, a door and shop windows in the ground floor, and sash windows in stone architraves above.	II
6 Paternoster Row; 54.89513°N 2.93944°W	—	Early 19th century	Originally a house, later an office and shop, it is in brick with a Welsh slate roof. There are three storeys, two bays, and a double-depth plan. In the ground floor is a 20th-century shop front and a through passage. The windows in the middle floor are sashes with flat brick arches, and in the top floor they are casements.	II
17 Scotch Street; 54.89617°N 2.93527°W	—	Early 19th century	A house, later a shop, in brick with light headers on a chamfered plinth, with stone dressings, quoins, a bracketed cornice, and a hipped green slate roof. There are three storeys, one bay, and a double-depth plan. In the ground floor are a shop door and window, in the middle floor is a three-light window, and in the top floor is a Venetian window. There are two sash windows on the left return.	II
34 Scotch Street; 54.89586°N 2.93568°W	—	Early 19th century	A house in calciferous sandstone with an eaves cornice and a slate roof. There are three storeys and two bays. In the ground floor are shop windows, and above are sash windows in stone surrounds.	II
46 and 48 Scotch Street; 54.89559°N 2.93565°W	—	Early 19th century	Originally two houses, later two shops, in calciferous sandstone with a string course, an eaves cornice, and a slate roof. There are three storeys, five bays, and a double-depth plan. In the ground floor are 20th-century shop doors and windows, and above are sash windows in plain stone reveals.	II
38 St Nicholas Street; 54.88752°N 2.92638°W	—	Early 19th century	A brick house on a chamfered plinth, with stone dressings, quoins, a string course, and a green slate roof. There are two storeys, three bays, and a double-depth plan. The central doorway has a stone architrave, a hood on consoles, and a fanlight, and the windows are sashes in stone architraves.	II
43 West Walls; 54.89484°N 2.94161°W	—	Early 19th century	A brick house with a Welsh slate roof, in two storeys and three bays. The central round-headed doorway has a pilastered surround with false imposts and keystone, and a radial fanlight. The windows are sashes.	II
32 and 34 Wood Street; 54.89232°N 2.90027°W	—	Early 19th century	A pair of houses at the end of a row, in brick on a chamfered plinth, with stone dressings and a roof in local slate. They have two storeys and three bays each. Each house has a central round-headed doorway with a pilastered surround. The doorway surround of No. 34 is fluted with imposts and a keystone, and it also has a fanlight. The windows are sashes.	II
Abbey Court; 54.89487°N 2.94000°W	—	Early 19th century	Originally two houses, later one shop, it is in brick with light headers, it has dressings in calciferous sandstone, and a Welsh slate roof. The shop is in two storeys and three bays. There are two doorways, each with a fanlight, and a surround with imposts and a keystone. In the ground floor are two shop windows with hood moulds, and above are sash windows.	II
Ashleigh House, railings and garage 54.89217°N 2.90088°W	—	Early 19th century	Originally a house and a cottage, the cottage later converted into a garage. It is stuccoed on a chamfered plinth, with stone dressings, a brick rear wall, quoins, and a slate roof. There are two storeys and two bays, with a lower two-storey single-bay wing to the right. The doorway has pilasters and a fanlight, and the windows are sashes in stone surrounds. In front of the house is a low wall, speared railings and a gate.	II
Boundary stone 54.87360°N 2.90120°W	—	Early 19th century	The boundary stone marks the boundary between two parishes or townships. It is in red sandstone and consists of a square stone with a rounded top set at an angle. Inscribed on one face is "H" (for Harraby) and on the other "C" on the south (for Carleton).	II
Bramerton Lodge and railings 54.89227°N 2.90049°W	—	Early 19th century	A brick house on a chamfered plinth, with stone dressings, quoins, an eaves cornice, and a green slate roof with coped gables. There are two storeys and three bays. The doorway has a chamfered surround, a fanlight, and a bracketed hood, and the windows are sashes. In front of the house is a low wall with speared railings.	II
The Caledonian Public House; 54.89155°N 2.93189°W		Early 19th century	The public house is stuccoed on a chamfered plinth, and has a stone-bracketed metal gutter and a green slate roof. There are three storeys and five bays. In the ground floor is a 20th-century doorway and casement windows, and the upper floors contain sash windows in stone architraves.	II
Church House; 54.89348°N 2.93801°W	—	Early 19th century	Originally a vicarage, later an office, it is in brick with light headers, stuccoed on the West Walls face, the lower floor is rusticated, and it has a hipped green slate roof. There are two storeys, and three bays on the front and left return. The doorway is in the left return, and has a stone surround, a fanlight. and sidelights. The windows are sashes.	II
Currock House Community Centre; 54.87924°N 2.93667°W		Early 19th century	Originally a house, later a community centre, it is in calciferous sandstone on a chamfered plinth, and has a string course, a cornice, a parapet, and a hipped green slate roof. There are two storeys, a symmetrical front of three bays, two bays on the sides, and a lower two-storey two-bay range at the rear. The projecting porch is pilastered, and above the door is a fanlight. The windows are sashes, and in the right return are two canted bay windows.	II
Golden Lion public house 54.88883°N 2.92715°W		Early 19th century	Originally three houses on a corner site, later a public house, it was extended in 1879 and 1897. The building is stuccoed on a chamfered plinth, with angle pilasters, a string course, an eaves cornice, and a local slate roof. There are two storeys, four bays on the front, and five on the right return. On the front are paired doorways with a pilastered surround between which is an engaged column. There are other doorways on the corner and in the right return. The doorways on the front are flanked by bay windows containing casements, and in the upper floor are sash windows.	II
Milestone; 54.87416°N 2.90202°W	—	Early 19th century	The milestone was provided for the Carlisle to Eamont Bridge turnpike. It consists of a square stone with a roughly rounded top set at an angle to the road. On each face is a cast iron plate inscribed with a number indicating the distance in miles to Carlisle and to Penrith.	II
Milestone; 54.87913°N 2.97228°W	—	Early 19th century	The milestone was provided for the Carlisle to Cockermouth turnpike. It is in red sandstone, and has a rounded top and a curved face. On the face is a rectangular metal plate inscribed with the distances in miles to Carlisle, Wigton and Cockermouth.	II
Morton Community Centre; 54.88568°N 2.96421°W		Early 19th century	Originally a house, later used for other purposes, it is rendered on a chamfered plinth, with dressings in calciferous sandstone, quoins, a dentilled eaves cornice, and a hipped green slate roof. There are two storeys, a main range of five bays and a rear wing of six bays, giving an L-shaped plan. On the entrance front is a projecting Ionic porch with engaged columns and a doorway with a stone architrave and a dentilled broken segmental pediment. In the garden front is a doorway with an Ionic surround and bay windows, some canted and some squared. The other windows are sashes in stone architraves.	II
Stanwix House; 54.90519°N 2.93457°W	—	Early 19th century	A brick house with light headers on a chamfered plinth, with dressings in calciferous sandstone, quoins, a string course, and a hipped green slate roof with some 20th-century tiles. It has two storeys, a double-depth plan, a symmetrical front of five bays, and a lower three-bay extension to the right. The central doorway has a prostyle Doric porch and a radial fanlight. Flanking it are wooden canted bay windows, and the other windows are sashes. On the right return is a stair projection.	II
Gateway, wall and lamp brackets south entrance Stanwix House; 54.90450°N 2.93324°W	—	Early 19th century	The wall and gate bays are in sandstone. There are four octagonal piers with recessed panels flanking the entrances. Quadrant walls link these to square end piers that carry fluted cast iron columns and lamp brackets. On the walls are speared railings; these and the gates are in cast iron.	II
Gates, Old Stanwix Vicarage; 54.90419°N 2.93649°W	—	Early 19th century	Flanking the gateway to the former vicarage are octagonal gate piers in sandstone with shaped caps. Between them are double speared cast iron gates, and above the gates is a wrought iron overthrow that forms a flattened scrolled arch.	II
St Nicholas Arms Public House; 54.88814°N 2.92463°W		Early 19th century	The public house is in brick on a chamfered plinth, with dressings in calciferous sandstone, quoins, an eaves cornice, and a green slate roof. It has two storeys, four bays, and a double-depth plan. Steps lead up to a prostyle Ionic porch and a doorway with a fanlight. To the right is a squared bay window, and the other windows are sashes in stone architraves, some with panelled aprons.	II
The Grange and railings, Stable Croft and barn 54.89205°N 2.90181°W	—	Early 19th century	Originally a house with a stable that was converted into a house, and a barn. They are stuccoed on a chamfered plinth, with stone dressings and a slate roof. The house has two storeys and four bays, the former stable has two storeys and two bays, and the barn has a single storey. The house has a doorway with a Tuscan doorcase and a fanlight, flanked by canted bay windows. The windows are a mix of casements and sashes, and in the barn is a large segmental arch. In front of the house is a low wall and speared railings.	II
Theakston's Carlisle Brewery; 54.89562°N 2.94451°W		Early 19th century	The brewery was extended later in the 19th century, but closed in the late 20th century. It was partly demolished, and the remaining building converted into student residences. The building is in brick with roofs of Welsh and Lakeland slate. There are five parallel three-storey ranges, with gables facing the river. Behind them is a four-storey tower with a pyramidal roof containing a dormer on each side, and a square tapering chimney stack. The windows in the ranges have segmental heads and stone sills.	II
Inner Bailey: Magazine; 54.89739°N 2.94118°W		1827	The magazine is in the inner bailey of Carlisle Castle. It is in sandstone on a chamfered plinth, and has a green slate roof. There is one storey and one bay. In the left return is a door in a plain surround. On the front and each side is a sash window in a stone surround flanked by ventilation slits under hood moulds. Inside there is a parabolic brick vault.	II
Crozier Lodge, Cumberland Infirmary; 54.89604°N 2.95776°W		Late 1820s	The former house is in calciferous sandstone ashlar on a chamfered plinth, with a string course, a cornice, a solid parapet, and a mansard green slate roof. It has two storeys, a central block of three bays, and lower flanking single-bay wings. The central doorway is flanked by engaged columns and has a radial fanlight with a pilastered surround and an open pediment. The windows in the central block are sashes, and in the roof are three boxed casement dormers. The wings contain Venetian windows in each floor.	II
Gallipoli Block, Carlisle Castle; 54.89743°N 2.94322°W	—	1829	The block is in brick with a Welsh slate roof. It was built as a canteen, originally in one storey and six bays, extended in 1876 to two storeys and eleven bays, and used as offices. There are two round-headed porches. The windows are sashes with brick reveals and stone sills and lintels. In the centre is a painted stone panel, and on the sides are external stone steps leading to an upper floor doorway.	II
Petteril Bank; 54.87404°N 2.91162°W	—	1829	A house that was extended in the late 19th century and later used for other purposes. It is in calciferous sandstone on a chamfered plinth, with a string course, a cornice, a solid parapet, and green slate roofs. The original part has two storeys, an entrance front of two bays and a garden front of four bays, and the extension, forming an L-shaped plan, has three storeys and four bays. The entrance front has double doors in a pointed chamfered surround, and casement windows. On the garden front is a two-storey canted bay window and a French window. The extension contains mullioned windows and a bay window.	II*
30–40 Lowther Street, 1 Lonsdale Street and railings 54.89420°N 2.93311°W	—	Late 1820s or 1830s	Originally a terrace of seven houses, later shops and offices, in brick on a chamfered plinth, with dressings in calciferous sandstone, quoins, a string course, an eaves cornice, and a green slate roof, hipped on the corner. There are three storeys with basements, a double-depth plan, and each house has two bays. The central three houses have Tuscan doorcases with wreathed friezes, and No. 30 Lowther Street has an angled entrance with a coat of arms above. In the upper floor some windows are sashes and others are casements, all in stone architraves. In front of the basement areas are iron railings.	II
The Lodge; 54.88038°N 2.91191°W		1830	Built as a toll cottage for the Carlisle to Eamont Bridge turnpike, later a lodge, and subsequently a private house, it is in rendered calciferous sandstone on a squared plinth, and it has a hipped green slate roof. There is one storey and two bays on each front. The doorway is in a chamfered pointed arch, and the casement windows are in chamfered surrounds and have hood moulds.	II
Cumberland Infirmary; 54.89567°N 2.95528°W		1830–32	The hospital, designed by Richard Tattersall, is in ashlar on a chamfered plinth, and has a rusticated ground floor, string courses, angle pilasters, a solid parapet with finials, and a green slate roof. It has three storeys and eleven bays, the outer bays projecting forward. In the central three bays is a Greek Doric portico with four columns and a frieze decorated with wreathes. The windows are sashes.	II*
1–9 Devonshire Terrace; 54.90231°N 2.93765°W	—	1832	A terrace of nine houses, some added later, in brick with light headers on a chamfered stone plinth, with dressings in calciferous sandstone, quoins on the ends, string courses, an eaves cornice, and a stepped green slate roof, hipped at the ends. There are three storeys, each house has two or three bays, with three bays on Cavendish Terrace, and three on St George's Crescent. The doorways have prostyle Ionic porches and fanlights. The windows are sashes in stone architraves, some of which have been replaced by canted or squared bay windows. The houses have segmental carriage arches, two houses have dormers, and there is a tetrastyle porch on the left return.	II
Cavendish House; 54.89382°N 2.92831°W		1832	A brick house with light headers on a chamfered plinth, with dressings in calciferous sandstone, quoins, an eaves cornice and a green slate roof with coped gables. It has two storeys and basements, three bays, and a double-depth plan. The central doorway is approached up steps, and has a prostyle Ionic porch and a fanlight. The windows are sashes in stone architraves, and in the basement are casement windows.	II
Diocesan Church Centre; 54.89357°N 2.93828°W		1832	Originally a grammar school, later extended, it closed in 1883 and the building has since been used for other purposes. It is built in sandstone and has a Welsh slate roof, partly hipped. At first the school had one bay, another bay was added later, then four more bays. The windows are mullioned.	II
Garrison Cells and Custodian's Office; 54.89680°N 2.94216°W	—	1832	The buildings are in the outer bailey of Carlisle Castle. They are in red sandstone on a chamfered sandstone plinth and have green slate roofs and are in a single storey. The oldest part are the cells on the left, which have two bays and a lean-to roof. The rest was built in 1840, the central cells having three bays and a gabled roof. To the right are an office and shed in eight bays and with a lean-to roof. The cells have barred windows, and in the office and shed are sash windows.	II
St Cuthbert's Vicarage and railings 54.89337°N 2.93787°W	—	1832	Originally two vicarages, later combined into one. The building is in rendered brick, with a string course and a green slate roof. There are two storeys with a basement, and five bays. The door has a fanlight with a pilastered surround, and most of the windows are sashes. Around the basement area are speared railings.	II
Liberal Club; 54.89332°N 2.93340°W		Early 1830s	A house, later a club, with a front of calciferous sandstone, the other walls in brick, on a chamfered plinth, with a cornice, a solid parapet, and a green slate roof. It has two storeys, three bays, and a double-depth plan. Steps lead up to the central round-headed doorway with columns and a radial fanlight. Above it is a sash window in an architrave and with a bowed cast iron balcony. These are flanked by two-storey bow windows.	II
1–13 Devonshire Street and 29 Lowther Street; 54.89309°N 2.93368°W	—	1830s	A terrace of seven houses, later used for other purposes, in calciferous sandstone, with a string course, an eaves cornice, and a slate roof. They have three storeys, two or three bays, and a double-depth plan. No. 29 Lowther Street has two bays on Devonshire Street and two on Lowther Street. In the ground floor are shop doors and windows, and above are sash windows in stone reveals.	II
1 Earl Street; 54.89307°N 2.93166°W	—	1830s	A house in brick with light headers on a chamfered plinth, with stone dressings, a string course, and a green slate roof. There are two storeys and two bays. The doorway has a stone surround with false imposts and keystone, and a fanlight. To the right is a doorway leading to a through passage, and the windows are sashes.	II
9 Earl Street; 54.89325°N 2.93180°W	—	1830s	A house in brick with light headers, a cornice band, and a slate roof. It has two storeys, two bays, a doorway with a stone surround and a fanlight, and sash windows.	II
11 Earl Street; 54.89329°N 2.93182°W	—	1830s	A stuccoed house on a chamfered plinth in a terrace, with a slate roof. It has two storeys, two bays, a round-headed doorway with a moulded surround and a fanlight, sash windows in stone architraves, and a gabled dormer.	II
2 Etterby Close; 54.90733°N 2.95191°W	—	1830s	A sandstone house on a chamfered plinth, with quoins, and a slate roof with coped gables. It has two storeys, three bays, and a double-depth plan. The door has a pilastered surround and a radial fanlight, and the windows are sashes in stone surrounds. At the left is a stable extension.	II
10 Etterby Street; 54.90520°N 2.93803°W	—	1830s	The house is rendered on a chamfered plinth, with angle pilasters, a bracketed eaves course, and a Welsh slate roof. There are two storeys and two bays. Steps lead up to a central doorway with a pilastered surround, a fanlight, and a cornice with a keystone. The windows are casements in stuccoed surrounds. Above the doorway is a decorative embossed stucco circle flanked by diamonds.	II
12 Etterby Street; 54.90523°N 2.93816°W	—	1830s	A detached house, stuccoed on a chamfered plinth, with a Welsh slate roof. It has two storeys, three bays, and a double-depth plan. On the left is a doorway with a pilastered surround, a fanlight, a false keystone, and imposts. To the right is a doorway to a through passage, between is a canted bay window, and in the upper floor are casement windows.	II
14 and 16 Etterby Street; 54.90529°N 2.93835°W	—	1830s	A pair of houses in a terrace, stuccoed on a chamfered plinth. No. 14 has a green slate roof, and No. 16 has a roof of Welsh slate. They have two storeys and each house has two bays. In the centre is a segmental-headed carriage entrance, flanked by round-headed doorways with pilastered surrounds, false keystones, imposts, and fanlights. In the ground floor are canted bay windows, and above are sash windows.	II
18 and 20 Etterby Street; 54.90535°N 2.93857°W	—	1830s	A mirrored pair of houses in a terrace, they are stuccoed on a chamfered plinth, and have a Welsh slate roof. The houses have two storeys and two bays each. Steps lead up to the doorways that have stone surrounds and fanlights, and between them is a segmental-arched carriage entrance with a rusticated surround. The windows are sashes with plain reveals and stone sills.	II
22 and 24 Etterby Street; 54.90540°N 2.93875°W	—	1830s	Originally one house, later divided into two, it is roughcast on a chamfered plinth, and has a green slate roof. There are two storeys and three bays. Steps lead up to the original doorway that has a pilastered surround with a false keystone and imposts, and a fanlight. To the right are two doorways with plain reveals, one leading to the house and the other to a through passage. The windows are 20th-century casements.	II
26–36 Etterby Street; 54.90547°N 2.93909°W	—	1830s	A row of six houses in a terrace, they are in brick with light headers, mostly stuccoed, on a chamfered plinth, with roofs of green or Welsh slate. The houses have two storeys, and each has two bays. Steps lead up to round-headed doorways with pilastered surrounds, false keystones and imposts, and fanlights, and there are doorways to through-passages. The windows are of various types, and there is a projecting inserted shop window.	II
38, 40 and 42 Etterby Street; 54.90562°N 2.93981°W	—	1830s	A row of three houses in a terrace, in brick with light headers, Nos. 38 and 40 being stuccoed, they are on a chamfered plinth, and have a green slate roof. There are two storeys and each house has two bays. Steps lead up to round-headed doorways with stone surrounds and radial fanlights, and there are doorways leading to through passages. The windows are sashes.	II
44–50 Etterby Street; 54.90564°N 2.93997°W	—	1830s	A terrace of four houses in brick with light heads, the middle two houses being stuccoed, on a chamfered plinth and with a Welsh slate roof. They have two storeys and each house has two bays. The doorways, which include three leading to through-passages, are round-headed with pilastered surrounds, and false imposts and keystones; the house doors also have fanlights. The windows are sashes.	II
54–60 Etterby Street; 54.90574°N 2.94050°W	—	1830s	A row of four houses in a terrace, mostly in brick with light headers and a green slate roof; No. 54 is stuccoed and has a Welsh slate roof. They have two storeys and two bays each. The doorways, including those to through passages, are pilastered with false keystones and imposts; the house doors have radial fanlights. The windows are sashes, some double, and they have stone architraves.	II
60–70 Etterby Street; 54.90581°N 2.94088°W	—	1830s	A row of five houses in a terrace, in brick with light headers, two of which are roughcast, on a chamfered plinth, with Welsh slate roofs. They have two storeys and two bays each. The doorways are round-headed, with pilastered surrounds, false imposts and keystones, and fanlights, and there are two through-passage doorways. The windows are sashes, most in stone architraves.	II
24 and 26 Lowther Street and railings 54.89379°N 2.93297°W	—	1830s	A pair of houses, later used for other purposes, they are in calciferous sandstone, rusticated in the ground floor, with a string course, an eaves cornice, an open balustraded parapet, and a slate roof. There are three storeys with basements, a double-depth plan, and each part has three bays. They have Roman Doric prostyle porches with false open parapets, and above the doors are fanlights. The windows are sashes; those in the middle floor have stone architraves, cornices, and pierced aprons, and in the top floor they have eared architraves. In front of the basement areas are patterned cast iron railings.	II
11–29 Warwick Road; 54.89292°N 2.93198°W	—	1830s	Originally a terrace of seven houses and a public house, later nine shops. They are stuccoed or rendered, some have quoins and stone-bracketed metal gutters, and they have green slate roofs, hipped at the ends. The middle three shops have three storeys, the other have two, and each shop has two bays. No, 11, the former public house, has a return of seven bays, and No. 29 has a return of two bays. In the ground floor are shop fronts, and above are sash windows.	II
63–69 Warwick Road; 54.89357°N 2.92929°W	—	1830s	Four houses in a terrace, they are in brick with light headers on a chamfered plinth, and have stone dressings and roofs of Welsh or green slate. They have two storeys, and two bays each. The doorway of No. 69 has a stone surround, and a round-arched brick head, and the other houses have pilastered surrounds; all have fanlights. In the ground floor are canted bay windows, and above the windows are sashes, those in Nos. 63 and 65 with brick surrounds, and those in Nos. 67 and 69 in stone architraves.	II
85–93 Warwick Road; 54.89391°N 2.92790°W	—	1830s	Five houses in a terrace in brick, some with light headers, on a chamfered plinth, with stone dressings, a cornice, and a green slate roof. They have two storeys, and each house has two bays. The doorways are round-headed with fanlights, those of Nos. 85 and 87 have patterned fanlights that have pilastered surrounds with imposts and false keystones. Most of the windows are 20th-century casements, some in stone architraves.	II
21, 23 and 25 English Street; 54.89400°N 2.93516°W	—	Early to mid 19th century	Two shops in calciferous sandstone with a string course, a cornice, a parapet, and a green slate roof with a coped gable on the right. They have three storeys, No. 21 at the left has two bays, partly over Pack Horse Lane, and Nos. 23 and 25 are combined with three bays. In the ground floor are 20th-century shop doors and windows, and in the upper floors there are varied windows, including an oriel window.	II
Mayfield and railings 54.89198°N 2.90216°W	—	Early or mid 19th century	A stuccoed house on a chamfered plinth with stone dressings, a stone-bracketed metal gutter, and a roof of local slate. It has two storeys and three bays. The central doorway has a pilastered surround, a dentilled cornice, and a fanlight, and the windows are sashes. In front of the house is a low wall with speared railings.	II
Tollund House; 54.89526°N 2.94205°W	—	Early to mid 19th century	A house, later offices, in brick with light headers on a chamfered stone plinth, with an eaves cornice in calciferous sandstone, and a tile roof. There are three storeys with a cellar, and two bays. The doorway has a stone surround, and is approached by right-angle steps with twisted cast iron balusters. The windows are sashes in brick reveals with stone sills and flat brick arches.	II
Shaddon Mill; 54.89175°N 2.94433°W		1835–36	A former cotton mill, later converted into industrial units, it is in sandstone on a chamfered plinth, with quoins, an eaves band, a parapet, and a green slate roof. The main block has seven storeys, 22 bays (225 feet (69 m) long), and five bays in the returns. It contains casement windows with hood cornices. At the left is a lower single-bay engine house with a dentilled cornice, and a two-storey seven-bay boiler house with Diocletian windows at the rear.	II*
Dixon's Chimney, Shaddon Mill; 54.89186°N 2.94535°W		1836	The chimney is in brick with sandstone quoins, and consists of an octagonal tapering shaft. The chimney was originally over 100 metres (330 ft) high, but was reduced to about 83 metres (272 ft) in 1931 following damage by lightning.	II*
Ypres Block, Carlisle Castle; 54.89706°N 2.94300°W		1836–37	A barrack block in the outer bailey of the castle, it is in brick with a stone cornice and a hipped green slate roof. There are three storeys with a basement and 15 bays. Two bridges over the basement area lead to porches and doorways with stone surrounds and fanlights. The windows are sashes in brick reveals and with stone sills and lintels. In the centre is a painted panel.	II
Railway Inn; 54.88615°N 2.92134°W		1837	A public house in sandstone on a squared plinth with angle pilasters, a string course, a cornice, a solid parapet, and a green slate roof with coped gables. It has two storeys, five bays, and a double-depth plan. Steps lead up to a central doorway with a pilastered surround and a fanlight, and the windows are sashes.	II
37 and 39 Lowther Street, overthrow and lamp bracket 54.89361°N 2.93359°W	—	Late 1830s	A pair of houses, later used for other purposes, in calciferous sandstone on a chamfered plinth in red sandstone, with a cornice, a solid parapet, and a green slate roof. They have two storeys, and each house has four bays. The doorways are approached by steps, and are flanked by columns, and the windows are sashes. In the roof are dormers, some gabled and some hipped. In front of No. 37 is a scrolled wrought iron overthrow and a lamp bracket.	II
38–48 Scotland Road; 54.90611°N 2.93701°W	—	Late 1830s	A terrace of six houses in brick with light headers on a chamfered plinth, with dressings of calciferous sandstone, and with Welsh slate roofs. They have two storeys and each house has two bays. The doorways have stone surrounds with false imposts and keystones, and some have radial fanlights. Between some of the houses are through passages, and there is one larger carriage entrance. The windows are sashes in stone architraves, and two houses have canted bay windows.	II
1 Victoria Place; 54.89496°N 2.93289°W	—	Late 1830s	A house, later an office, in calciferous sandstone on a moulded plinth, with a return wall in brick, it has a string course, a cornice, a parapet with a central decorative panel, and a green slate roof with coped gables. There are two storeys with cellars, a symmetrical front of five bays, and a double-depth plan. In the centre, steps lead up to a prostyle Ionic porch and a door with a fanlight. The windows are sashes, most with recessed aprons. The window above the doorway is larger, it is in an architrave, and has a cornice on consoles.	II*
2 Victoria Place; 54.89522°N 2.93297°W	—	Late 1830s	Originally a house, later used as an office, in calciferous sandstone on a moulded plinth, with a return wall in brick, it has a string course, a cornice, a parapet with a central decorative panel, and a green slate roof with coped gables. There are two storeys with cellars, and a symmetrical front of five bays. In the centre is a prostyle Ionic porch and a door with a fanlight. The windows are sashes, most with recessed aprons. The window above the doorway is in an architrave, and has a cornice on consoles.	II*
73 Warwick Road; 54.89366°N 2.92878°W	—	Late 1830s	Originally a house, later a surgery, it is in brick on a chamfered plinth, with stone dressings, an eaves cornice, and a green slate roof. There are two storeys and three bays. The doorway is flanked by columns, and it has a patterned fanlight. To the right of the doorway is a squared bay window, and the other windows are sashes in architraves.	II
75–81 Warwick Road; 54.89376°N 2.92857°W	—	Late 1830s	A terrace of four houses in brick with light headers on a chamfered plinth, with stone dressings, a cornice, and a green slate roof. There are two storeys, and each house has two bays. The doorways are round-headed with fanlights of different designs. No. 75 has a three-light window in the ground floor, No. 77 has a canted bay window, and all the other windows are sashes in stone architraves. Some houses have boxed dormers.	II
Lloyd's Bank and railings 54.89315°N 2.93286°W		1839–40	Originally a club, later used as a bank, it is in calciferous sandstone on a chamfered plinth, and has giant pilasters with Corinthian capitals, a moulded entablature, a modillioned cornice, a parapet that is partly balustraded with a central festoon, and a slate roof. There are two storeys and five bays. The outer bays are recessed and contain doorways, each with a fanlight and a bracketed cornice. The windows are sashes, those in the central three bays of the ground floor with console-bracketed cornices. In front of the bank is a low wall with railings.	II*
Turf Inn; 54.89929°N 2.93241°W		1839–40	This was built as a grandstand hotel for a racecourse, it was extended in 1874, and has been a public house and restaurant. The building is in calciferous sandstone on a chamfered plinth, and has angle pilasters, string courses, a cornice and a slate roof. The main block has three storeys and five bays, and has a stepped top with cast iron parapet railings. There is a central doorway with pilasters, a cornice, and a fanlight. The windows are sashes in stone surrounds. The extension to the left has two storeys and five bays, and contains a wooden porch and casement windows.	II
3, 5 and 7 Earl Street; 54.89317°N 2.93174°W	—	1830s or 1840s	Originally two houses, later combined into one office, the building is in sandstone on a chamfered plinth, with a string course, an eaves cornice, and a green slate roof. There are two storeys and four bays. The doorways have pilastered surrounds, a modillioned entablature, a cornice, and fanlights. In the ground floor are bowed casement windows, and in the upper floor the windows are sashes.	II
52 Etterby Street; 54.90566°N 2.94014°W	—	1830s or 1840s	A terraced house, stuccoed on a chamfered plinth with a green slate roof. There are two storeys and two bays. Steps lead up to the doorway that has a fanlight and an Ionic doorcase, and the windows are sashes in architraves. To the right is a through-passage doorway.	II
4, 6 and 6A Lowther Street; 54.89284°N 2.93283°W	—	1830s or 1840s	Originally a house, later two shops, they are in brick with pale headers, dressings in calciferous sandstone, an eaves cornice, and a green slate roof. There are three storeys and three bays. In the ground floor is a central entrance flanked by shop fronts, and above are sash windows in architraves.	II
35–43 Victoria Road; 54.89346°N 2.90377°W	—	1830s or 1840s	A terrace of five brick houses, some with light headers, others rendered, on a chamfered plinth, with stone dressings and a Welsh slate roof that has a coped gable at the left. They have two storeys, two bays each, and a double-depth plan. The round-headed doorways have stone surrounds and radial fanlights, and the windows, which are sashes, have brick reveals, stone sills and flat brick arches.	II
99, 101 and 103 Warwick Road; 54.89406°N 2.92720°W	—	1830s or 1840s	Three houses in a terrace, in brick with light headers on a chamfered stone plinth, with stone dressings, a cornice, and a green slate roof. They have two storeys, two bays each, and a double-depth plan. Steps lead up to round-headed doorways with stone surrounds and fanlights; there is a similar though-passage doorway to the left in No. 99. No, 99 also has a single-storey canted bay window, and No. 101 has a similar two-storey bay window. The other windows are a mix of sashes and casements.	II
City boundary stone 54.89887°N 2.93862°W	—	1830s or 1840s	The boundary stone is in calciferous sandstone. It consists of a square stone with a flattened top, which is inscribed on two faces.	II
The Cranemakers Public House; 54.88825°N 2.92491°W		1830s or 1840s	Originally a house, later a public house, it is in brick on a chamfered plinth, with quoins, a cornice, and a green slate roof with coped gables. There are two storeys and three bays. The central doorway has a stone architrave, a cornice on brackets, and a fanlight. The windows are sashes in architraves, the window above the doorway having a cornice on consoles.	II
St Michael's Church; 54.90450°N 2.93497°W		1841–43	The church was designed by John Hodgson, and an apse was added to the east end in 1893. It is in sandstone on a chamfered plinth, with clasping buttresses rising to pinnacles, and a green slate roof with coped gables and cross finials. The church has a cruciform plan, and consists of a nave with transepts, a chancel with a north organ chamber and a south vestry, and a three-stage west tower with clock faces on three sides. The windows are lancets, those in the apse having round heads.	II
Congregational Church; 54.89296°N 2.93280°W		1842–43	The church is part of a terrace, it is built in calciferous sandstone, and has a front of three bays. In the centre is a tetrastyle portico with pilasters, a cornice on consoles, and a shaped parapet. Flanking it are cast iron railings and a gate leading to cellar steps. Each of the three bays contains a tall window in an architrave surmounted by an elaborately decorated cornice. The central bay projects forward, it is flanked by panelled pilaster quoins rising to form turrets, and in the centre is a shaped pediment with a shaft finial. At the tops of the outer bays are corner turrets and a balustraded parapet, and on all the turrets are speared ball finials.	II*
Statue of Francis Aglionby; 54.89335°N 2.93164°W		1843	The statue, by Musgrave Watson, commemorates Francis Aglionby, a local politician, and stands in front of the Crown Court. The statue is in Caen stone and depicts a life-size standing figure, dressed as a country gentleman, and holding a book. The figure stands on a pedestal of rusticated sandstone, on which is an inscribed slate plaque.	II
3 Castle Street; 54.89598°N 2.93999°W	—	1840s	A house, later an office, in calciferous sandstone on a chamfered plinth, with quoins, a string course, a cornice, a solid parapet, and a slate roof. There are two storeys and a symmetrical front of three bays. The central doorway has a tetrastyle surround with an entablature, a cornice, and a fanlight. The windows are sashes in architraves, those in the upper floor with cornices.	II
5–19 Chiswick Street and 1 Currie Street; 54.89438°N 2.92910°W	—	1840s	A terrace of twelve houses on Chiswick Street and one on Currie Street. They are in brick some with light headers on a chamfered plinth, with stone dressings, an eaves cornice, and a slate roof. They have two storeys and two bays, apart from two houses that have three bays. The houses have fanlights in pilastered surrounds, and sash windows. Two houses have bay windows, one squared, the other canted. To the left of No. 5 Chiswick Street is a quoined carriage entry.	II
1–8 Eden Mount and 1 Cromwell Crescent; 54.90324°N 2.93748°W	—	1840s	A terrace of nine houses in brick, most with light headers, on a chamfered plinth, with dressings in calciferous sandstone, quoins, string courses, an eaves cornice, and a stepped roof in green slate. There are two storeys, and each house has two or three bays, with four bays on St George's Crescent, and two bays, with a two-bay extension, on Cromwell Crescent. All but one of the houses has a prostyle Ionic porch and a fanlight, and the other doorway has a stone architrave. The windows are sashes in stone architraves, and there is a bay window on the right return.	II
9 Eden Mount; 54.90380°N 2.93738°W	—	1840s	A house on a corner site in brick with light headers on a chamfered plinth, with dressings in calciferous sandstone, a string course, quoins on the left angle, an eaves cornice, and a green slate roof. It has two storeys, s front of two bays, two bays on Cromwell Crescent, and a lower two-bay extension beyond. The door has an Ionic porch and a fanlight, and the windows are sashes in architraves.	II
6 and 8 Etterby Street; 54.90511°N 2.93787°W	—	1840s	A pair of houses in brick on a chamfered stone plinth with two storeys and sash windows in brick reveals with stone sills and flat brick arches. No. 6 has a green slate roof, three bays, a central doorway with a stone surround and a fanlight, and a segmental brick carriage arch to the right. No. 8 has a Welsh slate roof, two bays, a central round-headed doorway with a stone surround and a radial fanlight with a false keystone and imposts, and an oriel bay window.	II
72–80 Etterby Street; 54.90585°N 2.94111°W	—	1840s	A row of five houses in a terrace, in brick with light headers on a chamfered stone plinth and with Welsh slate roofs. They have two storeys, No. 76 has three bays and the others have two each. The doorways of Nos. 72–76 have fanlights with pilastered surrounds, false keystones, and imposts. Nos. 78 and 80 have projecting stuccoed porches. The windows are mostly sashes in stone architraves.	II
82 and 84 Etterby Street; 54.90591°N 2.94173°W	—	1840s	A pair of mirrored houses at the end of a terrace in brick with light headers on a chamfered plinth with a Welsh slate roof. There are two storeys, and each house has two bays. The doorways have stone surrounds and fanlights, and the windows are sashes in architraves.	II
5–61 St Nicholas Street; 54.88804°N 2.92628°W		1840s	A terrace of 28 houses in brick with pale headers, some stuccoed, and with Welsh slate roofs. They have two storeys, and each house has one or two bays. The doorways are paired, each with a pilastered surround, and between each pair of doorways is a round-arched passage with a plank door and some have a radial fanlight. Some sash window remain, but most are 20th-century casements. The property at the right end, No. 61, was originally a public house, and has a rounded corner containing a painted panel.	II
71 Warwick Road; 54.89364°N 2.92888°W	—	1840s	A brick house in a terrace, on a chamfered plinth, with stone dressings, a cornice, and a Welsh slate roof. There are two storeys and two bays. The main doorway, and a doorway to a through passage to the right, both have round-headed surrounds and fanlights. The windows are sashes in stone architraves.	II
95 and 97 Warwick Road; 54.89399°N 2.92762°W	—	1840s	A pair of houses in a terrace, in brick with light headers on a chamfered plinth, with stone dressings, a cornice, and a green slate roof. They have two storeys, and each house has two bays. Between the houses is a carriage entrance with a rusticated segmental arch. The doorways have stone surrounds and radial patterned fanlights, and most of the windows are casements in stone architraves. No. 95 has a gabled dormer, and No. 97 has a canted bay window. In front of the houses are the original cast iron railings.	II
113 and 115 Warwick Road; 54.89441°N 2.92597°W	—	1840s	A pair of mirrored houses in brick with light headers on a chamfered plinth, with stone dressings and a cornice. The roof of No. 113 is in Welsh slate, and that of No. 115 is in green slate. There are two storeys, and each house has two bays. Steps lead up to the central doorways that have round heads, stone surrounds, and fanlights. Flanking these are canted bay windows, and in the upper floor are sash windows in stone architraves.	II
Caledonian Mill; 54.89244°N 2.93636°W	—	1840s	Originally a warehouse, later used for other purposes, it is in sandstone on a chamfered plinth, with quoins, a gutter with stone brackets, and a slate roof. There are four storeys at the front, five at the rear, and twelve bays. There are ground floor doorways, casement windows, and a loading bay with a door on each floor and a gabled hoist head.	II
Newtown House; 54.89495°N 2.96676°W	—	1840s	A stuccoed house on a chamfered plinth, with broad angle pilasters, a modillioned eaves cornice, a solid parapet, and green slate roofs, hipped on the wings. There is a main block of two storeys and three bays, with flanking single-storey single-bay wings. In the centre is a prostyle Tuscan porch, and the windows are sashes in stone architraves.	II
Statue of Earl of Lonsdale; 54.89205°N 2.93281°W		1846	The statue commemorates the 1st Earl of Lonsdale and was moved to its present site in 1930. The figure is in white marble, and the rest of the structure in calciferous sandstone. It consists of a square base and plinth, both rusticated, a shaft carrying an inscription, and the figure of the earl dressed in the robe and costume of the Order of the Garter.	II
Citadel Station; 54.89108°N 2.93326°W		1847–48	The station was designed by William Tite, it is in Tudor style, and was extended in 1879–80. It is in calciferous sandstone on a chamfered plinth, and has a green slate roof. There are two storeys and numerous bays. In the centre is a five-bay porte-cochère, which is flanked by offices with mullioned and transomed windows. There is an octagonal clock tower on a square base. Behind are island platforms with two-storey buildings and a central footbridge under a glazed roof.	II*
5–33 Spencer Street and 1 and 3 Chiswick Street; 54.89472°N 2.93045°W	—	Late 1840s	A terrace of 16 houses on Spencer Street and two on Chiswick Street. They are in brick with light headers on a chamfered plinth, with dressings in calciferous sandstone, an eaves cornice, and a green slate roof, hipped at the corner. They have two storeys, the houses on Spencer Street have two bays each, and those on Chiswick Street have three. Each house has a Tuscan porch and a fanlight, and the windows are sashes. Two houses have canted bay windows, one has a two-storey sandstone squared bay window, and one has a gabled dormer.	II
3–17 Victoria Place; 54.89506°N 2.93211°W	—	Late 1840s	A row of houses, later offices, built in phases up to the late 1880s. They are in calciferous sandstone on a moulded plinth, with a string course, a cornice, a low parapet and a slate roof. There are two storeys, some have cellars, and they have three bays each, apart from No. 17 which has four. The doorways are paired, approached up steps, and have prostyle Ionic porches and fanlights. The windows are sashes, one house has a dormer, and No. 17 has a segmental carriage arch.	II*
61 Warwick Road and 51 Spencer Street; 54.89351°N 2.92956°W	—	Late 1840s	A pair of houses on a corner site, in brick with light headers on a chamfered plinth, with dressings in calciferous sandstone, quoins, an eaves cornice, and a hipped slate roof. They have two storeys, No. 61 Warwick Road has three bays on Warwick Road and one on Spencer Street, and No. 51 Spencer Street has four bays. The doorways are flanked by columns and have radial fanlights, and the windows are sashes with brick reveals, stone sills, and flat brick arches.	II
Midland Bank; 54.89376°N 2.93507°W		1849	The bank and manager's house were refronted in 1898, and extended in the 1920s. They are faced in Portland stone, and the roof is of Welsh slate. The bank has two storeys and a basement, with four bays on English Street, three on Bank Street, and a canted bay on the corner. The house on Bank Street is the same height with three storeys and two bays. The entrance to the bank is on the corner, and has a porch with pairs of red granite Tuscan columns, a round-headed doorway, above which is a balustraded balcony, a three-light window, a segmental pediment containing a clock face, and a cupola with an open arcade, and a domed roof with a weathervane. In the ground floor are round-headed windows between which are pairs of granite pilasters, and in the upper floor are flat-headed sash windows with rusticated surrounds and keystones. Along the top of the bank is a balustraded parapet. The manager's house has a round-headed doorway with a segmental pediment, a round-headed window in the ground floor, and sash windows above. (Note: Street View in September 2014 shows that it is now a branch of HSBC.)	II
2 and 4 Hartington Place; 54.89434°N 2.92650°W	—	Late 1840s or early 1850s	A pair of brick houses on a chamfered plinth, with dressings in calciferous sandstone and a hipped Welsh slate roof. They have two storeys, No. 2 has two bays on Hartington Place and two on Warwick Road, and No. 4 has four bays. Each house has a Tuscan dentilled doorcase and a fanlight, the windows are sashes with flat brick arches, and in the roof of each house is a dormer.	II
35–49 Spencer Street and 2 Chiswick Street; 54.89387°N 2.92987°W	—	Late 1840s or early 1850s	A terrace of eight houses on Spencer Street and one round the corner on Chiswick Street. They are in brick, with pale headers, on chamfered stone plinths, with dressings in calciferous sandstone, a cornice, and a Welsh slate roof. They have two storeys and most have two bays; No. 35 has three bays on Spencer Street, a rounded bay on the corner, and two bays on Chiswick Street; No. 2 Chiswick Street has three bays. The doors have fanlights and Tuscan porches, and the windows are sashes. No. 49 Spencer Street has a canted bay window.	II
1, 2 and 3 Stanwix Bank; 54.90277°N 2.93696°W	—	1840s or early 1850s	A terrace of three brick houses on a chamfered plinth, with dressings in calciferous sandstone, a string course, and a Welsh slate roof. They have two storeys with basements, and two bays each. The round-headed doorways have stone surrounds and fanlights, and the windows are sashes.	II
Cumbria College of Art and Design: Homeacres; 54.90549°N 2.93184°W	—	Late 1840s or early 1850s	Originally a house, later part of a college, it is rendered on a squared plinth, and has dressings of calciferous sandstone, a string course, a dentilled wooden cornice, and a green slate roof, partly hipped. There are two storeys, a front of four bays, a left return of three bays, and a gabled right wing. In the wing is a canted bay window. The doorway has a stone surround, a fanlight, and sidelights, and the windows are sashes. Between the floors is a stone balcony with wrought iron balusters.	II
Holme Head House; 54.88159°N 2.94117°W	—	Mid 19th century	Originally a manager's house, later used as offices, it is in brick on a chamfered plinth, with stone dressings, a string course, an eaves cornice, and a hipped slate roof. There are two storeys, a front of three bays, two-bay returns, and a double-depth plan. Steps lead up to the doorway that has a pilastered porch and a fanlight. This is flanked by canted bay windows, and in the upper floor are sash windows in stone architraves.	II
Offices of North West Water; 54.88121°N 2.94194°W	—	Mid 19th century	The offices were extended in 1899 with the addition of a storey and three bays. They are in sandstone with quoins, a stone-bracketed metal gutter, and a hipped green slate roof. There are two storeys and a basement, and twelve bays. In the original central bay is a pilastered porch, approached by flanking stone steps with cast iron railings. The windows are sashes in stone surrounds.	II
Cavendish Hill; 54.90219°N 2.93842°W	—	c. 1850	A stuccoed house on a chamfered plinth with angle pilasters, an eaves cornice and a hipped green slate roof. There are two storeys, a front of three bays, returns of two bays, rear extensions, and a double-depth plan. The central doorway has an Ionic porch and a fanlight. The windows are sashes in architraves, and there is a gabled dormer with a shield above it.	II
5–51 Bank Street, 1 Lowthian Lane and 45 Lowther Street; 54.89384°N 2.93418°W		1851	A terrace of twelve shops and offices with flats above, in brick with light headers on a chamfered plinth, with dressings in calciferous sandstone, string courses, a cornice on brackets, and a slate roof. The shops have three storeys, and form a continuous front of 31 bays, each unit having two, three or four bays. In the ground floor are 20th-century shop fronts, and above the windows are sashes, those in the middle floor having hood moulds. At the rear, and integral, is a former public house, in two storeys and two bays.	II
28–34 Eden Street; 54.90756°N 2.94438°W	—	Early 1850s	A row of four houses in a terrace, in brick with light headers on a chamfered plinth, with stone dressings and a slate roof. They have two storeys, a double-depth plan, and each house has two bays. The doorways are round-headed with radial fanlights, and the windows are sashes in brick reveals with stone sills and flat brick arches.	II
1–21 Tait Street; 54.89080°N 2.92917°W	—	Early 1850s	A terrace of eleven houses in brick with pale headers, dressings in calciferous sandstone, and slate roofs. They have two storeys with basements, and each house has two bays, and a double-depth plan. Steps lead up to the doorways that are flanked by columns and have radial fanlights. Between the doorways of Nos. 13–21 are through passages. The windows are a mix of sashes and casements.	II
10–30 Tait Street and 1 James Terrace; 54.89068°N 2.92893°W	—	Early 1850s	A terrace of twelve houses in brick with light headers on a chamfered plinth, with stone dressings, a metal gutter with stone brackets, and a roof of local slate. They have two storeys with basements, and two bays each. The doorways are approached up steps, the doorways are flanked by columns, and have stone lintels, and radial fanlights. Between some of the paired doorways are doors, some of which lead to through passages. Some windows are sashes, others are casements, all in stone architraves.	II
25, 27 and 29 Tait Street; 54.89113°N 2.92865°W	—	Early 1850s	A row of three houses in brick, Nos. 25 and 27 have light headers, on a chamfered plinth, with dressings in calciferous sandstone and slate roofs. They have two storeys, basements, a double-depth plan, Nos. 25 and 27 have two bays each, and No. 29 has three. The doorways are approached up steps, they are flanked by columns and have radial fanlights. Between the doorways of Nos. 25 and 27 and in the left bay of No. 29 are through passages. The windows are a mix of sashes and casements.	II
32, 34 and 36 Tait Street; 54.89115°N 2.92824°W	—	Early 1850s	Three brick houses with light headers on a chamfered plinth, with dressings in calciferous sandstone, metal gutters on stone brackets, and a hipped slate roof. They have two storeys with basements, two bays each, and a double depth plan. The round-headed doorways are flanked by columns, and have radial fanlights. The windows are sashes with stone surrounds.	II
20 and 22 Victoria Place and 1 Albert Street; 54.89540°N 2.93160°W	—	Early 1850s	Three houses, later used as a club, in two storeys, with sash windows and a hipped slate roof. No. 20 Victoria Place and No. 1 Albert Street are in sandstone on a plinth with dressings in calciferous sandstone, angle pilasters, and an eaves cornice. No. 20 Victoria Place has a front of four bays, with two bays on the left return, and has a prostyle Tuscan porch. No. 1 Albert Street has three bays, and a doorway with a pilastered surround. No. 24 Victoria Place is in brick with stone dressings, and has a Tuscan porch.	II
36–46 Victoria Place and 1 Compton Street; 54.89554°N 2.93038°W	—	Early 1850s	A row of seven houses, some later used for other purposes, in brick with light headers on a chamfered plinth, with dressings in calciferous sandstone, some with an eaves cornice, and a green slate roof. They have two storeys with basements, and two or three bays. Each house has a Tuscan doorcase and a fanlight, and sash windows.	II
1–11 Woodrouffe Terrace and 46 and 48 London Road; 54.88765°N 2.92539°W	—	Early 1850s	A terrace of eleven houses and two around the corner on London Road. They are in brick, some with light headers, on a chamfered plinth, with a modillioned eaves cornice, quoins on the corner, and a roof of various materials, mainly slate. They have two storeys, two houses have three bays, and the others have two. Most doorways have segmental heads, they are flanked by columns, and have radial fanlights; those on London Road have prostyle Ionic porches. The windows in the ground floor are sashes, and in the upper floor they are casements, all in stone architraves.	II
2–22 Bridge Terrace; 54.88211°N 2.94047°W	—	1852–53	A terrace originally of 16 houses, now eleven, in brick with light headers on a chamfered plinth, with dressings in calciferous sandstone, metal gutters with stone brackets, and a Welsh slate roof. They have two storeys and two or four bays each. The doorways have pilastered surrounds, in the ground floor are sash windows, and in the upper floor the windows are top-hung casements.	II
Cumbrian Hotel; 54.89119°N 2.93289°W		1852–53	The hotel was designed by Anthony Salvin, and extended in 1866–68 by Cory and Ferguson. It is stuccoed on a chamfered plinth, and has rusticated pilaster quoins, a string course, a cornice, and a green slate mansard roof with shaped pedimental dormers. The main front has three storeys, five bays and 15 bays on the right return. To the left on the front are two more bays over an archway, and then a projecting five-storey three-bay tower. Above the main doorway is a segmental pediment containing a coat of arms. The windows are sashes.	II
Milbourne Arms Public House; 54.89132°N 2.94227°W	—	1852–53	The public house is stuccoed over brick on a chamfered plinth, with quoins, a stone-bracketed metal gutter, and a hipped slate roof. It has two storeys, faces of three and two bays, and a double-depth plan. There are two doorways with pilastered surrounds and fanlights. The ground floor windows are casements in pilastered stucco surrounds with moulded sills and bracketed cornices, and in the upper floor are sash windows with stucco surrounds and scrolled aprons.	II
4–18 Victoria Place and 2 Albert Street; 54.89528°N 2.93253°W	—	1852–54	A terrace of nine houses, some later used for other purposes. They are in calciferous sandstone on a moulded plinth, with a string course, a cornice, a low parapet, and a slate roof. They have two storeys with cellars, and three bays each apart from No. 2 Albert Street, which has two. Each house has steps leading up to a prostyle Ionic porch and a doorway with a fanlight. The windows are sashes in plain reveals and with recessed aprons. In front of the cellar areas are cast iron patterned railings.	II*
Lloyd's Bank; 54.89293°N 2.93331°W		c. 1853	The former bank, on a corner site, is in calciferous sandstone with dressings in polished granite, and has string courses, a bracketed eaves cornice, and a slate roof. There are three storeys, four bays on each street, and an entrance bay on the corner. The doorway is flanked by columns, and has a segmental pediment. Flanking this on each face are large casement windows and further doorways, all with paired column surrounds. The other windows are sashes with cornice hoods, those in the middle floor having fluted pilaster surrounds, and in the top floor with architraves.	II
2 and 4 Devonshire Street and 69, 71 and 73 English Street; 54.89272°N 2.93415°W	—	c. 1854	A block of commercial premises on a corner site in calciferous sandstone with string courses, a bracketed eaves cornice, and a hipped green slate roof. There are three storeys, seven bays on Devonshire Street, five on English Street, and a canted entrance bay on the corner. The ground floor contains 20th-century windows with pilasters between them and a cornice above. In the upper floors are sash windows, those in the middle floor having alternate segmental and triangular pediments.	II
Cumbria College of Art and Design: The Cottage and Homeacres Cottage; 54.90676°N 2.93099°W	—	1854	This was built as a reform school, it was later extended, and subsequently became part of a college. It is in brick with dressings in calciferous sandstone and a green slate roof. The building has a single storey and five bays, with a two-bay extension to the right. The outer bays of the original part project forward and are gabled, the left bay containing a canted bay window. The other windows on the front are mullioned with cast iron tracery. On the left return is a porch with a door in a stone surround, and at the rear the windows are casements.	II
1, 2 and 3 Etterby Scaur; 54.90649°N 2.94536°W	—	1850s	A terrace of three houses in brick with pale headers, dressings in calciferous sandstone, quoins on the right, a cornice, and a green slate roof with a right coped gable. They have two storeys, and each house has two bays and a double-depth plan. The doors have an Ionic doorcase and a fanlight, and the windows are sashes in architraves. No. 1 has a canted bay window, and Nos. 2 and 3 have doors with fanlights leading to through passages.	II
109 Warwick Road; 54.89432°N 2.92634°W	—	1850s	A terraced house in brick with light headers on a chamfered plinth, with dressings in calciferous sandstone, a cornice, and a green slate roof. There are two storeys with a basement, and two bays. Steps lead up to a doorway that has a fanlight with a pilastered surround. The windows are sashes, and in the roof is a boxed dormer and a gabled dormer.	II
Offices of North West Water; 54.88131°N 2.94127°W	—	1850s	Originally a cotton factory, later expanded, and since used as offices. The building is in brick on a chamfered plinth with dressings in red sandstone, a stone-bracketed metal gutter, and a hipped double-span slate roof with skylights. It has three storeys, a front of 13 bays, and returns of five bays. The windows are casements, and projecting from the wall is a damaged drinking fountain in polished granite.	II
4 and 5 Paternoster Row; 54.89511°N 2.93950°W	—	1855	A house and a shop in brick on a chamfered stone plinth, with dressings in calciferous sandstone, string courses, and a Welsh slate roof. They have two storeys, the house has three bays, and the shop has two. The house to the left has a doorway with a quoined surround and is flanked by Shap granite Corinthian columns.	II
153 Richardson Street and Cemetery Office; 54.88151°N 2.95052°W		1855–56	These consist of the curator's house and the office of the cemetery, and were designed by J. M. and J. Hay. The buildings are in brick on a chamfered plinth, and have dressings in calciferous sandstone, quoins, a modillioned eaves cornice, and a green slate roof with coped gables and cross finials. The house, to the left has two storeys and one bay. To the right is a through pointed arch with a gable, and to the right of that is the office, in one storey and four bays. The windows are mullioned with pointed-headed lights, and the doorways have chamfered stone surrounds and depressed pointed heads.	II
Cemetery Chapel; 54.88025°N 2.94945°W		1855–56	Originally the Anglican chapel, designed by J. M. and J. Hay, it is in brick on a chamfered plinth with dressings in calciferous sandstone, including quoins, and a modillioned eaves cornice. The roof is in green slate with coped gables, and finials. The chapel consists of a nave, a west porch, and an east transept. Over the door is a rose window.	II
Gates and gate piers, Carlisle Cemetery; 54.88069°N 2.95480°W	—	1855–56	The gates and gate piers were designed by J. M. and J. Hay. The piers are in calciferous sandstone ashlar, and have buttresses and triple-gabled caps. The wrought iron double gates are simple and speared.	II
Mortuary Chapel; 54.88045°N 2.95201°W		1855–56	Built originally as the Nonconformist chapel for Carlisle Cemetery, and designed by J. M. and J. Hay, it is red brick on a moulded plinth, with dressings in calciferous sandstone, quoins, a string course, an eaves cornice, buttresses, and a green slate roof with coped gables and finials. On the south front is a doorway with a pointed arch, flanked by paired lancet windows, and an open bellcote.	II
West Lodge, Carlisle Cemetery; 54.88054°N 2.95469°W		1855–56	The lodge at the entrance to the cemetery was designed by J. M. and J. Hay. It is in red brick on a chamfered stone plinth, and has dressings in calciferous sandstone, quoins, string courses, a modillioned eaves cornice, and a partly hipped Welsh slate roof. There are two storeys and two bays. In the left bay is a doorway with a chamfered surround. The right bay projects, it is gabled, and it has a squared bay window that contains a three-light mullioned window with pointed heads, and there is a similar two-light window in the upper floor.	II
Monument to Peter Nicholson; 54.88044°N 2.95029°W	—	1856	The monument, in Carlisle Cemetery, is to the memory of the architect Peter Nicholson, and was designed by Robert William Billings. It is in calciferous sandstone and consists of a tall triangular shaft on a stepped chamfered plinth with a cornice, on which stands an off-set tapering spire. There is an inscription on the shaft.	II*
Monument to Dean Tait's children 54.90392°N 2.93447°W		1856	The monument is in the churchyard of St Michael's Church. It is in calciferous sandstone and consists of a cross on a hexagonal plinth. The cross is surrounded by a low rectangular kerb with speared cast iron railings.	II
Dispensary; 54.89555°N 2.93296°W		1857	The former dispensary is in calciferous sandstone on a squared plinth, with a modillioned eaves cornice, an inscribed frieze, and a slate roof with coped gables. There are two storeys and four bays. In the left bay is a doorway with a pilastered surround, a fanlight, and a pediment. The windows are sashes with stone architraves, those in the ground floor having pediments. On the front is an inscribed plaque.	II
21 and 22 Portland Square and 4 Wilfrid Street; 54.89207°N 2.92887°W	—	Late 1850s	A terrace of three houses on a corner site, later offices, in brick with light headers on a stone plinth, with dressings in calciferous sandstone, a string course, stone-bracketed metal gutters, and a slate roof hipped at the corner. There are two storeys, each house has two bays on Portland Square, and there are three bays on Wilfrid Street. The doorways on Portland Square have prostyle Ionic porches and fanlights, and in the ground floor are bay windows, some canted, others square. The other windows are sashes in stone architraves with panelled aprons.	II
117, 119 and 121 Warwick Road; 54.89449°N 2.92517°W	—	1850s or 1860s	Three houses in a terrace, in brick on a chamfered plinth, with stone dressings and a Welsh slate roof. They have two storeys, and each house has two bays. The houses have a Tuscan doorcase with a dentilled cornice, and a fanlight. In the ground floor are canted bay windows. The upper floor in No. 119 contains casement windows, and in the other houses they are sashes in brick reveals with stone sills and flat brick arches.	II
Statue of James Steel; 54.89364°N 2.93530°W		1859	The statue of James Steel, former mayor of the city, is by William F. Woodington, and was moved to its present site from the Market Place in 1989. It has a base and plinth of Dalbeattie granite, on which is a white marble figure. The base is square, with four bollards, and the plinth is stepped with an inscription on its shaft. On the plinth is a standing figure, larger than life-size, holding a scrolled paper. The left hand is broken off.	II
4 The Abbey; 54.89399°N 2.93812°W	—	1859–63	A house and offices in sandstone on a chamfered plinth with quoins, a string course, and a green slate roof with coped gables. It has two storeys, a front and returns of three bays, and a two-bay extension at the rear. The outer bays at the front are gabled. There is a central doorway with a pointed arch, a two-light fanlight and a hood mould. To the right is a two-storey squared bay window. Most of the windows are mullioned and transomed, and on the sides are canted bay windows.	II
49 and 51 Chiswick Street and 1 and 1A Hartington Place; 54.89455°N 2.92716°W		Late 1850s or early 1860s	Four houses, originally three, in brick on a chamfered plinth, with dressings in calciferous sandstone, quoins, and a Welsh slate roof. They have two storeys and either two or three bays, the bay on the corner being canted. The doorways have Tuscan porches and fanlights, and the windows are sashes.	II
6–20 Hartington Place; 54.89473°N 2.92677°W		Late 1850s or early 1860s	A terrace of eight houses in brick, some with light headers, on a chamfered plinth, with dressings in calciferous sandstone and a Welsh slate roof. The houses have two storeys and two bays each. Every house has a doorway with a fanlight and a Tuscan doorcase, those of Nos. 6–14 also with a dentilled cornice. Each house has a canted bay window, Nos. 6 and 8 in two storeys, the others in one. The windows are sashes with flat brick arches and stone sills, and two houses have a pair of gabled dormers.	II
2 and 4 Howard Place; 54.89454°N 2.92543°W	—	1850s or early 1860s	A pair of brick houses with light headers on a chamfered plinth, with dressings in calciferous sandstone, metal gutters with stone brackets, and a slate roof, hipped at the corner. There are two storeys, each house has three bays, and there is a one-bay return on the right. Each house has a central doorway with a Tuscan doorcase and a fanlight. The windows are sashes, and there is a two-storey canted bay window in the left bay of No. 2.	II
28 Portland Square and 6 and 8 Brunswick Street; 54.89293°N 2.92946°W	—	Late 1850s or early 1860s	A row of houses, later offices, in brick on a squared plinth with stone dressings, a string course, metal gutters with brackets, and a green slate roof. They have two storeys, No. 6 Brunswick Street has three bays, and the others have two. The doorways are approached up steps, and have Ionic porches and fanlights. The windows are sashes in architraves, and two houses have canted bay windows.	II
105 and 107 Warwick Road; 54.89414°N 2.92699°W	—	Late 1850s or early 1860s	A pair of houses at the end of a terrace, in brick with light headers on a chamfered plinth, with dressings in calciferous sandstone. No. 105 has a roof of green slate; the roof of No. 107 is in Welsh slate, it is hipped on the corner, and contains gabled dormers. The houses have two storeys, a double-depth plan, No. 105 has four bays, and No. 107 has two bays on Warwick Road and four on Hartington Place. Each doorway has a stone architrave and a dentilled bracketed cornice. The windows of No. 105 are sashes, and those of No. 107 are casements.	II
Carlisle Christian Fellowship; 54.89128°N 2.94176°W		1860	Built as a Congregational Church and later used by other denominations, it was extended by the addition of a lecture room in 1878. The church is built in calciferous sandstone, and has quoins, buttresses, and a green slate roof. There is an octagonal three-storey central drum, flanking wings of two, three and four bays, a three-bay extension, and the lecture hall, which has apsidal ends. The wings are gabled, and the drum has a pyramidal roof.	II
Waverley Viaduct; 54.89948°N 2.96339°W		1861	The viaduct was built by the North British Railway to carry the Carlisle to Edinburgh line over the River Eden, and is now disused. It is in sandstone with brick arches, and consists of six arches on a slight curve. The arches are segmental, and are carried on round piers with voussoirs and brick soffits. The viaduct has a moulded string course and a solid parapet with chamfered coping.	II
13 Earl Street; 54.89338°N 2.93184°W	—	1862	Originally a police station, later an office, it is in brick with light headers, and has dressings in red sandstone, a string course, a stone-bracketed metal gutter, and a Welsh slate roof. There are two storeys, three bays, and a double-depth plan. The doorway has a pilastered surround and a fanlight, and the windows are sashes in brick reveals with stone sills and lintels.	II
St George's Church and manse 54.89319°N 2.93121°W		1862–63	Originally an English Presbyterian church, later a United Reformed Church, it is in Romanesque style. The church is built in sandstone with a Welsh slate roof, it has a semi-basement and a rectangular plan, with a three-stage tower that has an embattled parapet. The windows in the semi-basement are flat-arched, and those elsewhere are round-headed. The entrance is also round-headed, with a hood mould. The manse, attached to the right, dates from 1880. It is in orange brick with dressings in yellow sandstone, and has a Welsh slate roof. There are two bays, two storeys with an attic and a basement, The left bay is gabled and contains a two-storey canted bay window, and in the right bay is a round-headed entrance.	II
8, Lowther Street; 54.89307°N 2.93286°W	—	1863	Built as a post office, an additional storey was added in 1899, and it was converted into a public house in 1916. The building is in calciferous sandstone on a chamfered plinth, and has quoins, pilasters, a string course, a cornice, and a parapet. There are three storeys and three bays. In the ground floor is a doorway with a fanlight and, to the right, three casement windows with panelled aprons, divided by pilasters. In the upper floors the windows are sashes. In the middle floor they are round-headed in architraves with panelled aprons, and in the top floor they have flat heads and aprons containing roundels.	II
Skiddaw Building; 54.89139°N 2.92246°W		1863–64	This was originally a workhouse designed by Lockwood and Mawson, and later used as a hospital. It is in brick on a chamfered plinth, and has dressings in calciferous sandstone, angle pilastered quoins, string courses, a dentilled cornice, and a hipped green slate roof. There are three storeys, and a front of 23 bays. In the centre is a bellcote and a clock. The middle five bays are pedimented and are flanked by projecting single bays rising to lead-domed cupolas. Outside these are nine bays on each side, ending in a single projecting bay. The central doorway has a round arch, and the windows are 20th-century casements. (Note: Street View in June 2015 showed this to be part of the University of Cumbria)	II
City Maternity Hospital; 54.89088°N 2.92213°W	—	1863–64	Designed by Lockwood and Mawson, this originated as the hospital wing of a workhouse. It is in brick on a chamfered plinth with dressings in calciferous sandstone, quoined angle pilasters, string courses, a dentilled cornice, and a hipped green slate roof. There are two storeys, seven bays, and flanking lower three-bay windows. The outer bays of the main block project forward and are pedimented. The central doorway has a round-headed pilastered surround, and the windows are sashes. In the ground floor of the central part the windows have round stone arches, in the upper floor they have brick segmental heads. In the outer bays the ground floor have three lights, and in the upper floor two lights with a central colonnette. (Note: Street View in June 2015 showed this to be part of the University of Cumbria)	II
27 Portland Square; 54.89280°N 2.92943°W	—	1864	Originally a house, later an office, it is in brick on a chamfered plinth, with stone dressings, a string course, and a green slate roof. There are two storeys with an attic, and three bays. In the right bay is a door with a fanlight and a Venetian Gothic surround with colonnettes supporting a heavy bracketed hood. To the left is a three-light bay window, in the upper floor are sash windows in architraves with decorated sills, and in the attic is a full-length dormer.	II
31 and 33 Chiswick Street and 2 Currie Street; 54.89444°N 2.92824°W	—	1860s	Three houses at the end of a terrace in brick with light headers on a chamfered plinth, with dressings in calciferous sandstone, an eaves cornice, and a Welsh slate roof, hipped at the corner. There are two storeys and each house has two bays. Steps lead up to the doorways, which have pilastered surrounds and fanlights. The windows are sashes with flat brick arches.	II
12, 14 and 16 Devonshire Street; 54.89282°N 2.93375°W	—	1860s	A pair of shops in calciferous sandstone with string courses and an eaves cornice. They have three storeys, No. 12 has three bays, and No. 14/16 has two. No. 12 has two round arches in the ground floor, the left leading to a through passage, and with a colonnette between them. In the middle floor are three round-arched sash windows with colonnettes, a continuous hood mould, and a false cast iron balcony. Above are sash windows in architraves, a solid parapet, and a dormer with a shaped gable. No. 14/16 has a shop front in the ground floor, sash windows above, boxed dormers and a mansard roof.	II
111 Warwick Road; 54.89432°N 2.92621°W	—	1860s	A house in a terrace, in brick with light headers on a chamfered plinth, with dressings in calciferous sandstone, an eaves string course and cornice, and a slate roof. It has two storeys and three bays. Steps lead up to a doorway with a stone architrave, a dentilled cornice and a fanlight. This is flanked by canted bay windows with a shaped parapet. The windows in the upper floor are sashes in architraves.	II
Devonshire Chambers; 54.89279°N 2.93384°W	—	1860s	Two shops with offices above in calciferous sandstone with an eaves cornice and a slate roof, partly mansard. There are three storeys and six bays. The doorway has a moulded surround and a fanlight, and above it is a carved inscribed panel; the doorway is flanked by 20th-century shop fronts. In the first floor are sash windows, the outer ones paired with central colonnette that have leaf capitals. In the top floor are sash windows in stone architraves, and in the roof are 20th-century dormers.	II
Mill, Holme Head Works; 54.8818°N 2.9430°W		1865	A former cotton spinning mill that was extended in 1907, when a water tower was added, and again in 1913. It is in brick with pilasters and a dentilled cornice. On the tower is a hipped slate roof. The mill has four storeys, and fronts of 14 and five bays; the tower has six storeys. The windows are casements with steel frames, brick reveals and flat brick arches.	II
Griffin Hotel; 54.89152°N 2.93252°W		1865–67	Originally a bank for the Cumberland Union Banking Company, later used as a hotel. It is on a corner site and is built in calciferous sandstone on a chamfered plinth, with pilastered quoins, pilasters, string courses, bracketed cornice, an open balustraded parapet, and a green slate roof. There are three storeys, four bays on each front and an angled bay on the corner. The entrance on the corner has a tetrastyle porch with a modillioned cornice and a balustraded balcony, and a round-headed doorway with a quoined arch. The ground floor windows are round-headed casements, and above are sash windows with round and segmental arches and paired columns.	II
St James' Church; 54.88556°N 2.94693°W		1865–67	The church is built in red sandstone with quoins of yellow sandstone, dressings and string courses in calciferous sandstone, an eaves cornice, and stepped buttresses. The roofs are of green slate with coped gables and cross finials. The church consists of a nave with a clerestory, aisles, a northwest porch, transepts, a chancel with an apse, and a southwest steeple. The steeple has three stages, a west doorway, clasping buttresses, lancet windows on three levels, and a broach spire with lucarnes. The windows contain Geometrical tracery.	II
County Bar and Cumbrian Hotel (part); 54.89140°N 2.93220°W	—	1866–68	Originally part of a hotel designed by Cory and Ferguson, and later used for other purposes, it is in brick, and has rusticated pilastered quoins, string courses, a modillioned eaves cornice, and a slate roof. There are three storeys with attics, and three bays. It has a central doorway with colonnettes and a glazed canopy, flanked by shop fronts. In the first floor are arcades of casement windows, and above the windows are sashes. In the roof are gabled dormers.	II
1 Howard Place; 54.89448°N 2.92584°W	—	Late 1860s	A brick house with light headers on a corner site. It has a chamfered plinth, stone dressings, a stone cornice on Warwick Road, a stone-bracketed gutter on the front, and a Welsh slate roof, hipped on the corner. There are two storeys, four bays on the front and two on the left return. On the front is a doorway with pilasters, a cornice, and a fanlight. The windows on the front are sashes with brick reveals. On the Warwick Road front is a canted bay window, and sash windows in stone architraves above.	II
10, 12 and 14 Lowther Street; 54.89334°N 2.93294°W	—	1868	The original building was for a wine and spirits merchant, and the extension comprising offices to the left was added in 1881, both designed by Daniel Birkett. They are in calciferous sandstone on a chamfered plinth, with a continuous bracketed cornice and a balustraded parapet, and a green slate roof. The original part has two storeys, three bays, a pair of round-headed doorways with fanlights, and above is an oriel window with a conical roof, flanked by sash windows. The extension has 2 1/2 storeys and five bays. In the ground floor are two doorways, two canted bay windows, and a pair of round-headed windows. The windows in the upper floors are casements, those in the top floor in half-dormers under shaped pediments.	II
18 and 20 Chiswick Street; 54.89414°N 2.92875°W	—	1869	A pair of houses in a terrace, in brick with light headers on a chamfered plinth, with dressings in calciferous sandstone, a string course, a metal gutter with stone brackets, and a Welsh slate roof. The houses have two storeys, two bays each, and a double-depth plan. In each house steps lead up to a doorway with a Tuscan porch and a fanlight. To the right is a squared bay window, and above are sash windows in brick reveals with stone sills and flat brick arches.	II
St Paul's Church; 54.89404°N 2.93068°W		1869–70	Originally an Anglican church, later an Elim Church, it is in sandstone on a chamfered plinth, with stepped buttresses, a string course, and has green slate roofs with coped gables and cross finials. The church consists of a nave with a clerestory, aisles, transepts, a chancel with a north vestry, and at the northeast is the base of an uncompleted tower that incorporates a porch.	II
Chatsworth House; 54.89517°N 2.92705°W	—	1870	Originally the vicarage for St Paul's Church, later a private house, it is in brick on a chamfered plinth, with dressings of calciferous sandstone, string courses, and a Welsh slate roof. It has two storeys with an attic, a double-depth plan, three bays, the right bay being a gabled cross-wing, giving the house an L-shaped plan. In the centre is a round-arched porch with quoins and a hipped roof. Above the door is a fanlight. In the outer bays are two-storey canted bay windows. The windows are sashes with decorative lintels and a dentilled cornice.	II
Wall and railings, central gardens, Portland Square; 54.89233°N 2.92823°W	—	1870	The gardens are surrounded by a low chamfered sandstone wall, on which are patterned cast iron speared railings. On each side of the square are gate openings, without gates, flanked by cast iron octagonal piers with ball-and-spear finials.	II
4–12 Chiswick Street; 54.89411°N 2.92921°W	—	Late 1860s or early 1870s	A terrace of five houses in brick on a chamfered plinth, with light headers, dressings in calciferous sandstone, and a Welsh slate roof. They have two storeys, two bays each, and a double-depth plan. Steps lead up to the doorways, which have pilastered surrounds and fanlights. The windows are sashes in stone architraves, and No. 10 has a gabled dormer.	II
14 and 16 Chiswick Street with gate piers 54.89413°N 2.92889°W	—	Late 1860s or early 1870s	A pair of brick houses on a chamfered plinth with stone dressings and a Welsh slate roof. They have two storeys, two bays each, and a double-depth plan. No. 14 has a porch with colonettes, capitals carved with leaves, and a dentilled cornice. Above the door is a fanlight. To the right is a square bay window containing two sashes, a central colonette, and a dentilled cornice. Above are sash windows with stone sills and lintels. The doorway of No. 16 has a fanlight, flanking columns with leaf capitals, and a rounded hood mould. To the right is a three-light sash window. This window and the sash windows above have brick arches and segmental hood moulds. In front of each house is a pair of octagonal gate piers each with a pyramidal cap.	II
22 Chiswick Street; 54.89418°N 2.92837°W	—	Late 1860s or early 1870s	A brick house on a chamfered plinth with stone dressings, a dentilled cornice, and a Welsh slate roof. It has two storeys, two bays, and a double-depth plan. The round-headed doorway has a fanlight, flanking columns with leaf capitals, a moulded brick surround, and a rounded hood mould. To the left is a three-light sash window; this window and the sash windows above have segmental brick arches and a continuous hood mould shaped over the windows.	II
24 and 26 Chiswick Street; 54.89418°N 2.92827°W	—	Late 1860s or early 1870s	A pair of houses at the end of a terrace, in brick with light headers on a chamfered plinth, with dressings in calciferous sandstone, quoins on the left corner, and a Welsh slate roof. They have two storeys, each house has two bays, and a double-depth plan. The doorways, approached up steps, have pilastered surrounds and fanlights, and the windows are sashes in stone architraves.	II
35–47 Chiswick Street; 54.89450°N 2.92765°W	—	Late 1860s or early 1870s	A row of seven houses in a terrace, in brick on a chamfered plinth and with a Welsh slate roof. Nos. 35–37 have bands of cream bricks. The houses have two storeys, and each house has two bays and a double-depth plan. The doorways have fanlights in stone architraves with dentilled cornices, and the windows are sashes in architraves. No. 45 has a single-storey canted bay window.	II
22 and 24 Hartington Place; 54.89502°N 2.92701°W	—	Late 1860s or early 1870s	A pair of brick houses at the end of a terrace on a chamfered plinth, with dressings in calciferous sandstone, a string course, and a Welsh slate roof. There are two storeys, and each house has two bays. The doors have stone surrounds, fanlights, and dentilled hoods with colonnettes. In the ground floor are square bay windows with modillioned cornices. In the upper floor the windows have shouldered lintels.	II
1–5 Portland Square, 4 Alfred Street and 3 Brunswick Street; 54.89298°N 2.92880°W		Late 1860s or early 1870s	A row of seven houses, later offices, the front on Portland Square being in calciferous sandstone, the left return on Brunswick Street in red brick, and the front on Albert Street in white brick. It is on a chamfered plinth with quoins, a string course, a metal gutter on stone brackets, and a green slate roof. There are two storeys, the houses on Portland Square have alternating two and three bays, and there are three bays on the returns. Each house has a prostyle Tuscan porch, bay windows in the ground floor, and sash windows in architraves in the upper floor. In the roof one house has gabled dormers, and the other have continuous boxed dormers.	II
6 and 7 Portland Square; 54.89309°N 2.92788°W	—	Late 1860s or 1870s	A pair of similar houses in a terrace. They are in calciferous sandstone on a moulded plinth, with a green slate roof. There are 2 1/2 storeys and cellars, and each house has two bays. Steps lead up to the doorways that have fanlights and shaped porches. In the ground floor are squared bay windows. The windows are sashes, those in the upper floor having hood moulds, and at the top they are in dormers or half-dormers with shaped gables.	II
8 and 9 Portland Square; 54.89292°N 2.92775°W	—	Late 1860s or 1870s	A pair of houses in a terrace, in calciferous sandstone on a moulded plinth, with string courses, a bracketed cornice, and a green slate roof. They have three storeys, and three bays each. Steps lead up to doorways with fanlights and porches flanked by columns and with shaped heads. To the left are canted bay windows, above which are projecting two-light sash windows. The other windows are also sashes, those above the doorway having hood moulds.	II
23 Portland Square and 3 Wilfred Street; 54.89243°N 2.92917°W		Late 1860s or early 1870s	Originally two houses, later an office, it is in red brick with a chamfered plinth and dressings including quoins, all in calciferous sandstone, and it has a hipped green slate roof. There are two storeys with attics, three bays on Portland Square, three on Wilfred Street, and behind at a lower level is No. 3 Wilfred Street with two storeys and three bays. The doorway on Portland Square has a fanlight and a Venetian Gothic surround with red sandstone colonnettes supporting a heavy bracketed hood. The doorway on Wilfred Street has a fanlight and a cornice. The windows are sashes in quoined surrounds.	II
43–51 Scotland Road; 54.90589°N 2.93750°W	—	Late 1860s or early 1870s	A terrace of five brick houses on a chamfered plinth, with dressings in red sandstone and a Welsh slate roof. They have two storeys, two bays each, and a double-depth plan. Each house has a doorway approached up steps with a prostyle Ionic porch and a fanlight. The windows are sashes, and one house has a canted bay window.	II
Larch House; 54.89199°N 2.92882°W	—	Late 1860s or early 1870s	A house, later an office, in brick on a stone plinth, with dressings in calciferous sandstone, quoins, a string course, a stone-bracketed metal gutter, and a Welsh slate roof. There are two storeys and three bays. In the centre is a prostyle Tuscan porch and a door with a fanlight that is flanked by bay windows in stone architraves with panelled aprons.	II
3, 5 and 7 Hartington Place and 20 Chatsworth Square; 54.89500°N 2.92735°W	—	Early 1870s	A row of four brick houses on a chamfered plinth, with dressings in calciferous sandstone, quoins on the corner, a string course, a metal gutter on stone brackets, and a Welsh slate roof hipped at the corner. They have two storeys, a double-depth plan, the houses on Hartington Place have two bays, and No. 20 Chatsworth Square has a front of four bays and a one-bay return. The doorways on Hartington Place have fanlights and a gabled stone porch with colonnettes that have leaf capitals. The doorway of No. 20 Chatsworth Place has a quoined surround, a fanlight, and a gabled head. The windows are sashes in brick reveals with stone sills and chamfered lintels.	II
6–26 Spencer Street; 54.89474°N 2.93116°W	—	Early 1870s	A terrace of eleven houses, some now used for other purposes, in red brick, two houses with light headers, and a corner house has quoins. The dressings are in calciferous sandstone, and they have stone-bracketed metal gutters and slate roofs. The houses have two storeys, one has three bays, the others have two each, and there is a canted corner bay and one bay on Lonsdale Street. Two houses have Venetian porches with colonnettes, leaf capitals and dentilled cornices, and the others have prostyle Tuscan porches. Most houses have canted bay windows, and two have square bay windows with dentilled cornices. The other windows are sashes, and there is a segmental quoined carriage archway between Nos. 22 and 24.	II
19, 21 and 23 Victoria Place; 54.89512°N 2.93157°W	—	Early 1870s	Originally three houses, some later used for other purposes, they are in calciferous sandstone on a chamfered plinth, with a stone-bracketed metal gutter and local slate roofs. The houses have two storeys, No. 19 has two bays, and the others have three. Nos. 19 and 23 have Tuscan doorcases, fanlights, and in the ground floor are three-light windows in eared architraves with keystones and scroll decoration. Between the houses is a segmental through-archway. No. 23 has a pilastered doorcase with leaf capitals, and in the ground floor are three-light windows with segmental heads. The other windows are sashes.	II*
Arkle House; 54.89421°N 2.93119°W	—	1874	A house, later an office, in brick on a chamfered plinth, with dressing in calciferous sandstone, a modillioned eaves cornice, a shaped pediment, and a Welsh slate roof. It has two storeys with a basement, three bays, and a double-depth plan. There is a central door with a fanlight, and a porch with twisted columns, a cornice and a parapet. To the left is a canted bay window. The other windows are sashes with dividing pilasters, shaped lintels, and relieving brick arches. The pediment has a three-light dormer, a circular date plaque, and a ball finial.	II
1, 3 and 5 Albert Street North; 54.89330°N 2.92806°W	—	1870s	A row of three houses, later offices, at the end of a terrace. They have a calciferous sandstone front and brick returns on a chamfered plinth and a green slate roof. The houses have three storeys and each has two bays. The doorway to No. 1 is flanked by half-columns, No, 3 has a Venetian porch, and No. 5 has an Ionic porch. All the houses have canted bay windows, that of No. 5 rising to two storeys. The upper floor windows have chamfered surrounds, No. 3 has gabled half-dormers, and No, 5 has Dutch gabled dormers.	II
Wall, railings and gates, Chatsworth Square; 54.89562°N 2.92867°W	—	1870s	The low wall surrounding the gardens is in sandstone with a chamfered coping. On the wall are speared and scrolled railings in cast and wrought iron, and the gates are similar, without piers.	II
10 Portland Square and railings 54.89290°N 2.92774°W	—	1870s	A house, later used as a club, in calciferous sandstone on a chamfered plinth, with bracketed string courses, a machicolated parapet, and a central gable with columns and a pediment. There are three storeys, three bays, and a double-depth plan. Steps lead up to a porch with Corinthian columns, a bracketed cornice and ball finials, and a doorway with a fanlight. This is flanked by canted bay windows. In the upper floors are sash windows, those in the middle floor having two or three lights with stilted heads, and in the top floor in stone architraves.	II
11–14 Portland Square and railings 54.89267°N 2.92758°W	—	1870s	A row of four houses, later used for other purposes, in calciferous sandstone on a chamfered plinth, with decorated string courses, a bracketed cornice, finials, and a green slate roof. There are three storeys with basements, a double-depth plan, and each house has two bays. Steps lead up to the doorways that have a decorated arched porch, half-columns and fanlights. In the ground floor are canted bay windows, and Nos. 11 and 12 have smaller square bay windows in the middle floor. The other windows are sashes in architraves. Nos. 13 and 14 have cast iron speared railings around the basement areas.	II
15A Abbey Street; 54.89488°N 2.94027°W	—	Late 19th century	A two-storey house, the lower storey being in sandstone and the upper in brick. There is a string course between the storeys, quoins on the left corner, and a Welsh slate roof with a coped gable. The house has three bays, in the outer bays are doorways with chamfered surrounds and fanlights, the left door leading to a through passage. The windows are sashes, those in the lower floor having stone reveals, and in the upper floor brick reveals.	II
50 and 52 Scotland Road; 54.90633°N 2.93702°W	—	Late 19th century	A mirrored pair of brick houses on a chamfered brick plinth with brick eaves modillions and a green slate roof. They have two storeys and each house has two bays. The paired doors have fanlights and round arched heads with engaged collonettes. In the ground floor are canted bay windows, and in the upper floor the windows in No. 50 are casements, and in No. 52 they are sashes.	II
Barclays Bank; 54.89359°N 2.93486°W		1874—76	The bank, on a corner site, is in calciferous sandstone on a moulded plinth, with string courses, a cornice, and a slate roof. There are two storeys, five bays on English Street, three on Bank Street, and an angled bay between. The doorway has a moulded surround, including columns with leaf capitals, and a hood mould. The ground floor windows are casements flanked by columns. In the upper floors are sash windows, in the middle floor they have chamfered surrounds with carved leaf decoration, and in the top floor they have bolection surrounds.	II
Monument to George Head Head; 54.90395°N 2.93456°W	—	1876	The monument is in the church yard of St Michael's Church. It consists of a table tomb in calciferous sandstone. The tomb has a stepped plinth, cusped openings on the sides, and inscriptions to the memory of George Head Head and his two wives.	II
Officers' Mess; 54.89675°N 2.94285°W	—	1876	The officers' mess and regimental offices are in the outer bailey of Carlisle Castle. The building is in sandstone on a chamfered plinth, and has a slightly projecting and corbelled parapet and a green slate roof. There are two storeys and six irregular bays. The projecting two-storey porch contains double doors with a fanlight, a stone surround, and a hood mould. Most of the windows are sashes in stone surrounds with hood moulds, and there is a three-light mullioned window.	II
2 and 4 Spencer Street; 54.89502°N 2.93118°W	—	Mid to late 1870s	A pair of houses at the end of a terrace, in brick on a chamfered plinth, with dressings in calciferous sandstone, quoins on the corner, a metal gutter on stone brackets, and a green slate roof, hipped on the corner. They have two storeys, No. 2 has four bays with one bay on the right return, and No. 4 has two bays. The doorway to No. 2 has a pilastered doorcase and a fanlight. To the left is a through-passage door in a stone surround, and to the right is a squared bay window. The doorway to No. 4 has a prostyle Tuscan porch and a fanlight. The other windows in both houses are sashes is eared architraves with false keystones.	II
28, 30 and 32 Bank Street; 54.89383°N 2.93361°W	—	Late 1870s	A shop with an office above on a corner site, in cream brick with red brick dressings, string courses and gutter brackets in red sandstone, and a slate roof. There are three storeys, six bays on Bank Street, two on Lowther Street, and one in the angled corner between. The ground floor contains 20th-century shop fronts. In the upper floors are sash windows, those in the middle floor having relieving arches, and in the top floor segmental arches.	II
Clydesdale Bank; 54.89370°N 2.93434°W	—	1878	Originally a bank, later used for other purposes, it is in sandstone on a chamfered plinth, with pilasters, string courses, and a pierced quatrefoil parapet. There are three storeys and seven bays. In the centre is a doorway with a segmental arch flanked by paired polished granite colonnettes and with a fanlight, and there are more doorways in the outer bays. The windows are cross-mullioned.	II
No. 4 gas holder 54.88700°N 2.93478°W		1878–79	The gas holder is set in a circular concrete pit. What remains consists of twelve round cast iron columns with ball and spear finials. Between them at three levels is wrought iron lattice girders and bracing.	II
West wall, Citadel Station; 54.89047°N 2.93429°W		1879–80	Originally attached to the main part of the station by the roof, it has been detached since the roof was removed in 1957–58. The wall is in calciferous sandstone on a base of red sandstone, and is still linked to the main part of the station by a series of tunnels, some of which are occupied by industrial units. Along the wall are broad pilasters between which are recessed panels with pointed heads.	II
16–19 Portland Square; 54.89218°N 2.92815°W	—	1870s or 1880s	A terrace of four houses, later offices, in calciferous sandstone on a chamfered plinth with a slate roof. They have 2 1/2 storeys with basements, and each house has two bays. The doorways have architraves with fanlights and hood moulds. In the ground floor are canted bay windows, above are sash windows, and in the roof are half-gabled dormers.	II
20 Portland Square and 5 Brunswick Street; 54.89210°N 2.92850°W	—	Late 1870s or 1880s	Formerly two houses, later one office, the front on Portland Square is in calciferous sandstone with a cornice and a hipped green slate roof. It has two storeys and a basement, three bays on Portland Square, and one on Brunswick Street. The former central door has been replaced by a sash window, and this is flanked by bay windows. The windows in the upper floor are sashes. No. 5 Brunswick Street has two storeys and six bays, a modillioned cornice, a doorway with a fanlight and a pilastered stone porch, and sash windows.	II
Central Plaza Hotel, stable range, and west city walls 54.89244°N 2.93572°W		1880	The hotel was extended in 1882. The lower parts are in red Sandstone, the upper parts are in calciferous sandstone, the dressings are in red sandstone, there are rusticated and fluted Corinthian pilasters, and a mansard slate roof with cast iron railings. The extensions are in brick. The hotel has 6 1/2 storeys, and three bays on the front and sides. The round-headed doorway has a moulded arch and a fanlight. It is flanked by bow windows, and above is a cast-iron balcony. In the first floor are Venetian windows, and above are casement windows and dormers with pediments. The stable range is in brick, partly stuccoed, and has open arches. Part of the hotel is built on to the West Walls. Due to its derelict nature, and being considered unsafe, the building has since been demolished, with work being completed in spring 2020.	II
Monument to Daniel Clark and railings 54.88114°N 2.94926°W	—	1880	The monument in Carlisle Cemetery is in memory of Daniel Clark, ironmonger, and members of his family. It is in calciferous sandstone and has a square base, a stepped plinth with angle pilasters, a cornice, and ball finials. On the plinth is a tapering shaft, and surrounding the memorial are cast iron ball and spear railings made in Clark's foundry.	II
15 Portland Square; 54.89224°N 2.92779°W	—	1881	Originally a house, later used as offices, it is in calciferous sandstone on a chamfered plinth, and has an eaves cornice and a green slate mansard roof. There are two storeys with attics and a basement, three bays on Portland Square and five on Alfred Street South. The round-arched doorway has a porch with fluted pilasters, a frieze and quatrefoil panels. Above the door is a fanlight. Flanking the porch are square bay windows, and there is another bay window on the left return. The windows are mullioned and transomed, and in the roof are dormers.	II
Goods Station; 54.88635°N 2.91938°W	—	1881	The goods station was built by the North Eastern Railway, and was designed by its architect William Bell. It is in brick with sandstone dressings, and has a roof of Welsh slate and asbestos. The station consists of two parallel goods sheds with offices at the west end. Along the sides of the goods sheds are windows with segmental heads. The offices have two storeys and four bays.	II
Former Holme Head Coffee Tavern and Reading Room; 54.88235°N 2.94017°W		1881	The building is octagonal, and in brick on a chamfered plinth, with dressings in calciferous sandstone, a band of decorative red tiles, and a hipped tile roof with half-timbered gables and a finial. Three are two storeys, double doors in a surround with a segmental head, and sash windows with shaped lintels.	II
Militia Store; 54.89729°N 2.94097°W	—	1881	The militia store, later used for other purposes, is in the inner bailey of Carlisle Castle. It is in sandstone on a chamfered plinth, and has a string course, a dentilled cornice, and a green slate roof with coped gables. It has two storeys and six bays. There are two doorways approached up steps, with segmental heads, and casement windows with iron frames. On the left return is a projection for the shaft of a manual lift.	II
33–39 Lonsdale Street; 54.89426°N 2.93088°W	—	1881–91	A row of four houses, later used for other purposes, in red brick on a chamfered plinth, with dressings in calciferous sandstone and Welsh slate roofs. They have two storeys, a double-depth plan, and rear outshuts. No. 39 has three bays, and the other houses have two bays each. Steps lead up to a prostyle Tuscan porch in each house. All the houses have a canted bay windows; in No. 33 it is in two storeys. In the upper floor are sash windows, some with eared architraves and keystones, and all houses have gabled dormers.	II
Red Gables; 54.89482°N 2.92828°W		1884–85	A house, later divided into flats, in glazed red brick on a moulded brick plinth, with dressings in red sandstone, decoration in terracotta tile, and a red tile roof. There are three storeys, it is asymmetrical with a front of three bays, and a return on Currie Street of four bays. The left bay on the front projects forward and is gabled. The other bays contain a triple-arched loggia above which is a balcony that extends round a two-storey bow window on the corner. The two bays on the right of the return are gabled. Most of the windows are cross-mullioned, and on both fronts are dormers.	II
Carlisle Public Markets; 54.8960°N 2.9364°W		1887–89	A covered market that was extended in 1900–01, it has walls of sandstone, and an interior and roof structure in wrought and cast iron and glass. There are three parallel ranges, the central range longer and angled, full street frontages on three sides, and a Renaissance-style entrance on the fourth side. The front on West Tower Street has two storeys, eight bays, a single-storey seven-bay extension on the front and an entrance flanked by Corinthian columns and with a pediment.	II
22 and 23 Chatsworth Square; 54.89540°N 2.92738°W	—	1889	A pair of red brick houses on a chamfered plinth in Gothic Revival style. They have dressings in calciferous sandstone, string courses, a dentilled cornice and a green slate roof. Both houses have two bays, the left bay having two storeys, and the right bay being gabled with three storeys. Each left bay contains a gabled porch, above which is a two-light sash window with a central colonnette, and over that is a box dormer. The right bays have two-storey canted bay windows, with mullioned and transomed windows in the ground floor and mullioned windows above. The bay window of No. 22 has a parapeted balcony. On the gables are beast finials.	II
42 and 44 Scotch Street; 54.89563°N 2.93566°W		1889	Also known as Tower Buildings, this consists of three shops with offices above, on a corner site, in Jacobean style. They are in sandstone with pilasters, string courses, a solid parapet, and a Welsh slate roof with decorative ridge tiles. There are 3 1/2 storeys and three bays on each front. In the ground floor are shop doors and windows, and in the upper floors are mullioned windows. In the centre of each front is a dormer with a shaped pediment, and on the corner is a round tower with a lead cupola.	II
St Andrew's Church; 54.89245°N 2.90076°W		1890	The church is built in local red brick and has a slate roof. It consists of a nave, a sanctuary with an apse, and a vestry. There is a tower at the liturgical west end incorporating a porch, with stepped buttresses and a bellcote with a gabled roof.	II
Church of Our Lady and St Joseph; 54.89380°N 2.92682°W		1891–93	A Roman Catholic church in sandstone with dressings in Bath stone and a green slate roof with decorative ridge tiles. It is in Perpendicular style. The church consists of a nave and chancel under one roof with a clerestory, aisles, a south porch, and a west tower. The tower has three stages, a west doorway in a pedimented porch, a battlemented parapet and a stair turret rising to a greater height. At the east end is a circular window.	II
22 Lowther Street and railings 54.89369°N 2.93295°W	—	1892	Offices in Gothic style, in polychrome sandstone on a chamfered plinth, with quoins, a moulded string course, a bracketed cornice, a Dutch gable with a leaf finial, and a slate roof. There are three storeys with a basement and an attic, and two bays. To the right is an arched doorway approached up steps with granite colonnettes and a fanlight. The windows are paired sashes with pointed arches. In front of the basement area are scrolled wrought iron railings.	II
County Hotel; 54.89169°N 2.93230°W		1894–96	The hotel, on a corner site, is in calciferous sandstone with string courses, a bracketed cornice and a green slate roof. There are three storeys with attics, 13 bays on Botchergate, a higher three-storey corner block, and two bays on The Crescent. In the ground floor are 20th-century shop windows separated by polished granite pilasters. The entrance is round-headed with granite pilasters and a fanlight, and above it is an oriel window. The other windows are sashes, and in the roof are pedimented dormers.	II
1 Castle Street and shop 54.89605°N 2.94018°W	—	Mid 1890s	A house and a shop on a semicircular corner site, in sandstone with a string course, modillions, and a hipped slate roof. There are two storeys and five bays. The shop front is divided into panels with rounded arches containing stained glass, and with a doorway, all flanked by pilasters. To the right is a doorway with a stone surround and a fanlight. In the upper floor are sash windows in moulded quoined surrounds.	II
17 Fisher Street; 54.89544°N 2.93670°W	—	1890s	This was originally the city treasurer's office, and has since been used for other purposes. It is in brick with a Welsh slate roof. The Fisher Street front has two storeys and three bays. A segmental archway leads through to a rear block of three storeys and ten bays. Most of the windows are sashes, with some casement windows on the Fisher Street front. Other features include a wooden oriel window, and doorways with fanlights.	II
Piers, wall and gates, Sands Sports Centre (south); 54.89883°N 2.93355°W	—	1895 (probable)	These were originally provided for the cattle market. There is a low sandstone wall with chamfered coping on which are cast iron railings. These have speared ball finials, and interval columns. Each pier has a moulded base, a square shaft with round moulded angles, and modillioned segmental capitals.	II
Piers, wall and gates, Sands Sports Centre (west); 54.89966°N 2.93530°W	—	1895 (probable)	These were originally provided for the cattle market, and have been set back from their original positions. There is a low sandstone wall with chamfered coping on which are cast iron railings. Each alternate rail has a speared ball finial, and there are interval columns. The piers are in sandstone, and each has a square shaft with round chamfered angles on a moulded plinth, and with modillioned segmental capitals.	II
St Gabriels' Court; 54.89543°N 2.92608°W	—	1896	A pair of semi-detached houses, later divided into flats, in brick with sandstone dressings, applied timber-framing, and a slate roof. They have two storeys with attics and a central doorway with a gabled porch. The outer bays project forward and are gabled. The inner bays contain two-storey canted bay windows, with gabled dormers above. Most of the windows are sashes, and some are mullioned.	II
Creighton Memorial; 54.89847°N 2.93473°W		1898	The memorial commemorates James Robert Creighton, a local politician. It was designed by C. J. Ferguson, and the sculptor was Léon-Joseph Chavalliaud. The memorial stands on a two-stepped plinth of sandstone, the rest of it being in lime-based artificial stone. On the plinth is a triangular podium with concave sides, the sides framed by balusters. On one side is a bronze relief of Creighton, and on the other sides are inscribed panels. In the upper part of the podium are scrolls, coats of arms, and consoles supporting a tall tapering column. At the top of the column is a foliated capital surmounted by a statue of St George and the Dragon.	II
St Aidan's Church; 54.89465°N 2.92049°W		1899–1902	The church, by C. J. Ferguson, is in sandstone on a chamfered plinth, with stepped buttresses, a string course, an eaves cornice, and solid parapets. The roof is in green slate with coped gables and cross finials. The roof consists of a nave and chancel under a continuous roof with a clerestory, aisles, a northeast vestry, and a south chapel. At the west end is a baptistry with a north and south porch, and on the gable is a double bellcote.	II
St Aidan's Church Hall; 54.89484°N 2.92036°W	—	1901	The church hall, designed by C. J. Ferguson in Perpendicular style, is in sandstone with quoins, and a green slate roof with coped gables. It has a single storey and six bays. The door has a stone surround and a carved lintel, and the windows are mullioned in chamfered stone surrounds.	II
Barn Close; 54.90532°N 2.93289°W	—	1902	A house in Arts and Crafts style designed by Norman Evill, it is roughcast with sandstones dressings and Lakeland slate roofs with sprocketed eaves. There are two storeys and a basement, and the plan is of three ranges around a courtyard, consisting of a living range, a service range, and a range for a stable and garage.	II
Statue of Queen Victoria; 54.89821°N 2.93855°W		1902	The statue stands in Bitts Park and was designed by Thomas Brock; the figure is in bronze and the rest of the memorial in unpolished granite. It consists of a moulded and chamfered plinth on steps, with a square shaft. On the sides of the shaft are bronze panels with relief panels, and on the shaft is the standing figure of Queen Victoria holding the orb and sceptre.	II
Crown and Mitre Hotel; 54.89461°N 2.93657°W		1903–05	The hotel has a ground floor of rusticated red sandstone, the upper floors are in brick, the dressings are in sandstone, and it has quoins, string courses, an eaves cornice, a balustraded parapet, and a green slate mansard roof. There are four storeys and eleven bays, the central and outer bays project forward and rise higher than the other bays and have shaped gables. The central doorway has a round arch, and is flanked by round-arched sidelights. Elsewhere on the ground floor are modern shop fronts. Above, the windows are mullioned and transomed. There is a first floor balustraded balcony with urn finials, above the doorway is a carved panel, and in the roof are dormers.	II
15 and 17 Lowther Street; 54.89282°N 2.93322°W		1904	A pair of shops flanking the entrance to Lowther Arcade, with offices above, they are in brick with dressings in calciferous sandstone, rusticated and alternate quoins, string courses, a modillioned cornice, and a mansard roof in Welsh slate with coped gables. There are three storeys and three bays. In the upper floors the windows have three lights, the central window in the middle floor is bowed, and above it is a carved inscribed panel. At the top of the building is an open pediment containing a keystone feature.	II
Turkish Suite; 54.88980°N 2.93469°W	—	1909	This was a Victorian-style Turkish bath added to the existing public baths. It is built in brick with slate roofs. Internally it consists of a series of interlinked rooms with basements. These are decorated with a scheme by Minton and Hollins consisting of tiling and glazed faience work.	II
Botcherby War Memorial; 54.89448°N 2.90591°W	—	1921	The war memorial is in a garden by a road junction. It is in grey granite and consists of a Latin cross on a roughhewn plinth on a two-stepped base. The front of the cross is decorated with knotwork and a carved sword and wreath in relief. The front of the plinth has been smoothed, and contains an inscription and the names of those lost in the First World War.	II
Christ Church War Memorial; 54.89453°N 2.92087°W	—	1921	The war memorial has been relocated to the churchyard of St Aidan's Church. It consists of a wooden gabled calvary on an octagonal stone plinth and an octagonal two-stepped base. On the plinth and the base is an inscription and the names of those lost in the First World War.	II
War memorial and railings 54.90281°N 2.92304°W		1921–22	The cenotaph in Rickerby Park was designed by Robert Lorimer, and is built in Shap granite ashlar. It has a platform with steps and a solid parapet, and consists of a tapering rectangular shaft with a chamfered base, a sub-cornice, and a carved-leaf frieze. The shaft has carvings, including regimental badges, and a bronze plaque to those who died in the Second World War. The area is surrounded by speared cast iron railings.	II*
Methodist Central Hall; 54.89598°N 2.93761°W		1922–23	The hall has a steel frame and is built in sandstone and brick, and has a Cumbrian slate roof with a ventilation lantern. Its plan consists of a central octagonal hall, a crush hall, and corridors, and these are flanked by two-storey wings with basements. The entrance front has a central section with a pediment carried on rusticated pilasters. On the ground floor are four arches with voussoirs and keystones containing two doorways with cornices and fanlights, and two windows. In the upper floor are four section divided by pilasters, each containing an oculus with festoons. The wings contain windows and side entrances with curved hoods.	II
Tuethur; 54.88792°N 2.94640°W	—	1923	A house designed by Robert Lorimer with wet-dashed walls on a brick plinth, and a hipped clay tile roof. The main part has two storeys and four bays, and there is a single-storey two-bay wing giving an L-shaped plan. On the front facing Empire Road are two canted bay windows with tile-hanging between the floors. The windows in the main part are casements. The wing has a flat roof, a parapet, a small circular window, and a large five-light window with a segment-headed arcade.	II
Wall and railings, Horse and Farrier public house 54.88765°N 2.96256°W	—	1924	The wall and railings were designed by Harry Redfern. The low wall is in sandstone with a chamfered coping. At the left is a square pier, there is a central gate and a side gate, and above the side gate is segmental-arched overthrow. The speared railings on the wall, and the gates are in wrought iron.	II
The Apple Tree; 54.89445°N 2.93387°W		1925	A public house designed by Harry Redfern. It is in brick with dressings in sandstone and terracotta, and has a roof of Lake District slate. The building has two storeys with attics and five bays, and has a U-shaped plan. The outer bays project forward and are gabled. The ground floor is faced with faience, and contains windows and doorways, surrounded by pilasters and a frieze. In the top floor are mullioned and transomed windows, and in the attic are three dormers.	II
Horse and Farrier Public House; 54.88765°N 2.96277°W		1928–29	A public house designed by Harry Redfern. It is stuccoed on a brick plinth and has a steeply pitched hipped tile roof. There are two storeys, three bays, and a rear extension giving an L-shaped plan. In the centre is a wooden porch and a doorway with a fanlight and sidelights. This is flanked by full-height canted bay windows rising to dormers under weatherboarded gables, and there are gabled half-dormers elsewhere. The windows are casements with a central round-arched feature.	II
Cumberland Inn; 54.89107°N 2.93147°W		1929–30	A public house designed by Harry Redfern in Gothic style. It is in sandstone and has coped gables. There are three storeys with an attic, and a symmetrical front of three bays. The outer bays contain doorways with four-centred arches, moulded surrounds, and traceried fanlights. In the central bay of the middle floor is a canted oriel window. The windows in the lower two storeys are mullioned and transomed, those in the top floor are mullioned, and in the gable is a lozenge-shaped attic window.	II
Railings and gates, Carlisle Cathedral; 54.89454°N 2.93796°W	—	1930	The gates and railings are at the east entrance to the cathedral grounds. They are in wrought iron, and are divided into seven panels, two of which form the gates. They are decorated with scrolls and floral motifs.	II
Alma Block; 54.89749°N 2.94187°W		1932	The block is in the outer bailey of Carlisle Castle. It was built as a recruit reception centre and canteen, and later used as a record office. The building is in brick on a plinth of chamfered red sandstone, and has quoins, a string course, and a cornice in calciferous sandstone. The roof is in green slate and has projecting modillioned eaves and gabled pediments. There are two storeys, seven bays, and a rear extension giving an L-shaped plan. The doorway has a pediment, and the windows are sashes in stone surrounds.	II
The Andalusian; 54.89261°N 2.93227°W		1932	The former public house was designed by Harry Redfern. It is faced with terracotta on a volcanic ashlar plinth, and has pilasters, an eaves cornice, and a green mansard roof. There are 2 1/2 storeys and seven bays. In the ground floor are three doorways, the outer ones with radial fanlights, and casement windows. The upper floor contains a three-bay recessed balcony with round arches on volcanic columns and scrolled railings. This is flanked by casement windows also with scrolled railings. Above are boxed and full dormers.	II
Gate piers and walls, Cumberland Infirmary; 54.89576°N 2.95469°W	—	Early 1930s (probable)	The gate piers are square and tall, they have stepped caps and urn finials, and between them is ornamental work in wrought iron. The flanking walls are in brick with dressings in calciferous sandstone, partly on a plinth, and with a stone cornice and coping. The wall to the right contains a pedestrian gateway, and the wall to the left is stepped to a lower level.	II
Magpie Inn Public House; 54.89276°N 2.90390°W		1933	The public house was designed by Harry Redfern in Vernacular Revival style. It is in brick on a brick plinth and has a tile roof, and has two storeys with attics. There is a central block flanked by two gabled wings, the right larger than the left, and containing a diamond-shaped window in the apex. There is applied timber-framing in the upper storey of the central block, and two gabled dormers above.	II
St Barnabas' Vicarage; 54.89304°N 2.96704°W	—	1935	The vicarage, designed by Fawcett Martindale, is in rendered brick and it has a Westmorland slate roof. There are two storeys, and the house has an H-shaped plan with a central block and flanking gabled wings with hipped roofs. In the centre the porch has three arches, forming a loggia. The windows are sashes, those in the ground floor having round heads.	II
St Barnabas' Church; 54.89319°N 2.96673°W		1935–36	Designed by Seely & Paget, the church is built in concrete with brick infill, it is rendered, and has a roof of Westmorland slate. The church consists of a nave, a west narthex, a chancel, vestries and offices at the southeast and northeast, and a south tower. The tower has a south doorway with a sandstone surround, above which is a round-headed lancet window, louvred bell openings, and a pyramidal cap. The nave has a mansard roof and contains two dormers.	II
Redfern Inn; 54.90719°N 2.95247°W		1939–40	A public house named after the architect Harry Redfern. It is built in brick on the ground floor, mostly tile-hung on the upper floor, and with red tile roofs. There are two storeys and a front of seven bays. On the front are two two-storey bay windows, two entrances with flat canopies with a three-light casement window between, three dormers with hipped gables, and a prominent tapering chimney stack. At the rear is a timber verandah with a balustrade.	II
Pillbox; 54.90501°N 2.93196°W		1940–41	The pillbox is disguised as a garden wall, and integrated into the wall, on a corner site. It is in red sandstone and brick with a concrete roof. The pillbox has a curved front facing the road containing three embrasures, and three straight faces at the rear.	II

== Notes and references ==
=== Sources ===
- Historic England, "Nos. 10 to 22 West Walls, incorporating city walls, Carlisle (1297278)", National Heritage List for England
- Historic England, "Inner Bailey: Keep, Carlisle (1208315)", National Heritage List for England
- Historic England, "Cathedral Church of the Holy and Undivided Trinity, Carlisle (1208430)", National Heritage List for England
- Historic England, "Captains Tower and Inner Bailey Walls, Carlisle (1297368)", National Heritage List for England
- Historic England, "Fragment of north City Walls adjoining south-east angle, Carlisle (1197001)", National Heritage List for England
- Historic England, "West City Walls, Carlisle (1197151)", National Heritage List for England
- Historic England, "West City Walls and Tile Tower adjoining at south-west, Carlisle (1197002)", National Heritage List for England
- Historic England, "Bridge over outer moat, Carlisle (1297365)", National Heritage List for England
- Historic England, "De Irebys Tower and outer bailey wall, Carlisle (1197000)", National Heritage List for England
- Historic England, "Former Priory wall and Deanery garden wall, Carlisle (1197014)", National Heritage List for England
- Historic England, "Ruins of Dormitory of former Priory of St Mary, Carlisle (1197011)", National Heritage List for England
- Historic England, "Fratry of former Priory of St Mary, Carlisle (1208468)", National Heritage List for England
- Historic England, "Inner Bailey: Palace Range including part of Queen Mary's Tower, Carlisle (1197007)", National Heritage List for England
- Historic England, "Nos. 5 and 6 Greenmarket, Carlisle (1210129)", National Heritage List for England
- Historic England, "The Deanery and Prior's Tower, Carlisle (1208577)", National Heritage List for England
- Historic England, "Tithe Barn, Carlisle (1218932)", National Heritage List for England
- Historic England, "Abbey Gate and Gatehouse, Carlisle (1208514)", National Heritage List for England
- Historic England, "Nisi Prius Courthouse, associated offices and gate arch, Carlisle (1196940)", National Heritage List for England
- Historic England, "Outer Bailey: Half-Moon Battery, Flanking Wall and Bridge, Carlisle (1197005)", National Heritage List for England
- Historic England, "No. 20 Wood Street, Carlisle (1197156)", National Heritage List for England
- Historic England, "Old Town Hall, Carlisle (1218104)", National Heritage List for England
- Historic England, "No. 2 The Abbey, Carlisle (1197013)", National Heritage List for England
- Historic England, "No. 1 The Abbey, Carlisle (1208557)", National Heritage List for England
- Historic England, "Nos. 3 and 6 The Abbey, Carlisle (1293105)", National Heritage List for England
- Historic England, "Eaglesfield House, Carlisle (1196982)", National Heritage List for England
- Historic England, "Wall, gates and railings in front of Tullie House, Carlisle (1196978)", National Heritage List for England
- Historic England, "Market Cross, Carlisle (1297369)", National Heritage List for England
- Historic England, "Tullie House and extensions, Carlisle (1297353)", National Heritage List for England
- Historic England, "Bishop's Registry, Carlisle (1197012)", National Heritage List for England
- Historic England, "Norman House and Norman Nook, Carlisle (1219005)", National Heritage List for England
- Historic England, "No. 48 Abbey Street, Carlisle (1208720)", National Heritage List for England
- Historic England, "Nos. 14 and 16 Castle Street, Carlisle (1196991)", National Heritage List for England
- Historic England, "Nos. 14, 16 and 18 Kells Place, Carlisle (1196920)", National Heritage List for England
- Historic England, "No. 3 Paternoster Row and adjacent outbuildings, Carlisle (1218264)", National Heritage List for England
- Historic England, "No. 18 Wood Street, Carlisle (1197155)", National Heritage List for England
- Historic England, "Holme Farmhouse, Carlisle (1297281)", National Heritage List for England
- Historic England, "The Sportsman Inn, Carlisle (1210153)", National Heritage List for England
- Historic England, "Nos. 4 to 16 St Alban's Row, Carlisle (1297398)", National Heritage List for England
- Historic England, "Church Farmhouse, associated railings and adjoining barn, Carlisle (1197115)", National Heritage List for England
- Historic England, "The Cottage and adjoining former stable, Carlisle (1219014)", National Heritage List for England
- Historic England, "Durranhill Lodge, Carlisle (1297349)", National Heritage List for England
- Historic England, "Morton Cottage, Nos. 210 to 212 Wigton Road, Carlisle (1297280)", National Heritage List for England
- Historic England, "No. 9 Fisher Street, Carlisle (1196950)", National Heritage List for England
- Historic England, "Nos. 13 and 15 Castle Street and No. 2 Paradise Court, Carlisle (1292899)", National Heritage List for England
- Historic England, "Nos. 3 and 4 Greenmarket, Carlisle (1196954)", National Heritage List for England
- Historic England, "No. 22 Wood Street, Carlisle (1219033)", National Heritage List for England
- Historic England, "Orchard House, Carlisle (1197116)", National Heritage List for England
- Historic England, "The Beeches and adjoining former barn or stable, Carlisle (1219024)", National Heritage List for England
- Historic England, "Bramerton and associated railings, Carlisle (1219036)", National Heritage List for England
- Historic England, "Nos. 17 and 19 Abbey Street, Carlisle (1196979)", National Heritage List for England
- Historic England, "No. 26 Abbey Street, Carlisle (1196981)", National Heritage List for England
- Historic England, "Nos. 28 and 30 Abbey Street, Carlisle (1208701)", National Heritage List for England
- Historic England, "No. 34 Abbey Street, Carlisle (1297356)", National Heritage List for England
- Historic England, "Nos. 6 to 12 Castle Street, Carlisle (1196990)", National Heritage List for England
- Historic England, "No. 21 Castle Street, Carlisle (1297358)", National Heritage List for England
- Historic England, "Nos. 77 to 83 Castle Street, No. 1 Greenmarket, Carlisle (1297359)", National Heritage List for England
- Historic England, "No. 11 English Street, Carlisle (1209754)", National Heritage List for England
- Historic England, "No. 18 Fisher Street, Carlisle (1196951)", National Heritage List for England
- Historic England, "No. 92 Newtown Road, Carlisle (1218220)", National Heritage List for England
- Historic England, "No. 7 Paternoster Row, Carlisle (1196935)", National Heritage List for England
- Historic England, "Nos. 36, 38 and 40 Scotch Street, Carlisle (1218649)", National Heritage List for England
- Historic England, "No. 60 Scotch Street, Carlisle (1291847)", National Heritage List for England
- Historic England, "No. 70 Scotch Street, Carlisle (1196913)", National Heritage List for England
- Historic England, "The Boardroom Public House, Carlisle (1196992)", National Heritage List for England
- Historic England, "Botcherby House, Carlisle (1218982)", National Heritage List for England
- Historic England, "Barn to north-west of Durranhill Lodge, Carlisle (1292505)", National Heritage List for England
- Historic England, "Herbert Atkinson House, Carlisle (1196977)", National Heritage List for England
- Historic England, "Mulcaster House, Carlisle (1196986)", National Heritage List for England
- Historic England, "The Pheasant Inn, Carlisle (1209553)", National Heritage List for England
- Historic England, "Suttle House, Carlisle (1218967)", National Heritage List for England
- Historic England, "No. 23 Fisher Street, Carlisle (1196952)", National Heritage List for England
- Historic England, "Nos. 31 to 37 Fisher Street, Carlisle (1292353)", National Heritage List for England
- Historic England, "Church of St Cuthbert with St Mary, Carlisle (1218565)", National Heritage List for England
- Historic England, "No. 17 Castle Street, Carlisle (1208982)", National Heritage List for England
- Historic England, "No. 19 Castle Street, Carlisle (1025283)", National Heritage List for England
- Historic England, "Nos. 1 and 2 Abbey Street, Carlisle (1196976)", National Heritage List for England
- Historic England, "Nos. 19 and 21 Fisher Street, Carlisle (1292379)", National Heritage List for England
- Historic England, "Nos. 103 and 105 Lowther Street and Howard Arms Public House, Carlisle (1218034)", National Heritage List for England
- Historic England, "11 Fisher Street, Carlisle (1292334)", National Heritage List for England
- Historic England, "Outer Bailey: Arnhem Block, Carlisle (1197003)", National Heritage List for England
- Historic England, "Outer Bailey: Arroyo Block, Gym and Regimental Association Club, Carlisle (1297367)", National Heritage List for England
- Historic England, "St Ann's, Carlisle (1196944)", National Heritage List for England
- Historic England, "The Old Vicarage, Carlisle (1196967)", National Heritage List for England
- Historic England, "Coledale Hall, Carlisle (1196932)", National Heritage List for England
- Historic England, "Crown Court, adjoining offices and gate arch, Carlisle (1196939)", National Heritage List for England
- Historic England, "Durranhill House, Carlisle (1292498)", National Heritage List for England
- Historic England, "Eden Bridge, Carlisle (1297364)", National Heritage List for England
- Historic England, "Little Bank, Carlisle (1196984)", National Heritage List for England
- Historic England, "No. 32 Abbey Street, Carlisle (1293020)", National Heritage List for England
- Historic England, "Hyssop Holme Well, Carlisle (1196993)", National Heritage List for England
- Historic England, "Milestone east of No. 325 Kingstown Road, Carlisle (1196921)", National Heritage List for England
- Historic England, "Nos. 1 to 9 The Crescent, Carlisle (1291802)", National Heritage List for England
- Historic England, "Nos. 20 to 28 Scotch Street, No. 1 West Tower Street, Carlisle (1291867)", National Heritage List for England
- Historic England, "Nos. 26, 28 and 30 Castle Street and railings to front, Carlisle (1355058)", National Heritage List for England
- Historic England, "Nos. 2 to 9 Chapel Street, Carlisle (1196957)", National Heritage List for England
- Historic England, "Gaol wall, west of Crown Court, Carlisle (1196983)", National Heritage List for England
- Historic England, "Hospital Wing of County Gaol and Gaol Wall, Carlisle (1196941)", National Heritage List for England
- Historic England, "Gates and lamp bracket to east of Church of St Cuthbert with St Mary, Carlisle (1196910)", National Heritage List for England
- Historic England, "Nos. 18, 20 and 22 Abbey Street, Carlisle (1196980)", National Heritage List for England
- Historic England, "No. 24 Abbey Street, Carlisle (1297355)", National Heritage List for England
- Historic England, "Nos. 36 and 38 Abbey Street, Carlisle (1208715)", National Heritage List for England
- Historic England, "Nos. 13 and 15 English Street, Carlisle (1196975)", National Heritage List for England
- Historic England, "No. 1 Fisher Street, Carlisle (1209979)", National Heritage List for England
- Historic England, "Nos. 4, 6 and 8 Fisher Street, Carlisle (1292362)", National Heritage List for England
- Historic England, "Nos. 3 and 5 Fisher Street, Carlisle (1297378)", National Heritage List for England
- Historic England, "No. 20 Fisher Street, Carlisle (1297379)", National Heritage List for England
- Historic England, "No. 22 Fisher Street, Carlisle (1210040)", National Heritage List for England
- Historic England, "No. 34 Fisher Street, Carlisle (1210063)", National Heritage List for England
- Historic England, "No. 2 Greenmarket, Carlisle (1210127)", National Heritage List for England
- Historic England, "No. 6 Paternoster Row, Carlisle (1218268)", National Heritage List for England
- Historic England, "No. 17 Scotch Street, Carlisle (1291901)", National Heritage List for England
- Historic England, "No. 34 Scotch Street, Carlisle (1297400)", National Heritage List for England
- Historic England, "Nos. 46 and 48 Scotch Street, Carlisle (1291840)", National Heritage List for England
- Historic England, "No. 38 St Nicholas Street, Carlisle (1218637)", National Heritage List for England
- Historic England, "No. 43 West Walls, Carlisle (1291734)", National Heritage List for England
- Historic England, "Nos. 32 and 34 Wood Street, Carlisle (1291649)", National Heritage List for England
- Historic England, "Abbey Court, Carlisle (1196934)", National Heritage List for England
- Historic England, "Ashleigh House, railings and adjoining garage, Carlisle (1297283)", National Heritage List for England
- Historic England, "Boundary stone outside No.431 London Road, Carlisle (1217855)", National Heritage List for England
- Historic England, "Bramerton Lodge and associated railings, Carlisle (1219051)", National Heritage List for England
- Historic England, "The County Hotel (part) and the Caledonian Public House, Carlisle (1208808)", National Heritage List for England
- Historic England, "Church House, Carlisle (1197150)", National Heritage List for England
- Historic England, "Currock House Community Centre, Carlisle (1196923)", National Heritage List for England
- Historic England, "The Golden Lion Public House, Carlisle (1291894)", National Heritage List for England
- Historic England, "Milestone outside No. 405 London Road, Carlisle (1196926)", National Heritage List for England
- Historic England, "Milestone outside Suttle House, Carlisle (1197153)", National Heritage List for England
- Historic England, "Morton Community Centre, Carlisle (1291709)", National Heritage List for England
- Historic England, "Stanwix House, Carlisle (1196968)", National Heritage List for England
- Historic England, "Gates, piers and overthrow at entrance drive to The Old Vicarage, Carlisle (1292561)", National Heritage List for England
- Historic England, "St Nicholas Arms Public House, Carlisle (1297405)", National Heritage List for England
- Historic England, "The Grange and associated railings, Stable Croft and adjoining barn, Carlisle (1297282)", National Heritage List for England
- Historic England, "Theakston's Carlisle Brewery (1208869)", National Heritage List for England
- Historic England, "Inner Bailey: Magazine, Carlisle (1197006)", National Heritage List for England
- Historic England, "Crozier Lodge, Cumberland Infirmary, Carlisle (1297371)", National Heritage List for England
- Historic England, "Outer Bailey: Gallipoli Block, Carlisle (1197004)", National Heritage List for England
- Historic England, "Petteril Bank, Carlisle (1297373)", National Heritage List for England
- Historic England, "Nos. 30 to 40 Lowther Street, 1 Lonsdale Street including railings to front, Carlisle (1292188)", National Heritage List for England
- Historic England, "The Lodge, Carlisle (1217845)", National Heritage List for England
- Historic England, "Cumberland Infirmary, Carlisle (1218237)", National Heritage List for England
- Historic England, "Nos. 1 to 9 Devonshire Terrace, Carlisle (1196971)", National Heritage List for England
- Historic England, "Cavendish House, Carlisle (1297275)", National Heritage List for England
- Historic England, "Diocesan Church Centre, Carlisle (1218930)", National Heritage List for England
- Historic England, "Outer Bailey: Garrison Cells and Custodian's Office, Carlisle (1293243)", National Heritage List for England
- Historic England, "St Cuthbert's Vicarage and associated railings, Carlisle (1297279)", National Heritage List for England
- Historic England, "Liberal Club, Carlisle (1297408)", National Heritage List for England
- Historic England, "Nos. 1 to 13 Devonshire Street, 29 Lowther Street, Carlisle (1292521)", National Heritage List for England
- Historic England, "No. 1 Earl Street, Carlisle (1196972)", National Heritage List for England
- Historic England, "No. 9 Earl Street, Carlisle (1196973)", National Heritage List for England
- Historic England, "No. 11 Earl Street, Carlisle (1209731)", National Heritage List for England
- Historic England, "No. 2 Etterby Close, Carlisle (1245330)", National Heritage List for England
- Historic England, "No. 10 Etterby Street, Carlisle (1196945)", National Heritage List for England
- Historic England, "No. 12 Etterby Street, Carlisle (1209908)", National Heritage List for England
- Historic England, "Nos. 14 and 16 Etterby Street, Carlisle (1196946)", National Heritage List for England
- Historic England, "Nos. 18 and 20 Etterby Street, Carlisle (1209959)", National Heritage List for England
- Historic England, "Nos. 22 and 24 Etterby Street, Carlisle (1196947)", National Heritage List for England
- Historic England, "Nos. 26 to 36 Etterby Street, Carlisle (1209960)", National Heritage List for England
- Historic England, "Nos. 38, 40 and 42 Etterby Street, Carlisle (1297376)", National Heritage List for England
- Historic England, "Nos. 44 to 50 Etterby Street, Carlisle (1209966)", National Heritage List for England
- Historic England, "Nos. 54 to 60 Etterby Street, Carlisle (1209971)", National Heritage List for England
- Historic England, "Nos. 60 to 70 Etterby Street, Carlisle (1297377)", National Heritage List for England
- Historic England, "Nos. 24 and 26 Lowther Street including railings to front, Carlisle (1217914)", National Heritage List for England
- Historic England, "Nos. 11 to 29 Warwick Road, Carlisle (1197142)", National Heritage List for England
- Historic England, "Nos. 63 to 69 Warwick Road, Carlisle (1197144)", National Heritage List for England
- Historic England, "Nos. 85 to 93 Warwick Road, Carlisle (1291754)", National Heritage List for England
- Historic England, "Nos. 21, 23 and 25 English Street, Carlisle (1297374)", National Heritage List for England
- Historic England, "Mayfield and associated railings, Carlisle (1197154)", National Heritage List for England
- Historic England, "Tollund House, Carlisle (1297352)", National Heritage List for England
- Historic England, "Shaddon Mill, Carlisle (1297383)", National Heritage List for England
- Historic England, "Dixon's Chimney at Shaddon Mill, Carlisle (1196919)", National Heritage List for England
- Historic England, "Outer Bailey: Ypres Block, Carlisle (1208301)", National Heritage List for England
- Historic England, "The Railway Inn, Carlisle (1196925)", National Heritage List for England
- Historic England, "Nos. 37 and 39 Lowther Street including overthrow and lamp bracket, Carlisle (1218009)", National Heritage List for England
- Historic England, "Nos. 38 to 48 Scotland Road, Carlisle (1297401)", National Heritage List for England
- Historic England, "No. 1 Victoria Place, Carlisle (1196918)", National Heritage List for England
- Historic England, "No. 2 Victoria Place, Carlisle (1218796)", National Heritage List for England
- Historic England, "No. 73 Warwick Road, Carlisle (1197145)", National Heritage List for England
- Historic England, "Nos. 75 to 79 Warwick Road, Carlisle (1218885)", National Heritage List for England
- Historic England, "Trustee Savings Bank and attached railings, Carlisle (1196930)", National Heritage List for England
- Historic England, "The Turf Inn, Carlisle (1218199)", National Heritage List for England
- Historic England, "Nos. 3, 5 and 7 Earl Street, Carlisle (1292508)", National Heritage List for England
- Historic England, "Nos. 4, 6 and 6A Lowther Street, Carlisle (1196927)", National Heritage List for England
- Historic England, "No. 52 Etterby Road, Carlisle (1196948)", National Heritage List for England
- Historic England, "Nos. 4, 6 and 6A Lowther Street, Carlisle (1196927)", National Heritage List for England
- Historic England, "Nos. 35 to 43 Victoria Road, Carlisle (1197140)", National Heritage List for England
- Historic England, "Nos. 99, 101 and 103 Warwick Road, Carlisle (1218891)", National Heritage List for England
- Historic England, "City boundary stone at NY 3993 5645, Carlisle (1197149)", National Heritage List for England
- Historic England, "The Cranemaker Public House, Carlisle (1196924)", National Heritage List for England
- Historic England, "Church of St Michael, Carlisle (1209583)", National Heritage List for England
- Historic England, "Congregational Church, Carlisle (1196929)", National Heritage List for England
- Historic England, "Statue of Francis Aglionby, Carlisle (1417583)", National Heritage List for England
- Historic England, "No. 3 Castle Street, Carlisle (1208937)", National Heritage List for England
- Historic England, "Nos. 5 to 29 Chiswick Street and No. 1 Currie Street, Carlisle (1292594)", National Heritage List for England
- Historic England, "Nos. 1 to 8 Eden Mount and No. 1 Cromwell Crescent, Carlisle (1209736)", National Heritage List for England
- Historic England, "No. 9 Eden Mount, Carlisle (1196974)", National Heritage List for England
- Historic England, "Nos. 6 and 8 Etterby Street, Carlisle (1209903)", National Heritage List for England
- Historic England, "Nos. 72 to 80 Etterby Street, Carlisle (1292394)", National Heritage List for England
- Historic England, "Nos. 82 and 84 Etterby Street, Carlisle (1196949)", National Heritage List for England
- Historic England, "Nos. 5 to 61 St Nicholas Street, Carlisle (1196911)", National Heritage List for England
- Historic England, "No. 71 Warwick Road, Carlisle (1218882)", National Heritage List for England
- Historic England, "Nos. 95 and 97 Warwick Road including railings to front, Carlisle (1197146)", National Heritage List for England
- Historic England, "Nos. 113 and 115 Warwick Road, Carlisle (1197147)", National Heritage List for England
- Historic England, "Caledonian Mill, Carlisle (1292994)", National Heritage List for England
- Historic England, "Newtown House, Carlisle (1218228)", National Heritage List for England
- Historic England, "Statue of Earl of Lonsdale, Carlisle (1297404)", National Heritage List for England
- Historic England, "Citadel Station, Carlisle (1196969)", National Heritage List for England
- Historic England, "Nos. 5 to 33 Spencer Street and Nos. 1 and 3 Chiswick Street, Carlisle (1297402)", National Heritage List for England
- Historic England, "Nos. 3 to 17 Victoria Place, Carlisle (1197136)", National Heritage List for England
- Historic England, "No. 61 Warwick Road and No. 51 Spencer Street, Carlisle (1197143)", National Heritage List for England
- Historic England, "Midland Bank, including railings, Carlisle (1196938)", National Heritage List for England
- Historic England, "Nos. 2 and 4 Hartington Place, Carlisle (1210142)", National Heritage List for England
- Historic England, "Nos. 35 to 49 Spencer Street and No. 2 Chiswick Street, Carlisle (1196915)", National Heritage List for England
- Historic England, "Nos. 1, 2 and 3 Stanwix Bank, Carlisle (1218736)", National Heritage List for England
- Historic England, "Cumbria College of Art and Design - Homeacres, Carlisle (1208815)", National Heritage List for England
- Historic England, "Holme Head House, Carlisle (1197008)", National Heritage List for England
- Historic England, "Offices of North West Water Limited, Carlisle (1208371)", National Heritage List for England
- Historic England, "Cavendish Hill, Carlisle (1208990)", National Heritage List for England
- Historic England, "Nos. 5 to 51 Bank Street, No. 45 Lowther Street and No. 1 Lowthian Lane, Carlisle (1208743)", National Heritage List for England
- Historic England, "Nos. 28 to 34 Eden Street, Carlisle (1292475)", National Heritage List for England
- Historic England, "Nos. 1 to 21 Tait Street, Carlisle (1196916)", National Heritage List for England
- Historic England, "Nos. 10 to 30 Tait Street and No. 1 James Terrace, Carlisle (1297403)", National Heritage List for England
- Historic England, "Nos. 25, 27 and 29 Tait Street, Carlisle (1218743)", National Heritage List for England
- Historic England, "Nos. 32, 34 and 36 Tait Street, Carlisle (1196917)", National Heritage List for England
- Historic England, "Ex-Serviceman's Club, Carlisle (1197138)", National Heritage List for England
- Historic England, "Nos. 36 to 46 Victoria Place, Carlisle (1197139)", National Heritage List for England
- Historic England, "Nos. 1 to 11 Woodrouffe Terrace, Carlisle (1197117)", National Heritage List for England
- Historic England, "Nos. 2 to 22 Bridge Terrace, Carlisle (1196987)", National Heritage List for England
- Historic England, "The Cumbrian Hotel, Carlisle (1209676)", National Heritage List for England
- Historic England, "Milbourne Arms Public House, Carlisle (1196931)", National Heritage List for England
- Historic England, "Nos. 4 to 18 Victoria Place and No. 2 Albert Street, Carlisle (1297274)", National Heritage List for England
- Historic England, "Lloyds Bank, Carlisle (1292237)", National Heritage List for England
- Historic England, "Nos. 2 and 4 Devonshire Street and Nos. 69, 71 and 73 English Street, Carlisle (1297388)", National Heritage List for England
- Historic England, "Cumbria College of Art and Design - The Cottage and Homeacres Cottage, Carlisle (1196985)", National Heritage List for England
- Historic England, "Nos. 1, 2 and 3 Etterby Scaur, Carlisle (1196943)", National Heritage List for England
- Historic England, "No. 109 Warwick Road, Carlisle (1297276)", National Heritage List for England
- Historic England, "Offices of North West Water Ltd (former factory), Carlisle (1208391)", National Heritage List for England
- Historic England, "No. 153 Richardson Street and Carlisle Cemetery Office (1196908)", National Heritage List for England
- Historic England, "Carlisle Cemetery Chapel (1196907)", National Heritage List for England
- Historic England, "Gates and gate piers to east of West Lodge, Carlisle Cemetery (1196970)", National Heritage List for England
- Historic England, "Mortuary Chapel (disused), Carlisle (1218426)", National Heritage List for England
- Historic England, "West Lodge, Carlisle Cemetery (1209679)", National Heritage List for England
- Historic England, "Monument to Peter Nicholson north-west of Cemetery Chapel, Carlisle (1218406)", National Heritage List for England
- Historic England, "Monument to Dean Tait's children to south of Church of St Michael, Carlisle (1196966)", National Heritage List for England
- Historic England, "Dispensary, Carlisle (1196958)", National Heritage List for England
- Historic England, "Nos. 21 and 22 Portland Square and No. 4 Wilfrid Street, Carlisle (1297395)", National Heritage List for England
- Historic England, "Nos. 117, 119 and 121 Warwick Road, Carlisle (1291718)", National Heritage List for England
- Historic England, "Statue of James Steel, Carlisle (1196942)", National Heritage List for England
- Historic England, "No. 4 The Abbey, Carlisle (1297329)", National Heritage List for England
- Historic England, "Nos. 49 and 51 Chiswick Street and Nos. 1 and 1A Hartington Place, Carlisle (1196965)", National Heritage List for England
- Historic England, "Nos. 6 to 20 Hartington Place, Carlisle (1210150)", National Heritage List for England
- Historic England, "Nos. 2 and 4 Howard Place, Carlisle (1292288)", National Heritage List for England
- Historic England, "No. 28 Portland Square and Nos. 6 and 8 Brunswick Street, Carlisle (1297396)", National Heritage List for England
- Historic England, "Nos. 105 and 107 Warwick Road, Carlisle (1218895)", National Heritage List for England
- Historic England, "Kingdom Hall of Jehovah's Witnesses, Carlisle (1297384)", National Heritage List for England
- Historic England, "Waverley Viaduct, west of the former Electricity Works, Carlisle (1291680)", National Heritage List for England
- Historic England, "No. 13 Earl Street, Carlisle (1297350)", National Heritage List for England
- Historic England, "Church of St George and attached manse, Carlisle (1421406)", National Heritage List for England
- Historic England, "No. 8 Lowther Street, Carlisle (1218057)", National Heritage List for England
- Historic England, "Skiddaw Building, Carlisle (1196953)", National Heritage List for England
- Historic England, "City Maternity Hospital, Carlisle (1210121)", National Heritage List for England
- Historic England, "No. 27 Portland Square, Carlisle (1196906)", National Heritage List for England
- Historic England, "Nos. 33 and 35 Chiswick Street and No. 2 Currie Street, Carlisle (1196964)", National Heritage List for England
- Historic England, "Nos. 12, 14 and 16 Devonshire Street, Carlisle (1292525)", National Heritage List for England
- Historic England, "No. 111 Warwick Road, Carlisle (1218898)", National Heritage List for England
- Historic England, "Devonshire Chambers, Carlisle (1209682)", National Heritage List for England
- Historic England, "The Mill at Holme Head Works, Carlisle (1197009)", National Heritage List for England
- Historic England, "Midland Bank, Carlisle (1297387)", National Heritage List for England
- Historic England, "Church of St James, Carlisle (1297399)", National Heritage List for England
- Historic England, "The County Bar and the Cumbrian Bar (part), Carlisle (1208798)", National Heritage List for England
- Historic England, "No. 1 Howard Place, Carlisle (1297382)", National Heritage List for England
- Historic England, "Nos. 10, 12 and 14 Lowther Street, Carlisle (1217895)", National Heritage List for England
- Historic England, "Nos. 18 and 20 Chiswick Street, Carlisle (1292597)", National Heritage List for England
- Historic England, "Church of St Paul, Carlisle (1217889)", National Heritage List for England
- Historic England, "Chatsworth House, Carlisle (1297385)", National Heritage List for England
- Historic England, "Wall and railings around central gardens, Portland Square, Carlisle (1291976)", National Heritage List for England
- Historic England, "Nos. 4 to 12 Chiswick Street, Carlisle (1196961)", National Heritage List for England
- Historic England, "Nos. 14 and 16 Chiswick Street with gate piers to front, Carlisle (1196962)", National Heritage List for England
- Historic England, "No. 22 Chiswick Street, Carlisle (1196963)", National Heritage List for England
- Historic England, "Nos. 24 and 26 Chiswick Street, Carlisle (1209529)", National Heritage List for England
- Historic England, "Nos. 35 to 47 Chiswick Street, Carlisle (1209537)", National Heritage List for England
- Historic England, "Nos. 22 and 24 Hartington Place, Carlisle (1196955)", National Heritage List for England
- Historic England, "Nos. 1 to 5 Portland Square, 3 Brunswick Street and 4 Albert Street, Carlisle (1292044)", National Heritage List for England
- Historic England, "Nos. 6 and 7 Portland Square, Carlisle (1196936)", National Heritage List for England
- Historic England, "Nos. 8 and 9 Portland Square, Carlisle (1292013)", National Heritage List for England
- Historic England, "No. 23 Portland Square and No. 3 Wilfred Street, Carlisle (1196905)", National Heritage List for England
- Historic England, "Nos. 50 and 52 Scotland Road, Carlisle (1196914)", National Heritage List for England
- Historic England, "Outer Bailey: Officers' Mess, Carlisle (1208359)", National Heritage List for England
- Historic England, "Nos. 2 and 4 Spencer Street, Carlisle (1291829)", National Heritage List for England
- Historic England, "Nos. 28, 30 and 32 Bank Street, Carlisle (1208765)", National Heritage List for England
- Historic England, "Clydesdale Bank, Carlisle Gas Works (1297357)", National Heritage List for England
- Historic England, "No. 4 gasholder, Carlisle Gas Works (1196909)", National Heritage List for England
- Historic England, "Detached west wall of Citadel Station, Carlisle Gas Works (1209674)", National Heritage List for England
- Historic England, "Nos. 16 to 19 Portland Square, Carlisle (1297394)", National Heritage List for England
- Historic England, "No. 20 Portland Square and No. 5 Brunswick Street, Carlisle (1196904)", National Heritage List for England
- Historic England, "Central Plaza Hotel and stable range, with the west city walls behind, Carlisle (1197141)", National Heritage List for England
- Historic England, "Monument to Daniel Clark and associated railings, Carlisle (1297397)", National Heritage List for England
- Historic England, "No. 15 Portland Square, Carlisle (1196903)", National Heritage List for England
- Historic England, "Former Holme Head Coffee Tavern and Reading Room, Carlisle (1196933)", National Heritage List for England
- Historic England, "Inner Bailey: Militia Store, Carlisle (1293187)", National Heritage List for England
- Historic England, "Nos. 33 to 39 Lonsdale Street, Carlisle (1217857)", National Heritage List for England
- Historic England, "Nos. 43 to 51 Scotland Road, Carlisle (1218693)", National Heritage List for England
- Historic England, "Larch House, Carlisle (1208921)", National Heritage List for England
- Historic England, "Nos. 3, 5 and 7 Hartington Place and No. 20 Chatsworth Square, Carlisle (1297381)", National Heritage List for England
- Historic England, "Nos. 6 to 26 Spencer Street, Carlisle (1291832)", National Heritage List for England
- Historic England, "Nos. 19, 21 and 23 Victoria Place, Carlisle (1197137)", National Heritage List for England
- Historic England, "Arkle House, Carlisle (1297406)", National Heritage List for England
- Historic England, "Nos. 1, 3 and 5 Albert Street North, Carlisle (1208730)", National Heritage List for England
- Historic England, "Wall, railings and gates around central gardens, Chatsworth Square, Carlisle (1297386)", National Heritage List for England
- Historic England, "No. 10 Portland Square with railings, Carlisle (1196937)", National Heritage List for England
- Historic England, "Nos. 11 to 14 Portland Square including railings to Nos. 13 and 14, Carlisle (1196902)", National Heritage List for England
- Historic England, "No. 15A Abbey Street, Carlisle (1297354)", National Heritage List for England
- Historic England, "No. 15 Portland Square, Carlisle (1196903)", National Heritage List for England
- Historic England, "London Road NER Goods Station, Carlisle (1430159)", National Heritage List for England
- Historic England, "Nos. 50 and 52 Scotland Road, Carlisle (1196914)", National Heritage List for England
- Historic England, "Barclays Bank and Bank Chambers, Carlisle (1297375)", National Heritage List for England
- Historic England, "Monument to George Head Head to south-west of Church of St Michael, Carlisle (1209595)", National Heritage List for England
- Historic England, "Red Gables, Carlisle (1196959)", National Heritage List for England
- Historic England, "Carlisle Public Markets (1297380)", National Heritage List for England
- Historic England, "Nos. 22 and 24 Chatsworth Square, Carlisle (1196960)", National Heritage List for England
- Historic England, "Nos. 42 and 44 Scotch Street, Carlisle (1196912)", National Heritage List for England
- Historic England, "Church of St Andrew, Carlisle (1413631)", National Heritage List for England
- Historic England, "Church of Our Lady and St Joseph, Carlisle (1197148)", National Heritage List for England
- Historic England, "No. 22 Lowther Street including railings at front, Carlisle (1196928)", National Heritage List for England
- Historic England, "County Hotel, Carlisle (1208782)", National Heritage List for England
- Historic England, "No. 1 Castle Street including integral shop, Carlisle (1196989)", National Heritage List for England
- Historic England, "No. 22 Lowther Street including railings at front, Carlisle (1196928)", National Heritage List for England
- Historic England, "No. 17 Fisher Street, Carlisle (1210006)", National Heritage List for England
- Historic England, "Piers, wall and railings to south of the Sands Sports Centre, Carlisle (1297370)", National Heritage List for England
- Historic England, "Wall, railings and piers to west of the Sands Sports Centre, Carlisle (1292909)", National Heritage List for England
- Historic England, "St Gabriel's Court, Carlisle (1389127)", National Heritage List for England
- Historic England, "Creighton Memorial, Carlisle (1408781)", National Heritage List for England
- Historic England, "Church of St Aidan, Carlisle (1218914)", National Heritage List for England
- Historic England, "St Aidan's Church Hall, Carlisle (1297277)", National Heritage List for England
- Historic England, "Barn Close, Carlisle (1482024)", National Heritage List for England
- Historic England, "Statue of Queen Victoria, Carlisle (1218785)", National Heritage List for England
- Historic England, "Crown and Mitre Hotel, Carlisle (1297351)", National Heritage List for England
- Historic England, "Nos. 15 and 17 Lowther Street, Carlisle (1297407)", National Heritage List for England
- Historic England, "Turkish Suite, The Pools, Carlisle (1393755)", National Heritage List for England
- Historic England, "Botcherby War Memorial, Carlisle (1458474)", National Heritage List for England
- Historic England, "Christ Church War Memorial, Carlisle (1458500)", National Heritage List for England
- Historic England, "Cumberland and Westmorland Joint Counties' War Memorial, Carlisle (1291971)", National Heritage List for England
- Historic England, "Methodist Central Hall, Carlisle (1392920)", National Heritage List for England
- Historic England, "Tuethur, Carlisle (1218603)", National Heritage List for England
- Historic England, "Wall and railings in front of Horse and Farrier Public House, Carlisle (1197152)", National Heritage List for England
- Historic England, "The Apple Tree, Carlisle (1119685)", National Heritage List for England
- Historic England, "Horse and Farrier Public House, Carlisle (1218944)", National Heritage List for England
- Historic England, "Cumberland Inn, Carlisle (1380211)", National Heritage List for England
- Historic England, "Railings and gates at east end of Cathedral, Carlisle (1197010)", National Heritage List for England
- Historic England, "Outer Bailey: Alma Block, Carlisle (1297366)", National Heritage List for England
- Historic England, "The Andalusian, Carlisle (1291729)", National Heritage List for England
- Historic England, "Entrance gate piers and wall to east of Cumberland Infirmary, Carlisle (1196956)", National Heritage List for England
- Historic England, "Magpie Inn Public House, Carlisle (1404909)", National Heritage List for England
- Historic England, "St Barnabas Vicarage, Carlisle (1208913)", National Heritage List for England
- Historic England, "Church of St Barnabas, Carlisle (1196988)", National Heritage List for England
- Historic England, "The Redfern Public House, Carlisle (1380323)", National Heritage List for England
- Historic England, "Pillbox at Brampton Road, Carlisle (1466559)", National Heritage List for England
- Historic England, Listed Buildings
- Hyde, Matthew; Pevsner, Nikolaus (2010) [1967], Cumbria, The Buildings of England, New Haven and London: Yale University Press, ISBN 978-0-300-12663-1
