= Sir George Fleming, 2nd Baronet =

British churchman

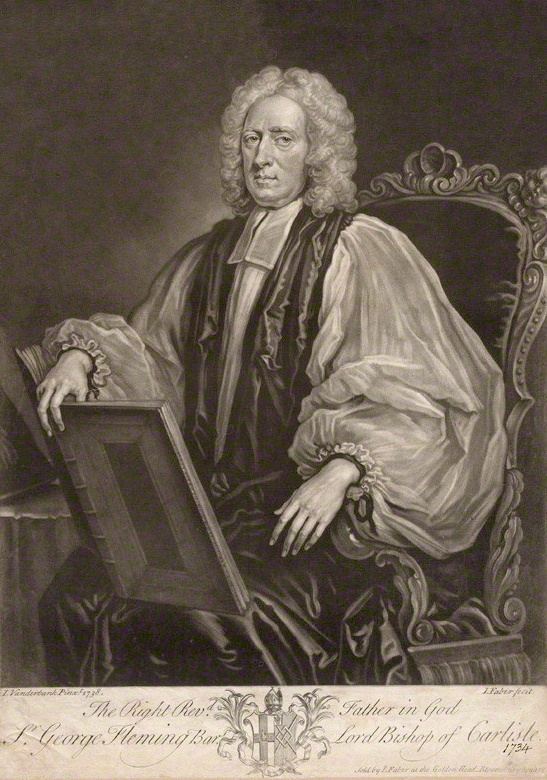
- Bishop Fleming
- Born: 1667
- Died: 2 July 1747 (aged 79–80)
- Education: Sedbergh School, St Edmund Hall, Oxford
- Occupation: churchman
- Known for: Canon, Archdeacon, Dean, Bishop of Carlisle
- Father: Sir Daniel Le Fleming

Sir George Fleming, 2nd Baronet (1667 – 2 July 1747) was a British churchman.

A member of the old Westmorland family, Fleming was the fifth son of Sir Daniel Le Fleming of Rydal Hall. Along with his three brothers, he was educated at Sedbergh School. From Sedbergh, he progressed to St Edmund Hall, Oxford in 1688. He became Canon of Carlisle Cathedral in 1700, Archdeacon of Carlisle in 1705, Dean in 1727 and finally Bishop of Carlisle in 1734. He succeeded as 2nd baronet in 1736. A successor, the Revd Sir Richard Le Fleming Bt, became rector of both Windermere and Grasmere and gave William Wordsworth a home at Rydal Mount.

Before moving to Rydal Hall, the Le Fleming family lived at Coniston Hall, which is now owned by the National Trust.

Church of England titles
Preceded by John Waugh	Bishop of Carlisle; 1734–1747	Succeeded by Richard Osbaldeston
Preceded by Thomas Tullie	Dean of Carlisle; 1727–1735	Succeeded by Robert Bolton
Baronetage of England
Preceded by William Fleming	Baronet (of Rydal); 1736–1747	Succeeded by William Fleming
