= Frances Bowes-Lyon, Countess of Strathmore and Kinghorne =

British noblewoman (1832–1922)

The Right Honourable The Countess of Strathmore and Kinghorne
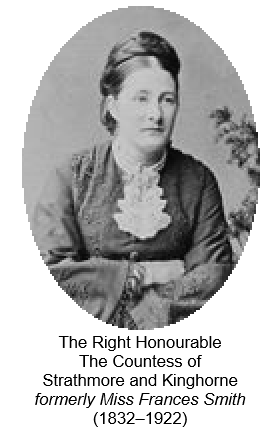

Personal details
- Born: Frances Dora Smith; 29 July 1832 Marylebone, London, England
- Died: 5 February 1922 (aged 89) 19 Hans Place, Chelsea, London, England
- Resting place: Glamis Castle, Angus
- Spouse: Claude Bowes-Lyon, 13th Earl of Strathmore and Kinghorne
- Children: 11, including Claude, Herbert, and Patrick
- Parents: Oswald Smith (father); Henrietta Mildred Hodgson (mother)

Frances Dora Bowes-Lyon, Countess of Strathmore and Kinghorne (née Smith; 29 July 1832 – 5 February 1922) was a British noblewoman. She was the paternal grandmother of Queen Elizabeth the Queen Mother, and thus a great-grandmother of Queen Elizabeth II.

== Early life ==
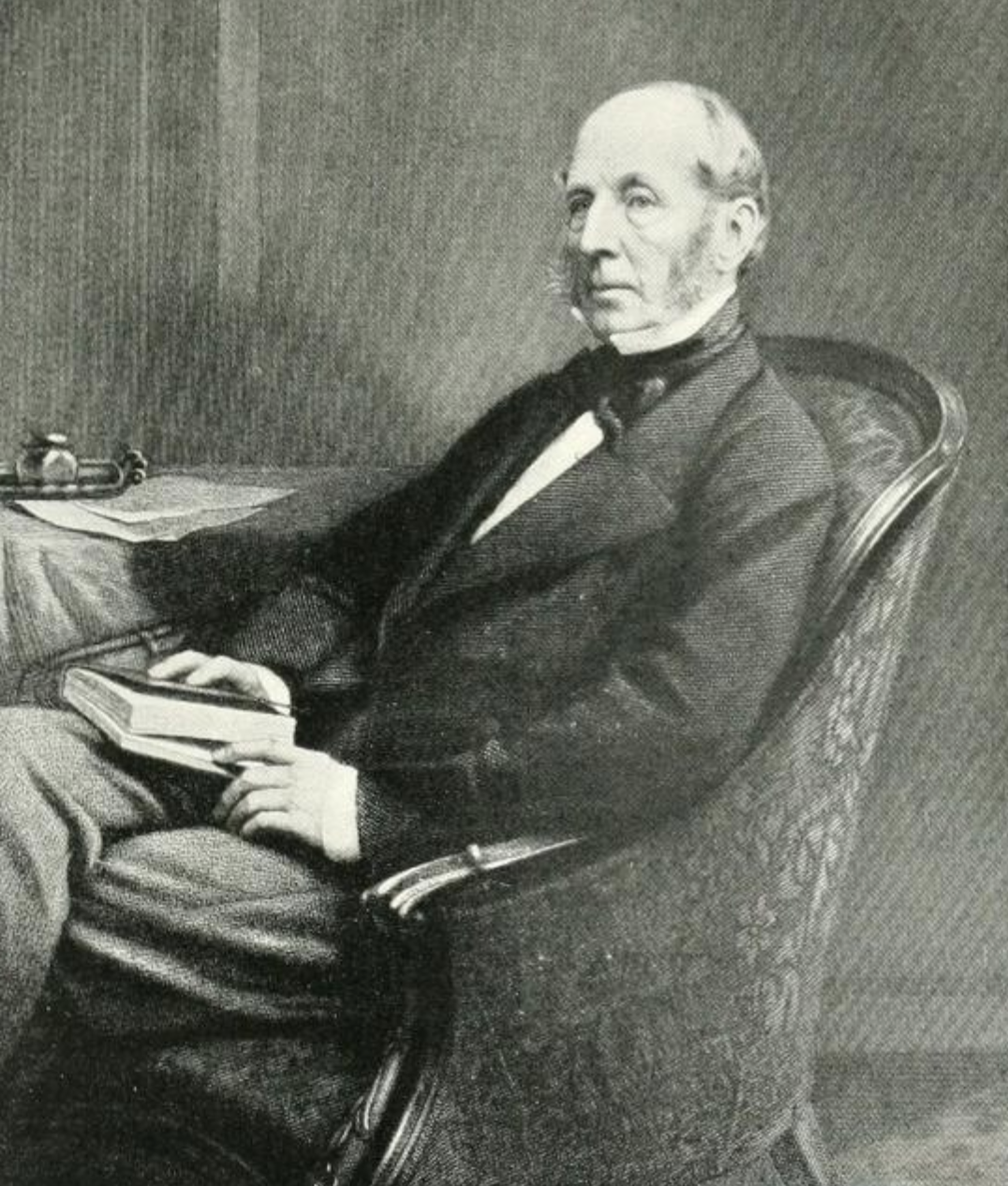
Oswald Smith, father

Frances Smith was born to Oswald Smith (1794–1863), of Blendon Hall, Bexley, Kent, banker with Smith, Payne, and Smith, and Henrietta Mildred Hodgson (1805–1891).

== Marriage ==
On 28 September 1853, Frances married Claude Bowes-Lyon (21 July 1824 – 16 February 1904). He became the 13th holder of the Earldom of Strathmore and Kinghorne following the death of his brother Thomas in 1865. Frances then assumed the title and style of Countess of Strathmore and Kinghorne. Together the couple had 11 children:

- Claude Bowes-Lyon, 14th Earl of Strathmore and Kinghorne (14 March 1855 – 7 November 1944), the father of Queen Elizabeth the Queen Mother and grandfather of Queen Elizabeth II. He married Cecilia Cavendish-Bentinck (11 September 1862 – 23 June 1938) on 16 July 1881. They had 10 children.
- Francis Bowes-Lyon (23 February 1856 – 18 February 1948), married Lady Anne Lindsay (24 December 1858 – 15 December 1936) on 23 November 1883. They had seven children, including Lilian Bowes Lyon.
- Ernest Bowes-Lyon (4 August 1858 – 27 December 1891), married Isobel Hester Drummond (21 May 1860 – 15 July 1945) on 23 August 1882. They had six children, including Ernestine Bowes-Lyon.
- Herbert Bowes-Lyon (15 August 1860 – 14 April 1897), never married.
- Patrick Bowes-Lyon (5 March 1863 – 5 October 1946), a major of the British Army and a tennis player. He married Alice Wiltshire (1867 – 1 March 1953) on 9 August 1893. They had four children.
- Lady Constance Frances Bowes-Lyon (8 October 1865 – 19 November 1951), married Robert Blackburn (27 April 1864 – 21 March 1944) on 21 December 1893. They had four children.
- Kenneth Bowes-Lyon (26 April 1867 – 9 January 1911), never married.
- Lady Mildred Marion Bowes-Lyon (1868 – 9 June 1897), a music composer, famous for Etelinda (an opera premiered in Florence in 1894). She married Augustus Jessup (20 June 1861 – 16 October 1925) on 1 July 1890. They had two children.
- Lady Maud Agnes Bowes-Lyon (12 June 1870 – 28 February 1941), never married.
- Lady Evelyn Mary Bowes-Lyon (16 July 1872 – 15 March 1876), died in infancy.
- Maj. Malcolm Bowes-Lyon (23 April 1874 – 23 August 1957), a lieutenant colonel of the British Army. He married Winifred Gurdon-Rebow (10 October 1876 – 30 May 1957) on 28 September 1907. They had a daughter.

== Later life and death ==
The Earl of Strathmore and Kinghorne died on 16 February 1904, in the Liguria region of Italy, where the Strathmores owned a large house, Villa Etelinda. Lady Strathmore took ownership of the property following her husband's death, and it was later sold to Queen Margherita, the Queen Mother of Italy in 1913.

The Countess survived her late husband by almost 18 years. Her London residence during her widowhood was No. 19 Hans Place, Chelsea. She died at her London residence on 5 February 1922, aged 89. She was buried at Glamis Castle, Angus, the family seat of the earls of Strathmore and Kinghorne.

== Ancestry ==
Her paternal grandparents were George Smith MP and wife Frances Mary Mosley, daughter of Sir John Parker Mosley, 1st Baronet, and sister of Sir Oswald Mosley, 2nd Baronet, great-great-grandfather of the British Union of Fascists leader Sir Oswald Mosley.

Ancestors of Frances Bowes-Lyon, Countess of Strathmore and Kinghorne

8. Abel Smith
4. George Smith
9. Mary Bird
2. Oswald Smith
10. Sir John Mosley, 1st Baronet
5. Frances Mary Mosley
11. Elizabeth Bayley
1. Frances Dora Smith
12. Robert Hodgson (1740–1808)
6. Robert Hodgson
13. Mildred Porteus
3. Henrietta Mildred Hodgson
14. Col. Martin Hill Tucker
7. Mary Tucker
15. Henrietta Baker
