= William Mayne (disambiguation) =

William Mayne was a British children's fiction writer.

William Mayne may also refer to:

- William Mayne, 1st Baron Newhaven (1722–1794), MP for Canterbury, Carysfort and Gatton
- William Mayne (Australian politician) (1808–1902), New South Wales politician
- William Mayne (officer) (1818–1855), English army officer in the service of the East India Company
- William Cyril Mayne (1877–1962), English clergyman and classical scholar
