= Henrietta Mildred Hodgson =

British aristocrat (1805–1891)

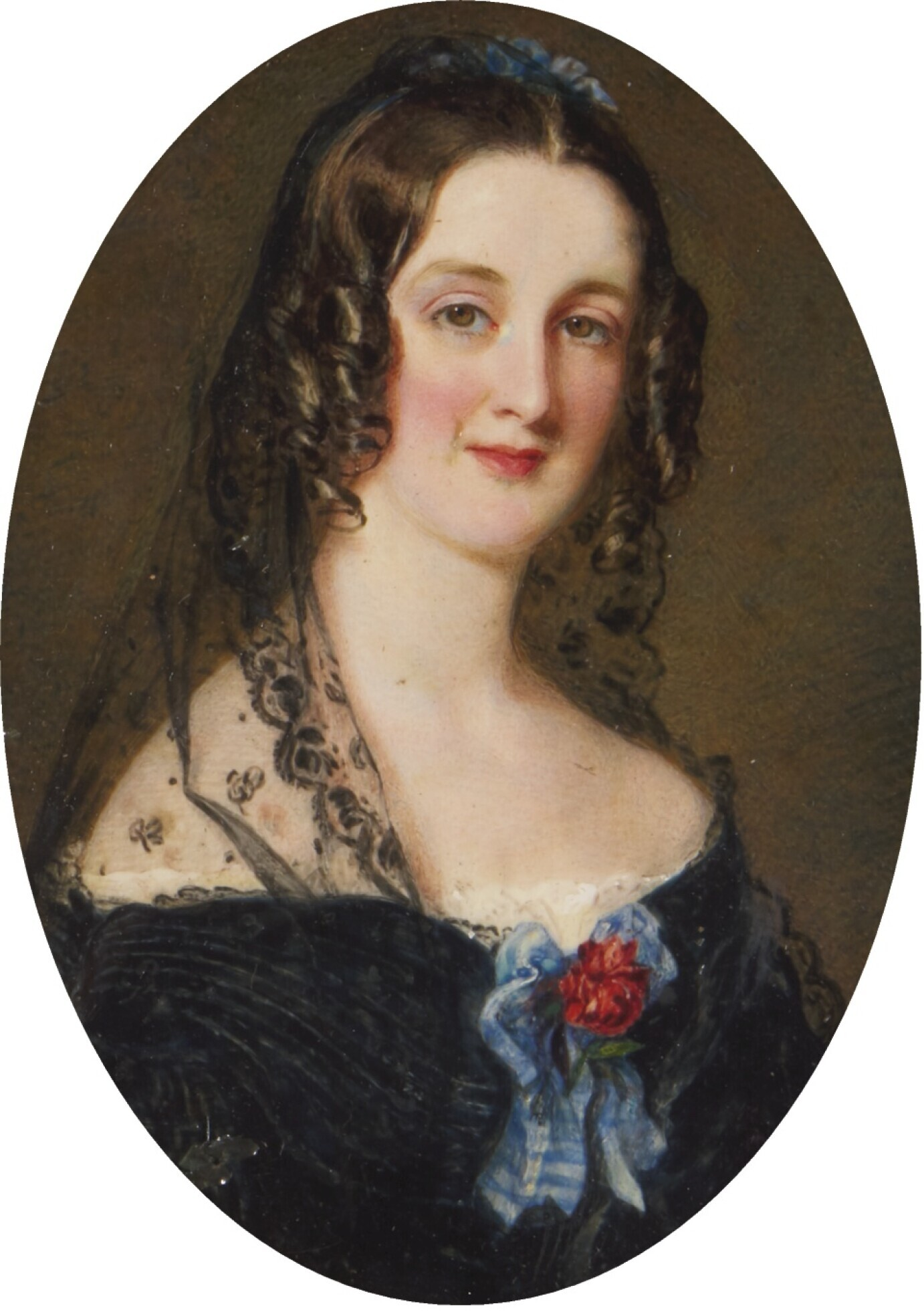
- portrait attributed to William Charles Ross
- Born: 6 January 1805; London, England
- Died: 19 November 1891 (aged 86); Hyde Park, London, England
- Spouse: Oswald Smith
- Parents: Robert Hodgson (father); Mary Tucker (mother)

Henrietta Mildred Hodgson (6 January 1805 – 19 November 1891) was an English lady with both British royal and American presidential genealogical connections.

== Life and family ==
Born on 6 January 1805 in London Henrietta Mildred was the daughter of Robert Hodgson (1776–1844), Dean of Carlisle from 1820 until his death; and of Mary Tucker (born in 1778), a daughter of Colonel Martin Tucker. Her parents had married in 1804. Her grandfather was another Robert Hodgson (born in 1740), of Congleton in Cheshire. Her youngest brother, George Henry Hodgson, was among the officers of Franklin's lost expedition.

On 18 March 1824 at St George's, Hanover Square, Westminster, she married Oswald Smith (7 July 1794 – 18 June 1863), the second son of George Smith. They had seven children:

- Isabella Mary Smith (24 April 1825 – 12 July 1907) m. 1847 Cadogan Hodgson Cadogan (of Brinkburn Priory).
- Oswald Augustus Smith (21 October 1826 – 24 August 1902) m. 1856 Rose Sophia Vansittart.
- Eric Carrington Smith (25 May 1828 – 26 April 1906) m. 1849 Mary Maberly.
- Laura Charlotte Smith (2 August 1829 – 3 June 1912) m. 1848 Col. Evan Maberly.
- Beilby Smith (12 August 1830 – 1831), buried 29 April 1831.
- Frances Dora Smith (29 July 1832 – 5 February 1922) m. 1853 Claude Bowes-Lyon, 13th Earl of Strathmore and Kinghorne.
- Marion Henrietta Smith (25 Feb 1835 – 11 July 1897) m.1854 Lt-Col. Henry Dorrien Streatfeild of Chiddingstone Castle.

In 1853, their daughter Frances married Claude Bowes-Lyon, who later became the Earl of Strathmore and Kinghorne. Frances became the paternal grandmother of Queen Elizabeth The Queen Mother, a great-grandmother of Elizabeth II, and great-great-grandmother of Charles III.

Henrietta Mildred Hodgson was the granddaughter of Mildred Porteus, who had married Robert Hodgson, and was herself the granddaughter of Robert and Mildred Porteus, of Virginia, who in 1720 moved to Yorkshire. The earlier Mildred Porteus was the daughter of John and Mary Smith, Mary being a daughter of Augustine Warner Jr. and a sister of Mildred Warner, who married Lawrence Washington (1659–1698) and was the grandmother of the first U.S. president, George Washington.

Henrietta Mildred Smith died on 19 November 1891. At her death, her memorial in All Saints' Church, Sanderstead in Surrey, states she had 111 living descendants.
