= Mark Boyling =

Dean of Carlisle

Mark Christopher Boyling (born 14 October 1952) is a retired Anglican priest who served as Dean of Carlisle.

Boyling was educated at Keble College, Oxford. His father, Dennis Boyling, was vicar at St Augustine's church in Endcliffe, Sheffield. After a period of study at Ripon College Cuddesdon he was ordained in 1978. His first posts were as Curate then Team Vicar of St Mark's Kirkby. He was then Domestic Chaplain to the Bishop of Liverpool, Vicar of St Peter, Formby and a Canon Residentiary at Liverpool Cathedral before his elevation to the Deanery. He was installed at Carlisle Cathedral on 2 October 2004; he retired effective 30 September 2022.

Church of England titles
Preceded by Graeme Knowles	Dean of Carlisle; 2004 – 2022	Jonathan Brewster
