= Robert Bolton =

Robert Bolton may refer to:

- Robert Bolton (clergyman, born 1572) (1572–1631), English clergyman, academic and preacher
- Robert Bolton (dean of Carlisle) (1697–1763), English churchman
- Bertie Bolton (Robert Henry Dundas Bolton, 1893–1964), Indian Army and British Army officer, police officer and English cricketer
- Robert Bolton (MP) for Derby
- Robert Bolton (politician), Northern Irish unionist politician
