= All Hallows' Church, Tottenham =

Church in London, England

Coordinates: 51.6006°N 0.0767°W

All Hallows' Church
- Parish Church of All Hallows
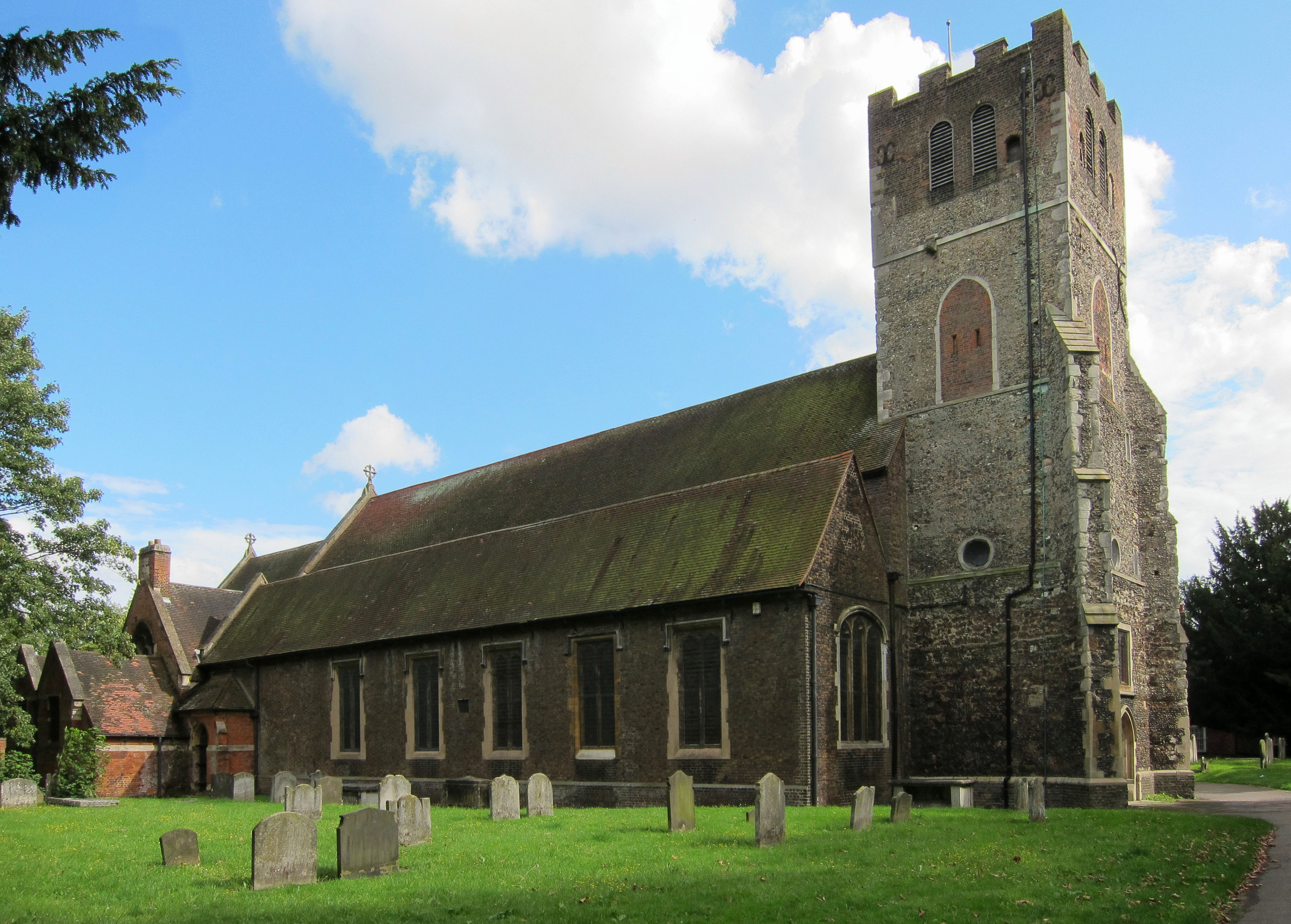
- All Hallows' Church
- Location: Church Lane, Tottenham, London N17 7AA
- Country: England
- Denomination: Church of England
- Churchmanship: Traditional Catholic
- Website: www.allhallowstottenham.com

History
- Founded: c. 1200

Administration
- Diocese: London
- Archdeaconry: Hampstead
- Deanery: Haringey
- Parish: Tottenham – All Hallows

Clergy
- Priest: The Reverend Lee Clark (Priest in Charge) The Reverend Andrew Bailey (Assistant Priest)

All Hallows is an Anglican church in Tottenham, North London. It is one of the oldest buildings in the London Borough of Haringey, having been built as All Saints' Church in the 12th century, then re-dedicated as All Hallows in the 15th century.

It stands adjacent to Bruce Castle and Tottenham Cemetery. It is reputed to have been given to Tottenham by King David I of Scotland, strengthening its connection with the Bruce family who were owners of Bruce Castle. The church is part of the Diocese of London and its clergy have included William Bedwell (from 1607), the devotional writer Edward Sparke (1667–1693), and John Howard Churchill, later Dean of Carlisle.

The church was restored between 1875 and 1877 by the architect William Butterfield. It has been painted many times, including by William Ellis, John Preston Neale, William Henry Prior, John Thomas Smith, Jean Baptiste Claude Chatelain and John Constable.

The church tower houses eight bells, one of which was donated by Dr. Humphrey Jackson in 1801 and was originally said to have been taken from the Quebec garrison, but which has now been proved via extensive research in a variety of archives to be from the Cathedral in Quebec, taken in 1759. These make up the largest ring of bells in the borough.

There are yew trees in the churchyard imported from Ireland more than 1000 years ago.

== Gallery ==
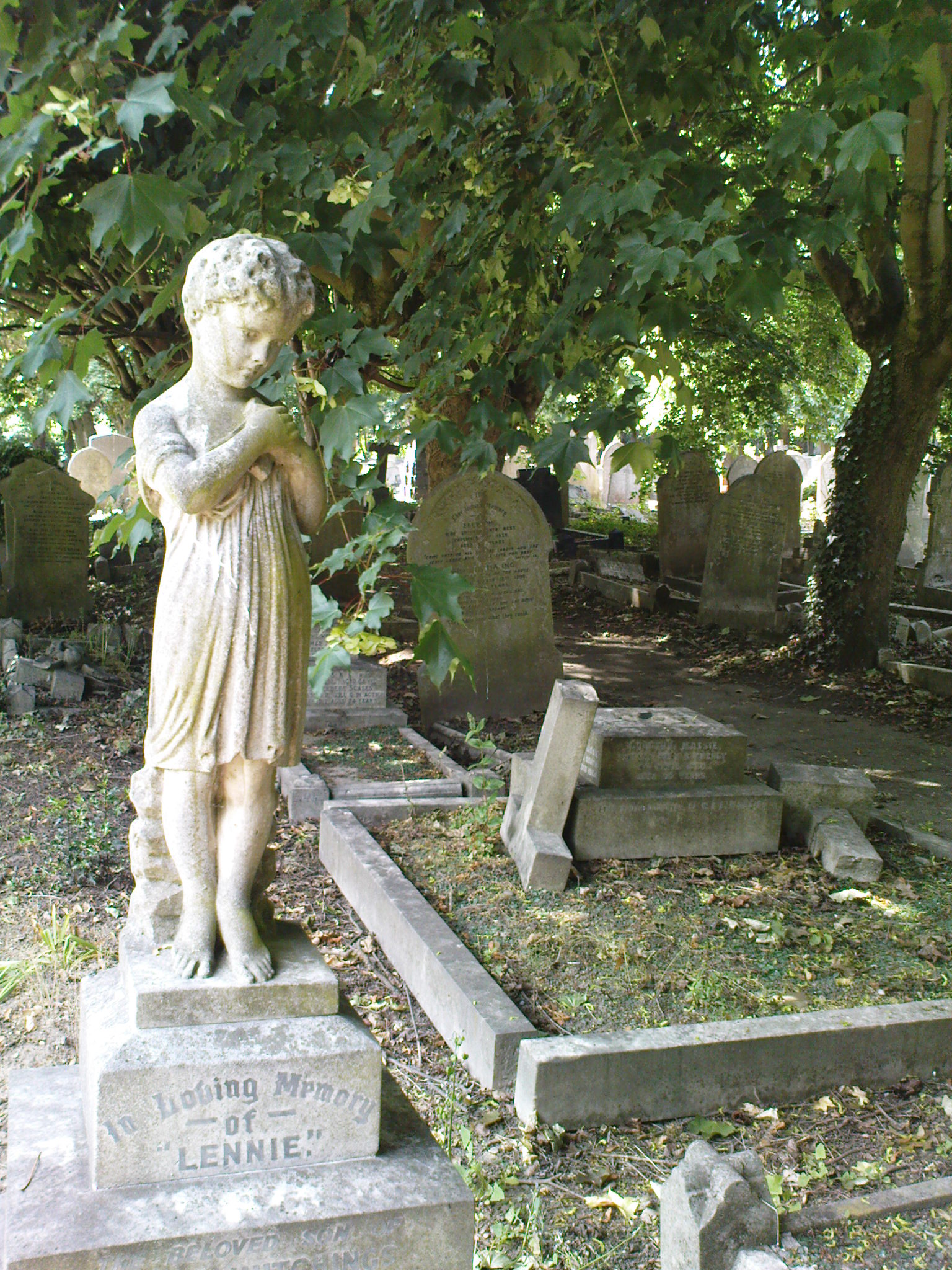
Tottenham cemetery

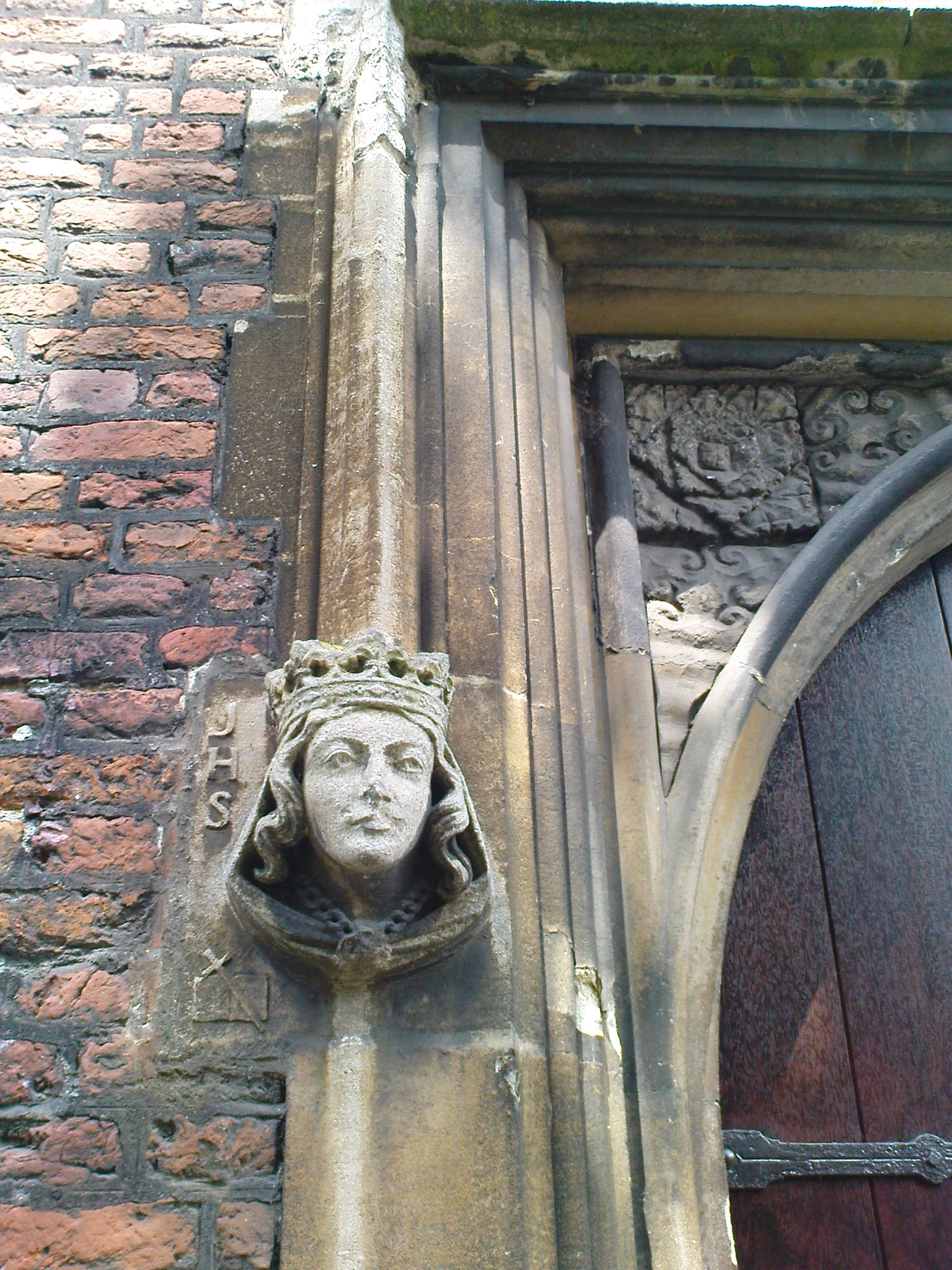
Portal detail
