= Frederick Matheson =

Dean of Carlisle

Frederick William Matheson (29 July 1882 – 1 July 1942) was an Anglican priest, who became Dean of Carlisle.

Matheson was the son of a Scottish clergyman and was educated at Trinity College, Glenalmond, in Scotland, before obtaining a scholarship to study at Keble College, Oxford. He trained for ordination at Cuddesdon College, near Oxford. He was a lecturer at Keble College from 1908 to 1909, becoming one of the tutors in 1909 – at this time, unlike the other colleges of the University of Oxford, Keble did not have fellows, and its senior academic staff were known as tutors. He served as dean of the college from 1914. He left Keble in 1921 to be a canon of Carlisle Cathedral, although he retained a connection with Keble as he was appointed a member of the council in 1921, and served until his death. In 1923, he took up the post of warden of Trinity College, Glenalmond; he was also a canon of St Ninian's Cathedral, Perth, between 1924 and 1938. In 1938, he returned to Carlisle as dean, a position he held until his death on 1 July 1942.

Church of England titles
Preceded by Cecil Cooper	Dean of Carlisle; 1938 – 1942	Succeeded by Cyril Mayne
