= Carlisle Franciscan Friary =

Medieval monastery in Cumbria, England

Coordinates: 54.893115°N 2.933816°W

Carlisle Franciscan Friary was a medieval monastic house in Cumbria, England. It was founded in 1233 near Carlisle Cathedral, and dissolved in 1536 in the Dissolution of the monasteries.
