= Charles Tarrant =

Charles Tarrant (1723–1791) was an Anglican priest.

Tarrant was educated at Balliol College, Oxford. He held incumbencies at North Tidworth, the City of Westminster, Staines, Bloomsbury, Lamberhurst and Wrotham. He was Dean of Carlisle during 1764; and then Dean of Peterborough until his death on 22 February 1791.

Church of England titles
Preceded by Robert Bolton	Dean of Carlisle; 8 March 1764 – 14 July 1764	Succeeded by Thomas Wilson
Preceded by Robert Lamb	Dean of Peterborough; 21 July 1764– 22 February 1791	Succeeded by Charles Manners-Sutton
