= Thomas Wilson (dean of Carlisle) =

Dean of Carlisle

Thomas Wilson was Dean of Carlisle from 1764 until his death on 25 September 1778.

Wilson was educated at Giggleswick School and Christ's College, Cambridge. He was Vicar of Torpenhow from 1743.

Church of England titles
Preceded by Charles Tarrant	Dean of Carlisle; 1764–1778	Succeeded by Thomas Percy
