= Jonathan Brewster (priest) =

British Anglican priest

The Very Reverend Jonathan Brewster
- Dean of Carlisle
- Church: Church of England
- Diocese: Diocese of Carlisle
- In office: September 2023 to July 2025
- Other post: Canon Treasurer of St Paul's Cathedral (2017–2021)

Orders
- Ordination: 1994 (deacon); 1995 (priest)

Personal details
- Born: Jonathan David Brewster; 1967 (age 58–59)
- Denomination: Anglicanism

Jonathan David Brewster (born 1967) is a British Anglican priest. He was Dean of Carlisle from September 2023 to July 2025. Previously, he had been chaplain to the University of Westminster (1998–2003), vicar of Christ Church Highbury (2003–2017), and canon treasurer of St Paul's Cathedral in the Diocese of London (2017–2021). His final position before becoming dean was as team vicar of the Cartmel Peninsula Team Ministry in the Diocese of Carlisle from 2021 to 2023.

== Early life and education ==
Brewster was born in 1967. He studied business management at Buckinghamshire College of Education, graduating with a Higher National Diploma (HND) or Bachelor of Arts (BA) degree in 1989. While at college, he was president of its Christian Union. He then worked at Lloyd's of London for an underwriting syndicate. From 1991 to 1994, he studied theology at trained for ordination at Trinity College, Bristol, an evangelical Anglican theological college. He graduated from the University of Bristol with a BA degree in 1994. He would later study systematic theology at King's College London, graduating with a Master of Arts (MA) degree in 2001.

== Ordained ministry ==
Brewster was ordained in the Church of England as a deacon in 1994 and as a priest in 1995. From 1994 to 1998, he served his curacy at St John's Church, Great Horton, in the Diocese of Bradford. In 1998, he became a chaplain to the University of Westminster in London. In 2003, he was appointed vicar of Christ Church with St John and St Saviour in Highbury in the Diocese of London. He was additionally area dean of Islington from 2014 to 2017, and acting Archdeacon of Hackney from 2015 to 2016.

On 8 May 2017, it was announced that Brewster had been made a residentiary canon of St Paul's Cathedral. He was installed as a residentiary canon and appointed canon treasurer by Pete Broadbent, acting Bishop of London, during a service at St Paul's Cathedral in July 2017. As Canon Treasurer he had oversight of the building and the commercial and financial aspects of the cathedral's ministry.

On 13 September 2021, he was appointed interim mission community leader and transitional vicar in the Cartmel Peninsula Team Ministry in the Diocese of Carlisle; he took up the post in October 2021. On 28 June 2023, he was announced as the next Dean of Carlisle, in succession to Mark Boyling. He was installed as the 42nd Dean of Carlisle during a service at Carlisle Cathedral on 30 September 2023. He announced his departure from the cathedral in July 2025.

Church of England titles
Preceded by Mark Boyling	Dean of Carlisle; 2023 – 2025	Vacant
