= William Peterson (priest) =

William Peterson was Dean of Carlisle between 1626 and 1629; and of Exeter between 1629 and 1661.

== Notes ==
Religious titles
| Preceded by Francis White | Dean of Carlisle; 1626–1629 | Succeeded by Thomas Comber |
| Preceded by Matthew Sutcliffe | Dean of Exeter; 1629–1661 | Succeeded by Seth Ward |
