= John Cramer (priest) =

English classical scholar & geographer (1793–1848)

John Antony Cramer
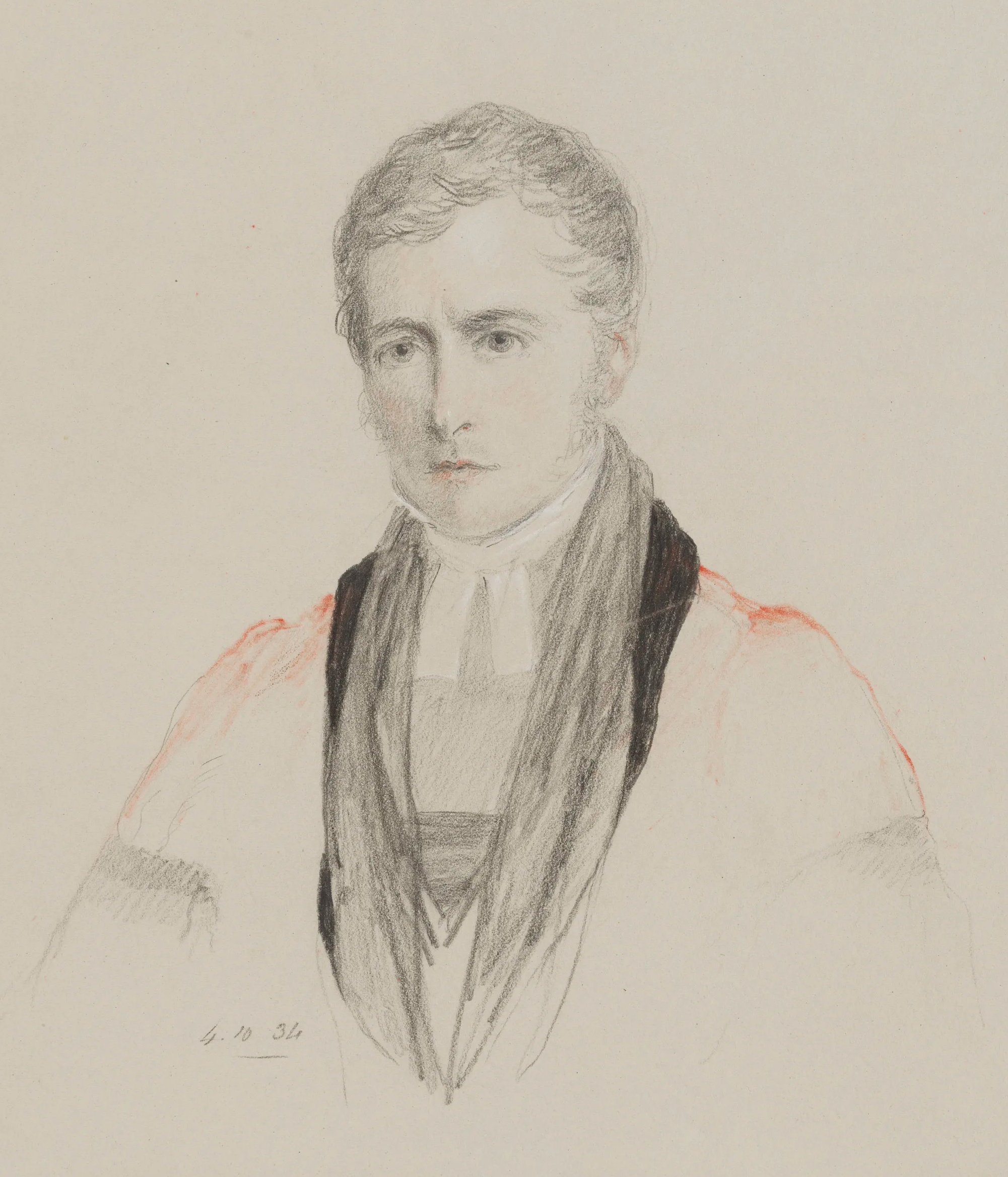
- 1834 chalk drawing of Cramer by William Brockedon
- Born: 1793; Mitlödi, Swiss Confederacy
- Died: 24 August 1848 (aged 54–55); Scarborough, England
- Education: Westminster School; Christ Church, Oxford
- Occupation: Historian
- Title: Regius Professor of Modern History
- Term: 1842–1848
- Predecessor: Thomas Arnold
- Successor: Henry Halford Vaughan

John Antony Cramer (1793 – 24 August 1848), English classical scholar and geographer, was born at Mitlödi in Switzerland.

== Life ==
He was educated at Westminster and Christ Church, Oxford. He resided in Oxford until 1844, during which time he held many important offices, being public orator, principal of New Inn Hall (1831–1847), and Regius Professor of Modern History from 1842 until 1848. He built the Cramer Building at New Inn Hall in 1833, which was converted into the St Peter's College dining hall in 1929. In 1844 he was appointed to the deanery of Carlisle Cathedral, which he held until his death at Scarborough on 24 August 1848.

== Works ==
His works include:

- A Dissertation on the Passage of Hannibal over the Alps, published with his cousin, Henry Lewis Wickham (2nd edition, 1828).
- geographical and historical descriptions of Ancient Italy (1826)
- Ancient Greece (1828)
- Asia Minor (1832)
- Travels of Nicander Nucius of Corcyra traveller of the 16th century in England (1841)
- Catenae Graecorum Patrum in Novum Testamentum (1838–1844)
- Anecdota Graeca e codd. manuscriptis bibliothecarum oxoniensium (4 volumes, 1835-1837)
- Anecdota Graeca (from the manuscripts of the royal library in Paris, 4 volumes, 1839–1841).

== Notes ==
Church of England titles
Preceded by Robert Hodgson	Dean of Carlisle; 1844 – 1848	Succeeded by Samuel Hinds
