= Rydal Hall =

Country house in Cumbria, England

Coordinates: 54.4486°N 2.9801°W

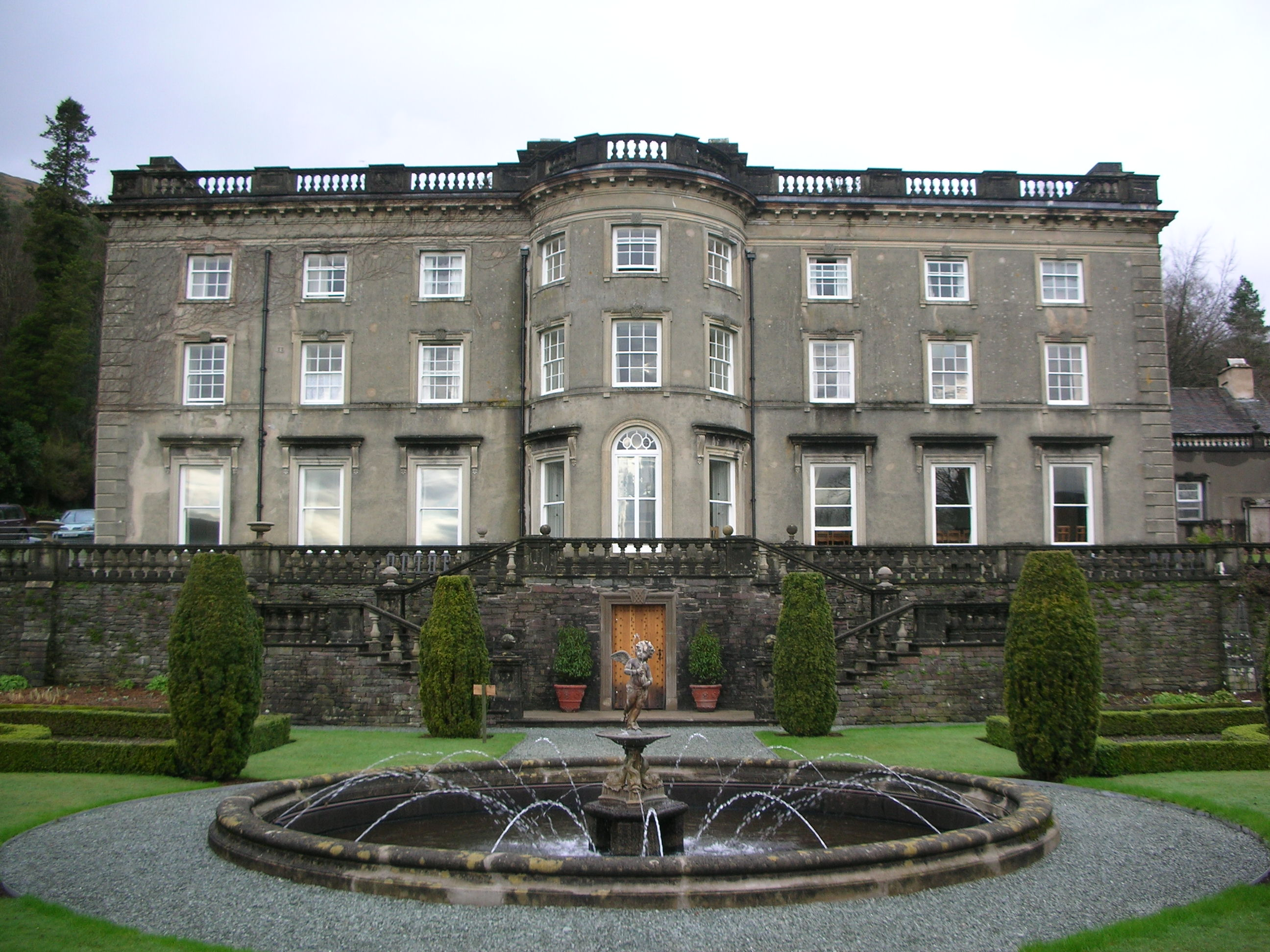
Rydal Hall and its formal gardens

Rydal Hall is a large detached house on the outskirts of the village of Rydal, Cumbria, in the English Lake District. It has an early nineteenth-century front facade, but includes some earlier fabric.

The hall is Grade II* listed on the National Heritage List for England and its gardens are listed Grade II* on the Register of Historic Parks and Gardens.

The terraces to the south of the hall and the barns and stables to the north and east are listed Grade II*. The summerhouse, game larder, and ice house in the grounds of the hall are all individually Grade II* listed. The bridge over Rydal Beck is listed Grade II*.

== History ==
The house was built as the country seat of the Le Fleming baronets, and was sold with its gardens to the Diocese of Carlisle in 1970. The estate remained in the ownership of the Le Fleming family as of 1997. The house plays host to retreats, conferences and courses, and holiday accommodation. There is also the Old School Room Tea Shop, located on the "Coffin Route" footpath, which leads to Grasmere.

== Gardens ==
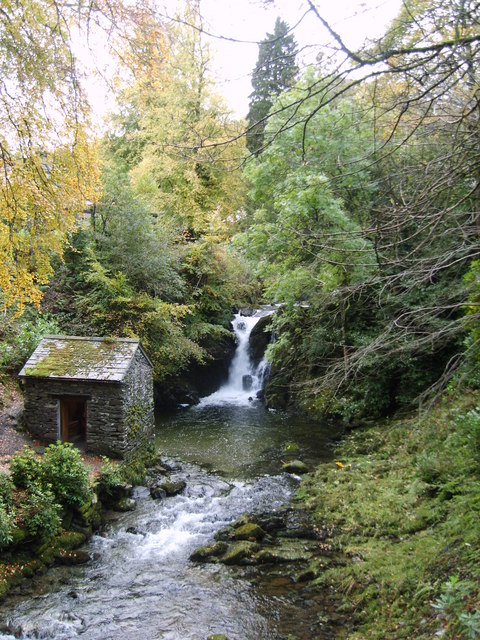
"The Grot" at Rydal Falls

The gardens are open to the public. In the mid-17th century, Sir Daniel Fleming (1633–1701) developed the landscape as an early Picturesque garden incorporating Rydal Beck and its natural waterfalls. 'The Grot' (a summerhouse designed for viewing a waterfall) became a major attraction for a succession of visiting artists and writers in the 18th and 19th century.

The formal gardens in front of the house were designed in 1909 by the garden designer and landscape architect Thomas Hayton Mawson (1861–1933). Mawson's Italianate terraces are listed Grade II*. These formal gardens were restored in 2005-7 by Tom Attwood. A community vegetable garden was created at the same time.

=== The gardens and Wordsworth ===
"The Grot" at Rydal Falls is described in William Wordsworth's early poem, "An Evening Walk", published in 1793. The poet moved to Rydal Mount, near Rydal Hall, in 1813 and it remained his home to his death in 1850. Towards the end of the poet's life his nephew Christopher Wordsworth went with him to "The Grot". The following is a description of their walk together from Rydal Mount.

"He accompanied me to the gate and then said if I had a few minutes longer to spare he would like to show me the waterfall which was close by – the lower fall of Rydal. I gladly assented and he led the way across the grounds of Lady Fleming (Rydal Hall) which were opposite to his own to a small summer-house. The moment we opened the door the waterfall was before us. The summer house being so placed as to occupy the exact spot from which it was to be seen. The rocks and shrubbery around closing it in on every side. The effect was magical. The view from the rustic house, the rocky basin into which the water fell and the deep shade in which the whole was enveloped, made it a lovely scene. Wordsworth seemed to have much pleasure in exhibiting this beautiful retreat."

Rydal Hall participates annually in "Wordsworth's Daffodil Legacy", an initiative of the National Gardens Scheme, as does the National Trust property Dora's Field. This is a special opening to raise monies for charity: normally visitors are invited to make a donation to the upkeep of the gardens.

== See also ==
- Grade II* listed buildings in Westmorland and Furness
- Listed buildings in Lakes, Cumbria
- Sir George Fleming, 2nd Baronet
