= Lionel du Toit =

Dean of Carlisle

Lionel Meiring Spafford du Toit (26 January 1903 – 23 January 1979) was Dean of Carlisle from 1960 to 1973.

Rev du Toit was born in Urmston, Lancashire. He was educated at Manchester Grammar School and Merton College, Oxford and ordained in 1928.

He was a curate at Rochdale Parish Church until 1931 and then Swinton Parish Church until 1935. He was Rector at Christ Church, Moss Side. until 1943 and Vicar of St Mary's, Windermere until his elevation to the Deanery. He retired in 1973 and died on 23 January 1979.

Church of England titles
Preceded by William Cyril Mayne	Dean of Carlisle; 1960–1973	Succeeded by John Howard Churchill
