= Thomas Comber (dean of Carlisle) =

English linguist

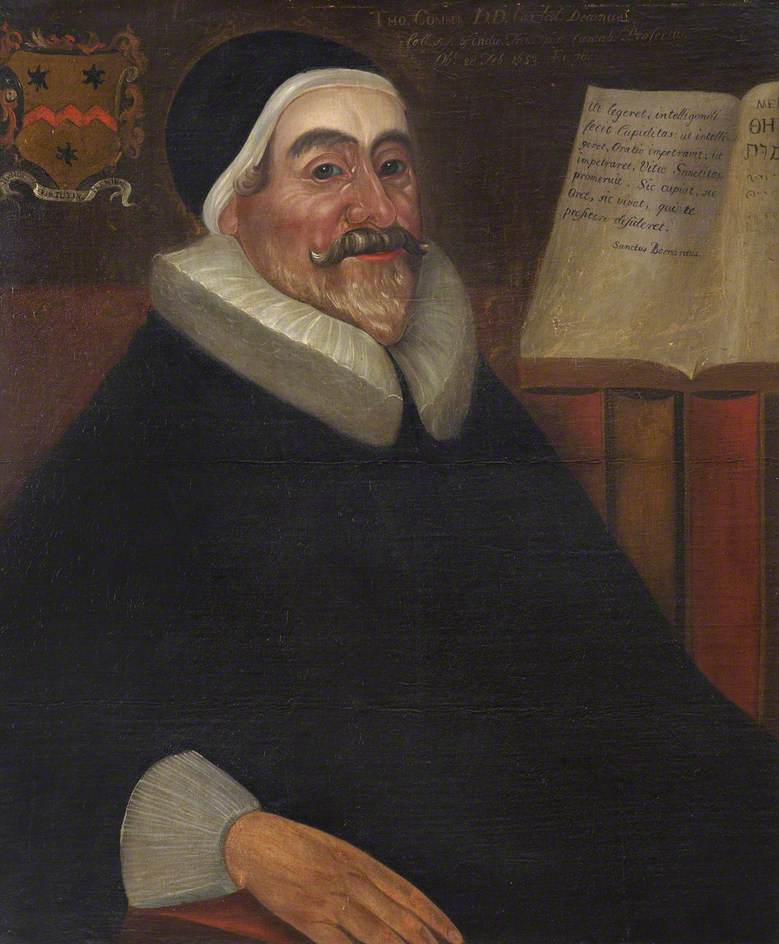
Thomas Comber

Thomas Comber (1575 – 28 February 1653) was an English linguist. He was the Dean of Carlisle and Master of Trinity College, Cambridge.

He was born at Shermanbury, Sussex about the end of the sixteenth century, the 12th child of Sir Richard Comber, the Clarenceux King of Arms at the Herald Court. He was educated at Horsham and Trinity College, Cambridge. He was an expert linguist fluent in Greek and Latin, and familiar with several other languages. In 1623 on his return from travels on the continent, he was elected King's Chaplain and soon afterwards Dean of Carlisle. In 1631, he was elected Master of Trinity College and Vice-Chancellor of the University of Cambridge. At the outbreak of the English Civil War, he sided with the royalists and was hounded by the Puritans, who imprisoned him in 1642 until his death on 28 February 1653.

Comber married Susan, a widow and daughter of Freston of Norwich. After Comber's death she married Thomas Sclater.

Church of England titles
Preceded by William Peterson	Dean of Carlisle; 1629–1654	Succeeded by Guy Carleton
Academic offices
Preceded by Samuel Brooke	Master of Trinity College, Cambridge; 1631–1645	Succeeded by Thomas Hill
