= Le Fleming baronets =

Title in the Baronetage of England

- Escutcheon of the Fleming (later le Fleming) baronets of Rydal
- Creation date: 1705
- Created by: Anne
- Peerage: Peerage of England
- Status: extant
- Seat: Rydal Hall
- Motto: Pax, copia, sapientia, Peace, plenty, wisdom

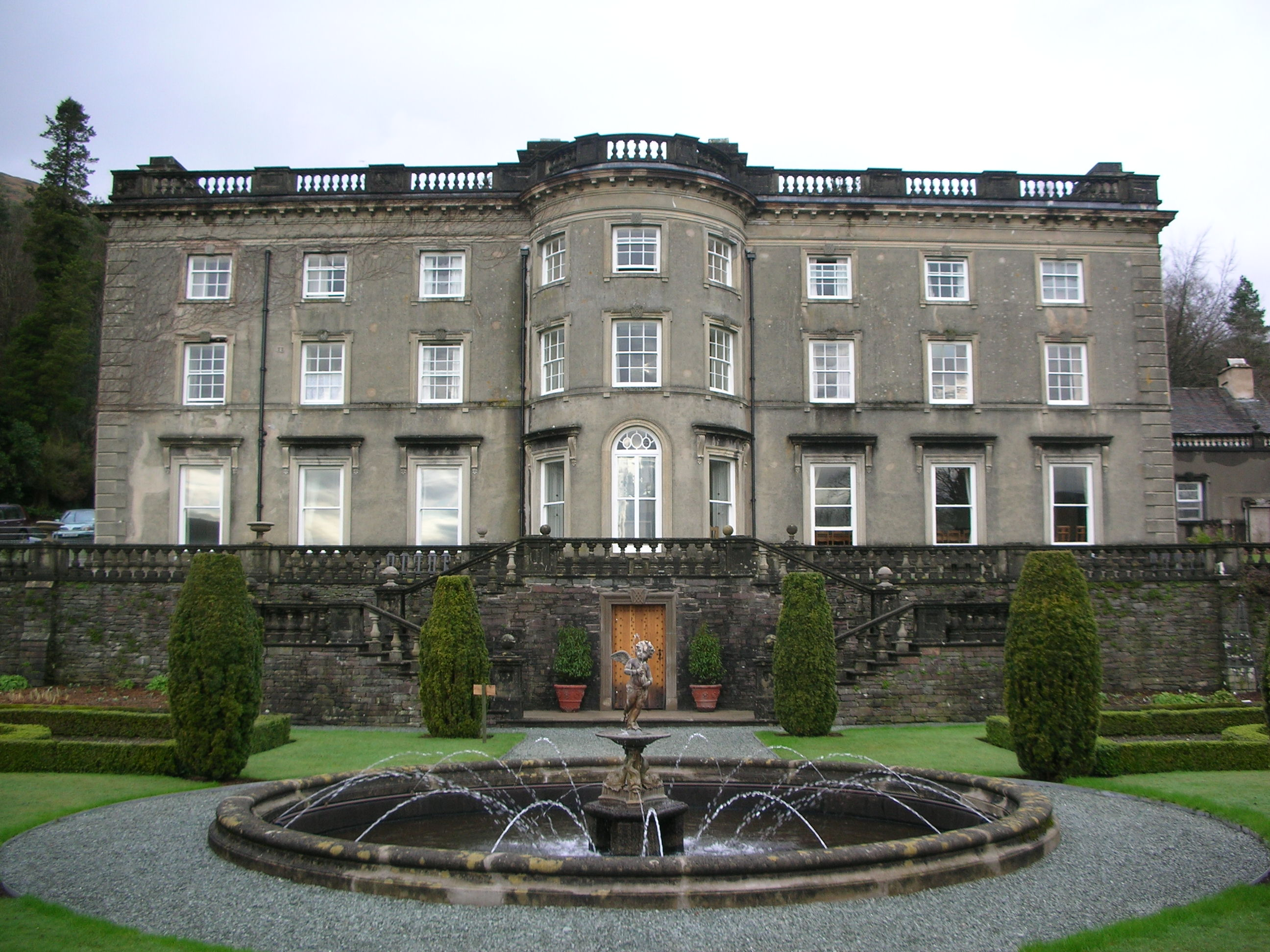
Rydal Hall, the family seat of the Flemings

The Fleming, later le Fleming Baronetcy, of Rydal in the County of Westmorland, is a title in the Baronetage of England. It was created on 4 October 1705 for William Fleming, Member of Parliament for Westmorland. The second Baronet was Bishop of Carlisle. The third Baronet represented Cumberland in the British House of Commons. The fourth Baronet was Member of Parliament for Westmorland. He assumed the surname of le Fleming, an ancient version of the family surname. This version of the surname has also been borne by the Baronets from the seventh Baronet onwards. The sixth Baronet, an ordained priest, served as Rector of Windermere.

The family seat was Rydal Hall, near Rydal, Cumbria.

== Fleming, later le Fleming baronets, of Rydal (1705) ==
- Sir William Fleming, 1st Baronet (1656–1736)
- Sir George Fleming, 2nd Baronet (c. 1670–1747)
- Sir William Fleming, 3rd Baronet (died 1757)
- Sir Michael le Fleming, 4th Baronet (1748–1806)
- Sir Daniel Fleming, 5th Baronet (c. 1785–1821)
- Rev. Sir Richard Fleming, 6th Baronet (1791–1857)
- Sir Michael le Fleming, 7th Baronet (1828–1883)
- Sir Andrew Fleming Hudleston le Fleming, 8th Baronet (1855–1925)
- Sir William Hudleston le Fleming, 9th Baronet (1861–1945)
- Sir Frank Thomas le Fleming, 10th Baronet (1887–1971)
- Sir William Kelland le Fleming, 11th Baronet (1922–1988)
- Sir Quentin John le Fleming, 12th Baronet (1949–1995)
- Sir David Kelland le Fleming, 13th Baronet (born 1976)

The heir presumptive is the present holder's brother Andrew John le Fleming (born 1979).

== See also ==
- Fleming baronets
