= Henry Stapleton =

Dean of Carlisle

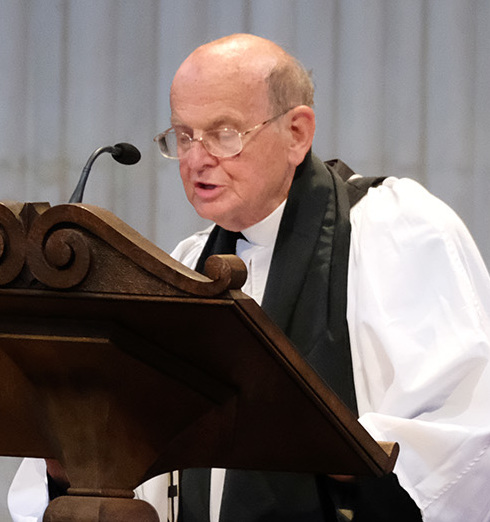
The Very Revd Stapleton in 2018

Henry Edward Champneys Stapleton MBE (born 17 June 1932) was Dean of Carlisle from 1988 to 1998.

Stapleton was educated at Lancing College and Pembroke College, Cambridge and ordained in 1956. He held curacies at St Olave with St Giles, York and All Saints' Pocklington. He was Vicar of Seaton Ross then Rector of Skelton. From 1975 to 1981 he was Vicar of Wroxham and then a canon residentiary at Rochester Cathedral until his appointment as Dean of Carlisle.

An author, his writings include Skelton Village (1971). Heirs without Title (1974), The Skilful Master Builder (1975), The Model Working Parson (1976) and The Churchyards Handbook (with Peter Burman, 1988).

Church of England titles
Preceded by John Howard Churchill	Dean of Carlisle; 1988– 1998	Succeeded by Graeme Knowles
