= John Churchill (priest) =

Dean of Carlisle

John Howard Churchill (9 June 1920 – 29 April 1990) was Dean of Carlisle from 1973 to 1987.

Born in 1920, he was educated at Sutton Valence School and Trinity College, Cambridge and ordained in 1944. He held curacies at St George, Camberwell and All Hallows, Tottenham before becoming Chaplain of King's College London and a lecturer in Theology. In 1960, he became Vicar of St George, Sheffield and in 1973 a Canon Residentiary of St Edmundsbury Cathedral, his last post before the deanery. An eminent author, he died in 1990.

Church of England titles
Preceded by Lionel Meiring Spafford du Toit	Dean of Carlisle; 1973–1987	Succeeded by Henry Edward Champneys Stapleton
