= Robert Hodgson (dean of Carlisle) =

English clergyman (d. 1844)

The Very Reverend Robert Hodgson FRS
- Born: Congleton, Cheshire, England
- Baptised: 22 September 1773
- Died: 9 October 1844 (aged 70–71); Westminster, England
- Burial place: St George's, Hanover Square, London
- Title: Dean of Carlisle
- Term: 1820–1844
- Predecessor: Isaac Milner
- Successor: John Cramer

Robert Hodgson FRS (c. 1773 – 9 October 1844) was Dean of Carlisle from 1820 to 1844.

== Life ==
He was born to Robert Hodgson, of Congleton, and Mildred (née Porteus) in early 1773. He was baptised on 22 September 1773 at St Peter's Church, Congleton. Hodgson was a close relative (by marriage on his father's side and by blood on his mother's side) of Beilby Porteus, Bishop of London, about whom he wrote a biography.

On his mother's side, he was a descendant of Augustine Warner Jr., who presided as the Speaker of the Virginia House of Burgesses during Bacon's Rebellion (Warner served before the Rebellion in 1676, and after the Rebellion in 1677.), and through him a relative of George Washington.

Hodgson was educated at Macclesfield School and Peterhouse, Cambridge, where he graduated BA as 14th Wrangler in 1795. He was rector of St George's, Hanover Square for over forty years, from 1803 until his death in 1844. He was also Chaplain-General of the Forces from 1824 until his death.

== Family ==
Hodgson married Mary Tucker on 23 February 1804. Their son, George Henry Hodgson, was a Lieutenant on the ill-fated Franklin Expedition. Their daughter Henrietta Mildred Hodgson was a great-grandmother of Queen Elizabeth the Queen Mother.

Church of England titles
Preceded by Isaac Milner	Dean of Carlisle; 1820 – 1844	Succeeded by John Cramer
