= Carlisle Dominican Friary =

Friary in Cumbria, England (1233-1539)

Coordinates: 54.892825°N 2.936069°W

Carlisle Dominican Friary was a friary in Cumbria, England. The Dominican order settled in Carlisle in 1233. The convent of the Black Friars, as this was known, was located between what was later the St. Cuthberts's church and the English gate. Later archeological findings show that the convent was built over an earlier Roman settlement.

The friary was dissolved along with other religious houses in the spring of 1539 by Richard, Bishop of Dover. Unlike other houses the buildings were retained and converted to a council chamber and storehouse. None of these remain in the present city of Carlisle.
