= Cyril Mayne =

British priest and classical scholar (1877–1962)

The Very Reverend Cyril Mayne
- Dean of Carlisle
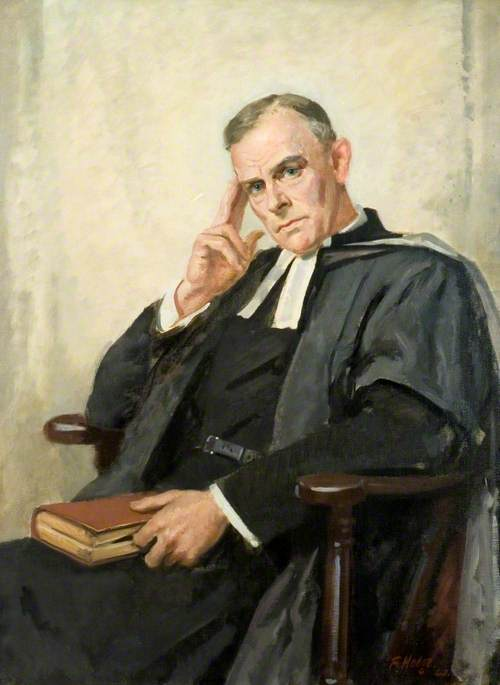
- Portrait by Francis Edwin Hodge
- In office: 1943–1959

Personal details
- Born: 14 April 1877 Gloucester
- Died: 20 July 1962 (aged 85) Hayton, Carlisle
- Denomination: Anglican
- Spouse: Mary Onslow (m. 1930)

William Cyril Mayne (14 April 1877 – 20 July 1962) was an English clergyman and classical scholar. He was Dean of Carlisle from 1943 to 1959.

== Early life ==
William Cyril Mayne was born in Gloucester, the son of the Revd Jonathan Mayne and his wife, Lydia Dorothea Hawksley. He was educated at Westminster and Trinity College, Cambridge, graduating B.A. in Classics in 1899. He was an assistant master at Eastbourne College and Malvern College before being made Deacon in the Church of England on 23 December 1906. An assistant master at Rugby School from 1907 until 1912, he was ordained Priest by Bishop Huyshe Yeatman-Biggs of Worcester on 22 December 1907.

He became Assistant Curate at All Saints, Poplar in 1912. In July 1914 he was appointed Vice-Principal of Bishops' College, Cheshunt.

== Military chaplain ==
Mayne was commissioned as a temporary Chaplain to the Forces, 4th class, Army Chaplains Department on 30 October 1914. He was posted on attachment to the 29th Division, and left England for the Dardanelles, via Egypt, on 29 April 1915. He served on operations at Gallipoli and in France and Flanders, winning golden opinions: "I knew him when he was a chaplain in the famous 29th Division, and I recall his holding a confirmation class in a regimental aid post which was little more than a hole in the ground and a few sandbags. He was much loved and known to all of us as a front line padre" (Dr. J.F. Mayne [no relation]). Mayne also met William Wand, a future bishop of London, in Gallipoli. Wand was an unattached chaplain awaiting a placement and Mayne took him temporarily under his wing. "Many years later", wrote Wand in his autobiography A Changeful Place, "when he was Dean of Carlisle, I had the pleasure of meeting him again and thanking him for the good deed done to an impotent man away back in 1915". He was promoted temporary Chaplain to the Forces, 3rd class, on 23 November 1916, and was posted as Senior Chaplain to the Forces to the 33rd Division.

== Later career ==
He was finally released from the Army on 21 January 1919, and returned to Bishops' College, Cheshunt as acting Principal. His contract as Chaplain to the Forces expired, and he relinquished his commission on 28 April 1919, being appointed as an Honorary Chaplain to the Forces, 4th class.

In 1920 he was appointed to succeed the Rev. Canon Frederick Cyril Nugent Hicks as Principal of Bishop's College, Cheshunt, where he remained until 1925, when he was appointed Rector of All Saints’, Poplar, with St. Nicholas’, Blackwall.

He was Rural Dean of Poplar until 1930, in which year he became Vicar of Chiswick. From 1934 to 1943 he was Professor of Greek and Classical Literature at Durham University and a Canon Residentiary at Durham Cathedral, when he was elevated to the Deanery of Carlisle.

He served as Warden of the Order of St Elizabeth of Hungary (formerly known as the Confraternity of the Divine Love) from 1934 until 1956.

== Death ==
He retired in 1959 and died in Hayton outside Carlisle on Friday, 20 July 1962.

== Works ==
He published The Olympian Odes of Pindar (a verse translation) in 1906, The Heroes by Charles Kingsley in 1913,Hawthorne’s Wonder Book and Tanglewood Tales in 1915, and The Holy Birth. A nativity play in four scenes in 1947.

Mayne "went to Carlisle with a reputation for scholarship and left after becoming the greatest builder for 100 years."

== Personal life ==
He was married by the Rev. J. Gordon Birch, assisted by Canon Down, in Diddlebury Church in Shropshire on 14 January 1930 to Miss Mary Onslow. The marriage was childless. Mrs Mayne died, aged 87 years, in Carlisle in 1990.

== Notes ==
Church of England titles
Preceded by Frederick William Matheson	Dean of Carlisle; 1943–1959	Succeeded by Lionel Meiring Spafford du Toit
