= Robert Bolton (dean of Carlisle) =

English churchman (1697–1763)

Robert Bolton (1697–1763) was an English churchman, dean of Carlisle from 1735.

== Life ==
He was born in London in April 1697. His father was a merchant in Lambeth, who died when his son was in his third year. He received his education at Kensington. He was admitted a commoner of Wadham College, Oxford on 12 April 1712, where he was subsequently elected a scholar. He graduated B.A. in 1715, and M.A. 13 June 1718. In July 1719 he was transferred to Hart Hall, and soon afterwards took holy orders. In 1722 he was chosen fellow of Dulwich College. He was a favourite with John Robinson, the bishop of London, with whom he resided for about two years. On the resignation of Joseph Butler, Bolton became preacher at the Rolls Chapel in London, 1729, on the nomination of Sir Joseph Jekyll.

As fellow of Dulwich College, Bolton took up residence there on 10 March 1722, but resigned his fellowship on 1 May 1725. He then moved to Kensington, depending mainly on his personal fortune, and became close to William Whiston, from he had introductions to both Jekyll and Lord Hardwicke. Bolton was preferred to the deanery of Carlisle, and admitted 1 February 1735. Later (1738) he was instituted vicar of St. Mary's, Reading. He held both benefices together for life, and was non-resident in his deanery. He raised some money to add to poor livings in the diocese of Carlisle.

Bolton died in London on 26 November 1763, having come to town to consult Dr. Anthony Addington. He was buried in the church-porch of St. Mary's, Reading.

== Works ==
Bolton was popular as a preacher on special occasions, and published some sermons. His most typical work was Deity's Delay in punishing the Guilty considered on the Principles of Reason (1751). Bolton issued a collection of short works on the Choice of Company, on Intemperance in Eating and Drinking, on Pleasure, on Public Worship, and Letter to a young Nobleman on leaving School (1761 and 1762).

== Notes ==
Attribution

This article incorporates text from a publication now in the public domain: Stephen, Leslie, ed. (1886). "Bolton, Robert (1697-1763)". Dictionary of National Biography. Vol. 5. London: Smith, Elder & Co.

Church of England titles
Preceded by George Fleming	Dean of Carlisle; 1734–1763	Succeeded by Charles Tarrant
