= Dean of Carlisle =

Anglican head of Diocese of Carlisle

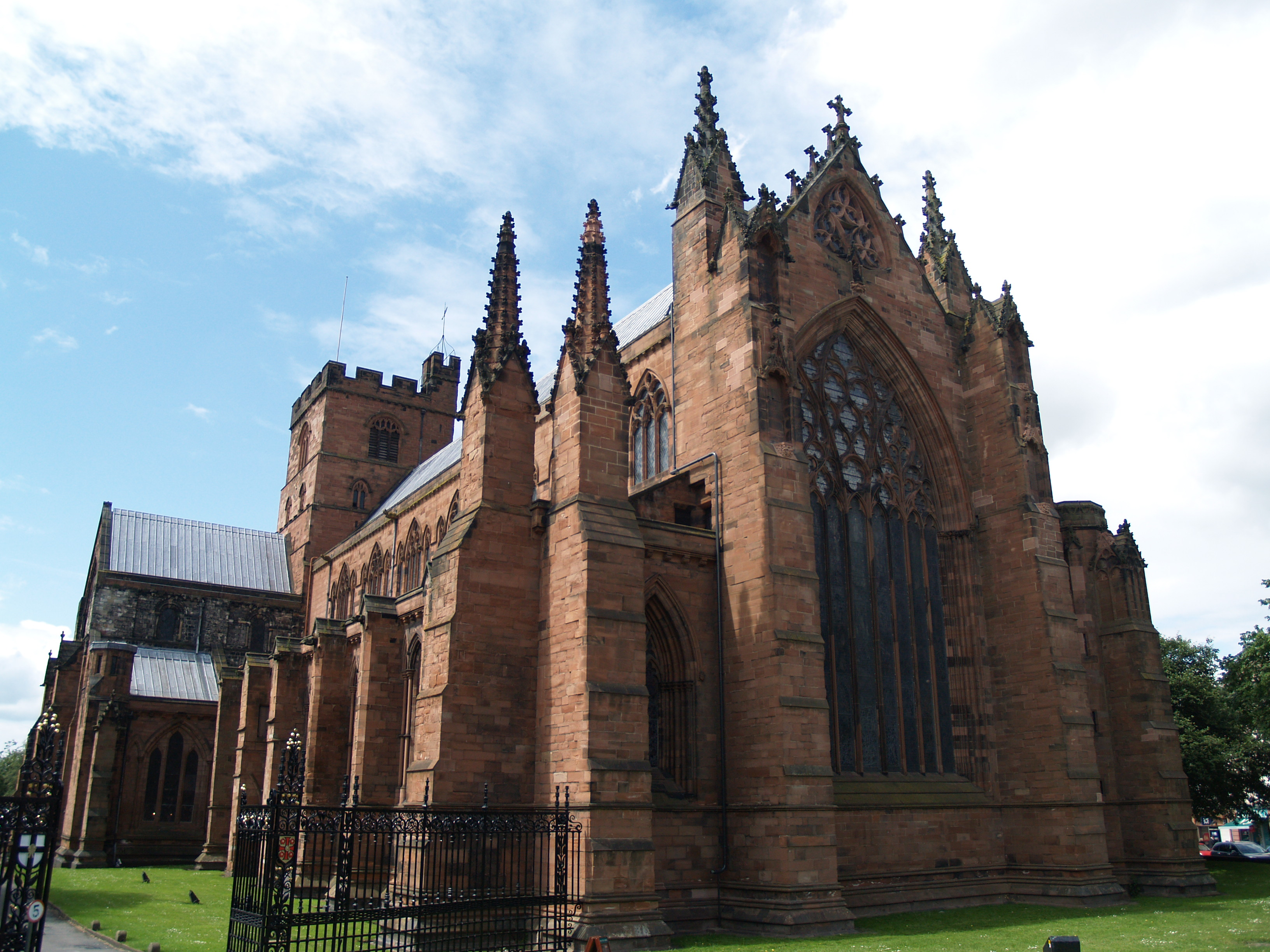
Carlisle Cathedral

The Dean of Carlisle is based in Carlisle, United Kingdom, and is the head of the Chapter of Carlisle Cathedral in the Church of England's Diocese of Carlisle. The post of Dean is currently vacant following the resignation of Jonathan Brewster in July 2025.

== List of deans ==
=== Early modern ===
- 1542–1547 Lancelot Salkeld (last prior)
- 1548–1554 Thomas Smith
- 1554–1560 Lancelot Salkeld (again)
- 1560–1577 Thomas Smith (again)
- 1577–1596 John Wolley
- 1596–1622 Christopher Perkins
- 1622–1626 Francis White
- 1626–1629 William Peterson (afterwards Dean of Exeter)
- 1629–1654 Thomas Comber
- 1660–1672 Guy Carleton
- 1672–1684 Thomas Smith
- 1684–1686 Thomas Musgrave
- 1686–1704 William Grahme (afterwards Dean of Wells)
- 1704–1711 Francis Atterbury
- 1711–1713 George Smalridge
- 1713–1716 Thomas Gibbon
- 1716–1727 Thomas Tullie
- 1727–1735 George Fleming
- 1734–1763 Robert Bolton
- 1764 Charles Tarrant (afterwards Dean of Peterborough, 1764–1791)
- 1764–1778 Thomas Wilson
- 1778–1782 Thomas Percy
- 1782–1791 Jeffery Ekins

=== Late modern ===
- 1792–1820 Isaac Milner
- 1820–1844 Robert Hodgson
- 1844–1848 John Cramer
- 1848 Samuel Hinds
- 1849–1856 Archibald Campbell Tait
- 1856–1881 Francis Close
- 1882–1884 John Oakley
- 1884–1905 William Henderson
- 1906–1908 Charles Ridgeway
- 1908–1917 William Barker
- 1917–1924 Hastings Rashdall
- 1924–1933 Henry Stuart
- 1933–1938 Cecil Cooper
- 1938–1942 Frederick Matheson
- 1943–1959 Cyril Mayne
- 1960–1973 Lionel du Toit
- 1973–1987 John Churchill
- 1988–1998 Henry Stapleton
- 1999–2003 Graeme Knowles
- 2004–2022 Mark Boyling (retired 30 September 2022)
- 2023–2025 Jonathan Brewster
