= Carlisle Cathedral =

- Cathedral Church of the Holy and Undivided Trinity in Carlisle
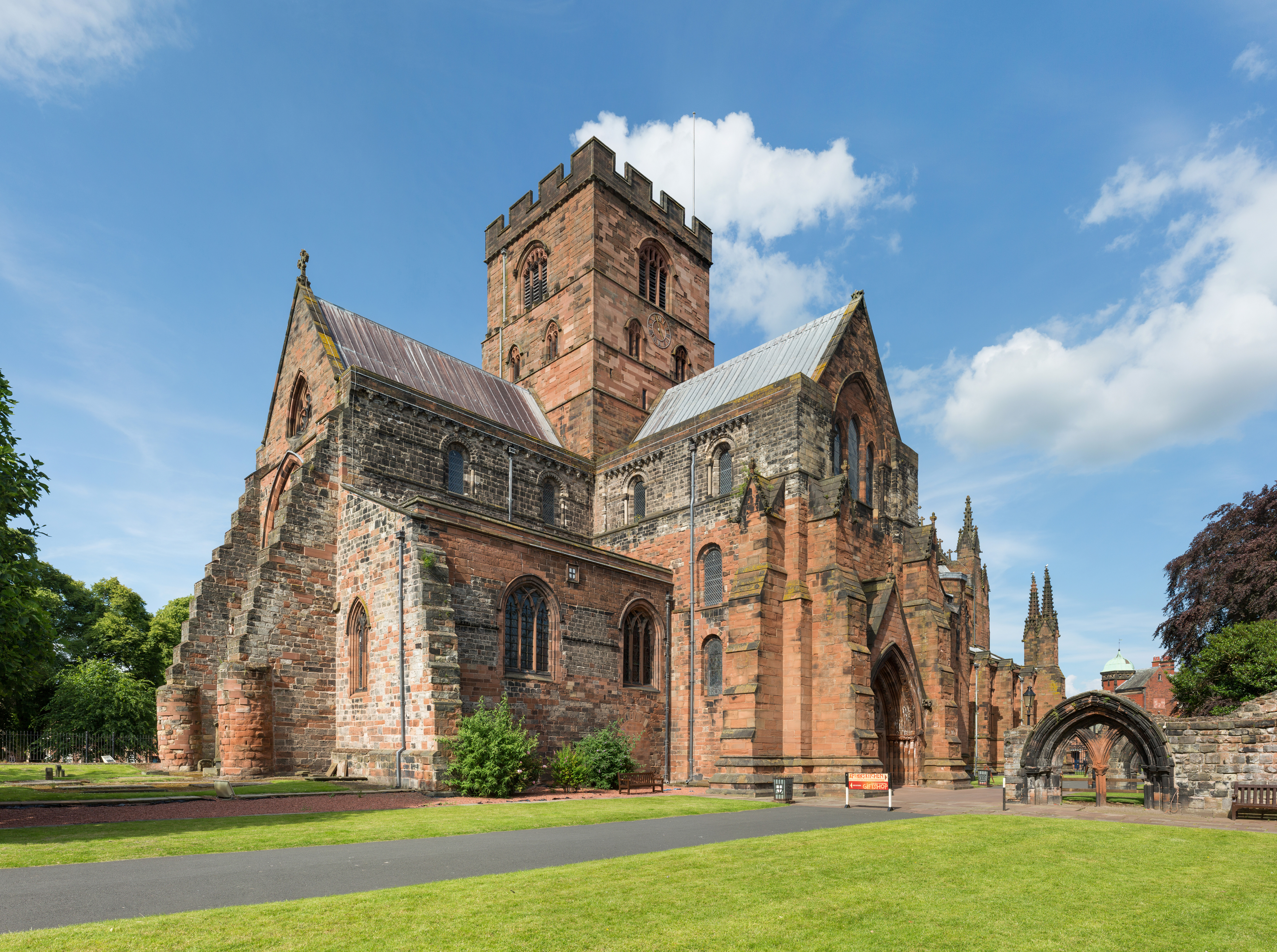
- West side of the cathedral
- Carlisle Cathedral
- 54°53′41″N 2°56′19″W
- OS grid reference: NY 39905 55959
- Location: Carlisle, Cumbria
- Country: England
- Denomination: Church of England
- Previous denomination: Roman Catholic
- Tradition: High church
- Website: carlislecathedral.org.uk

Architecture
- Heritage designation: Grade I
- Designated: 1 June 1949
- Style: Norman, Gothic

Administration
- Province: Province of York
- Diocese: Carlisle (formed 1133)

Clergy
- Bishop: Right Reverend Robert Saner-Haigh
- Dean: Michael Everitt (Interim Dean)

Listed Building – Grade I
- Official name: Cathedral Church of the Holy and Undivided Trinity
- Designated: 1 June 1949
- Reference no.: 1208430

Carlisle Cathedral, formally the Cathedral Church of the Holy and Undivided Trinity in Carlisle, is a Grade I listed Anglican cathedral in the city of Carlisle, Cumbria, England. It was founded as an Augustinian priory and became a cathedral in 1133. It is also the seat of the Bishop of Carlisle.

Carlisle is the second smallest of England's ancient cathedrals. Its notable features include figurative stone carving, a set of medieval choir stalls and the largest window in the Flowing Decorated Gothic style in England.

== History ==
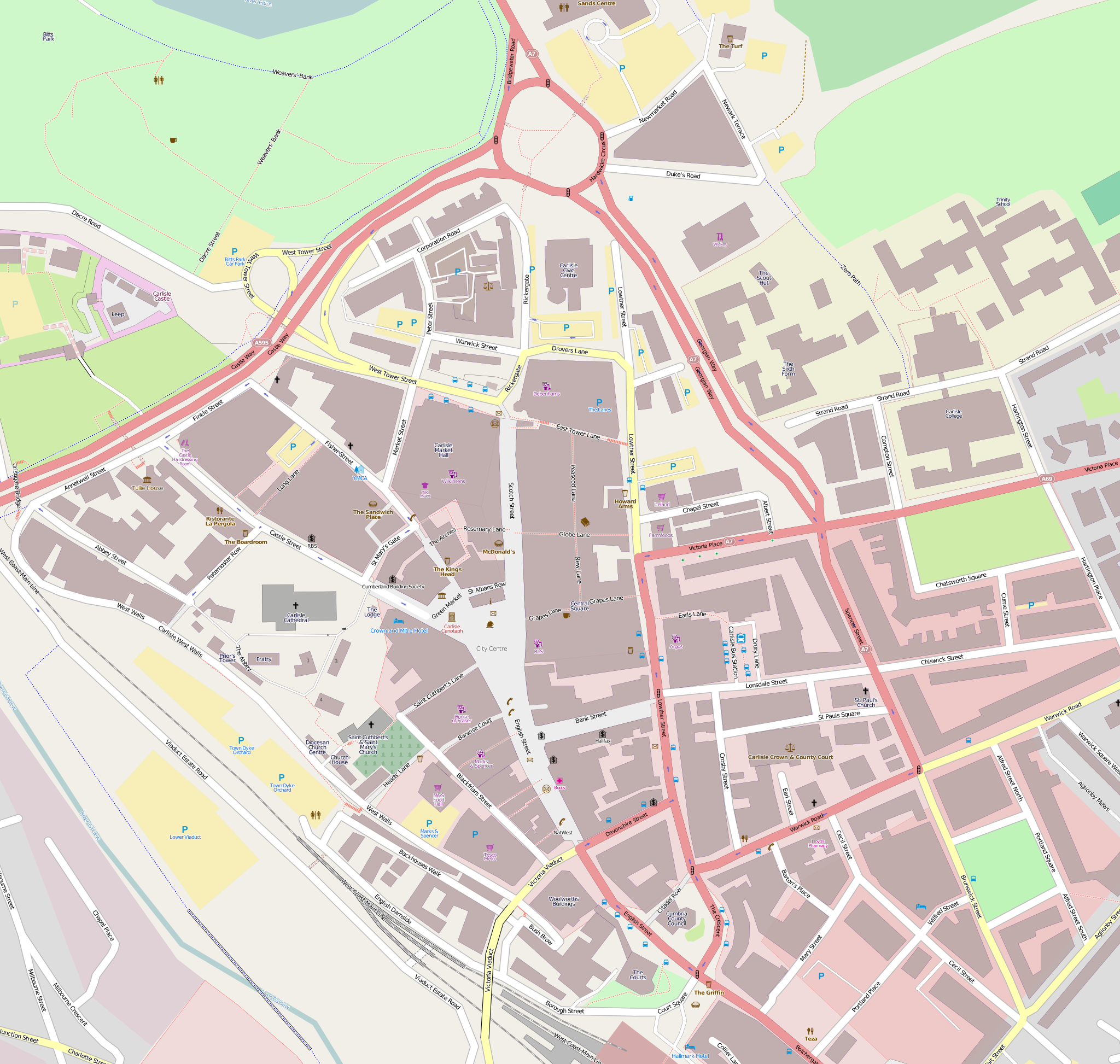
Locations of former monastic houses in Carlisle

Carlisle Cathedral was founded in 1122, during the reign of King Henry I, as a community of Canons Regular following the reform of the Abbey of Arrouaise in France, which followed a strict form of the canonical life, influenced by the ascetic practices of the Cistercians. Many large churches of Augustinian foundation were built in England during this period as the Archbishop of Canterbury, William de Corbeil, was a member of this order, but Carlisle is one of only four Augustinian churches in England to become a cathedral, most monastic cathedrals being Benedictine. The church was begun by Athelwold, an Englishman, who became the first prior. In 1133, the church was raised to the status of cathedral and Athelwold became the first Bishop of Carlisle (1133–55). In 1233, the cathedral priory community were joined by two friaries in the city. A Dominican friary and a Franciscan friary were founded close to the cathedral. The building was refurbished in the 13th and 14th centuries, receiving impetus from the presence of the court of Edward I in 1307.

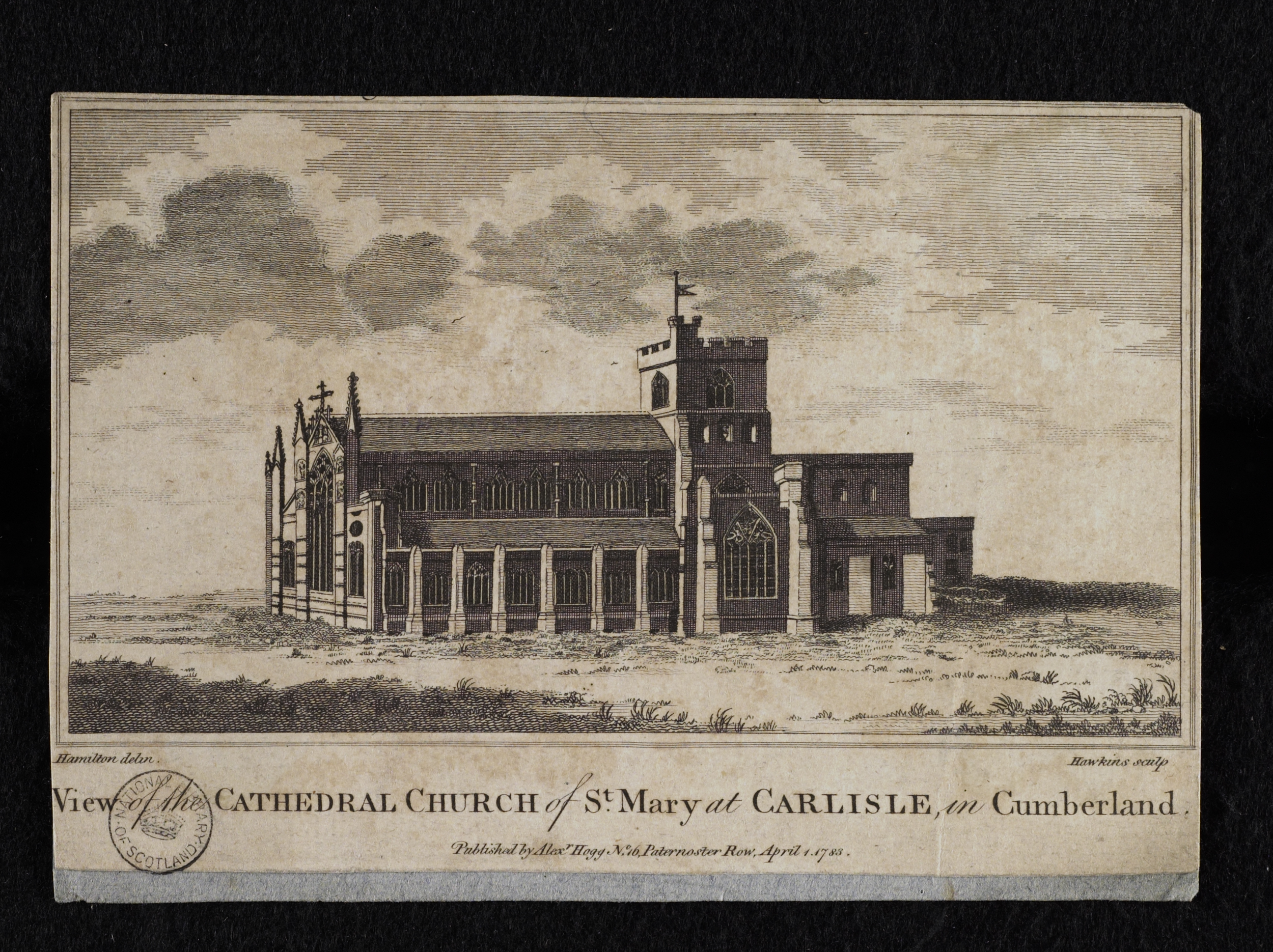
Cathedral Church of St. Mary at Carlisle, 1783

In the 15th and early 16th centuries, the monastic buildings were renewed. With the Dissolution of the Monasteries from 1536, and the establishment by Henry VIII of the Church of England as the country's official church, the Dominican and Franciscan friaries were dissolved and Carlisle cathedral was run by a secular chapter like the cathedrals at Lincoln and York, which practice has continued to this day. In 1646, during the English Civil War, a portion of the nave of the cathedral was demolished by the Scottish Presbyterian Army in order to use the stone to reinforce Carlisle Castle. The nave was thus reduced to just two bays in length. The building served two ecclesiastical functions, being both a cathedral and the parish church for the parish of Carlisle St Mary, which covered part of the city and extended into the rural area beyond; the parish congregation used the short nave of the cathedral as its parish church.

Between 1853 and 1870 Carlisle Cathedral was restored by Ewan Christian. In the early 19th century, the cathedral became the subject for a geometric analysis by Robert William Billings.

== Architecture ==
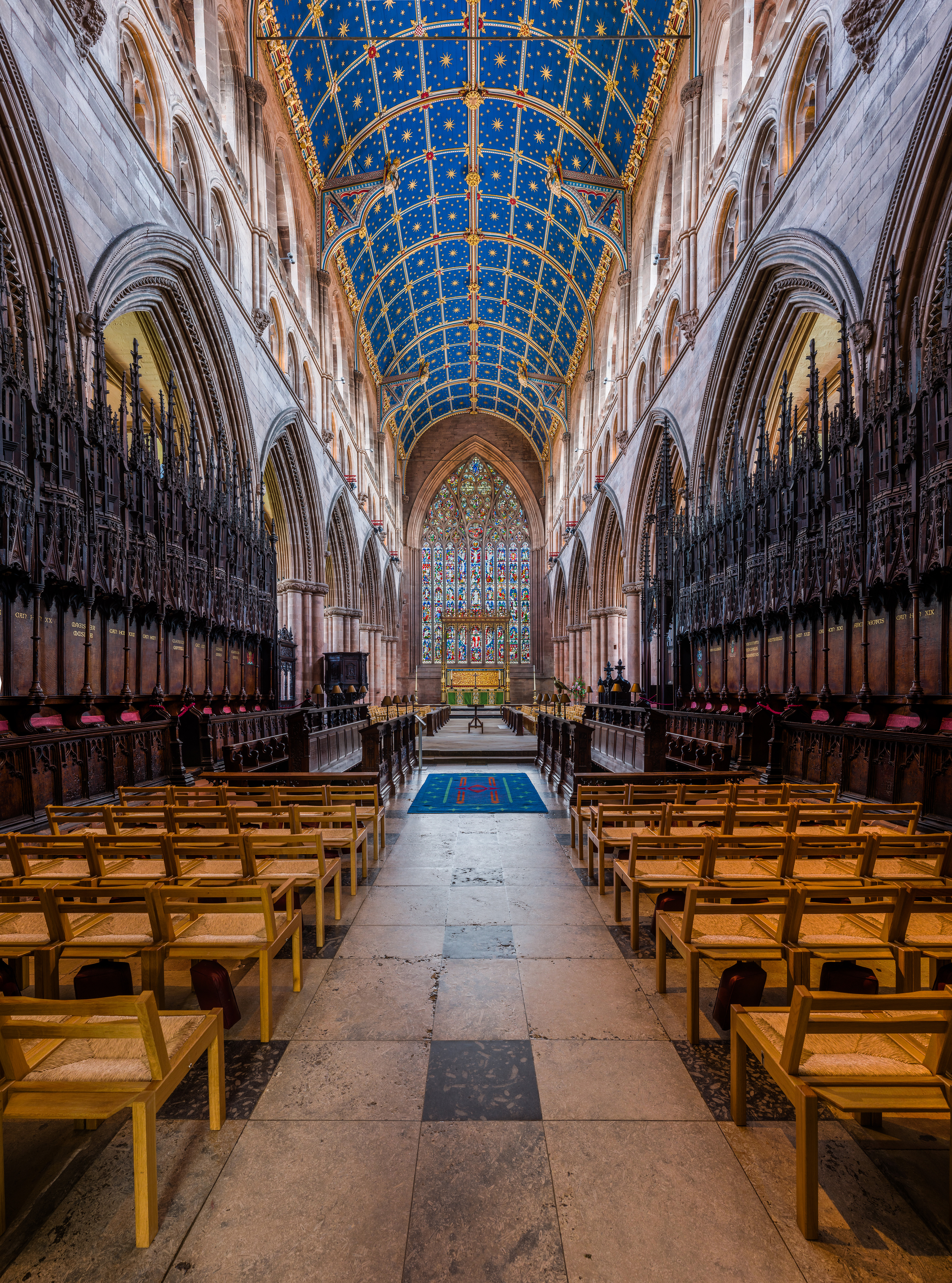
The view from the 14th-century choir looking towards the east window – one of the finest examples of Flowing Decorated tracery

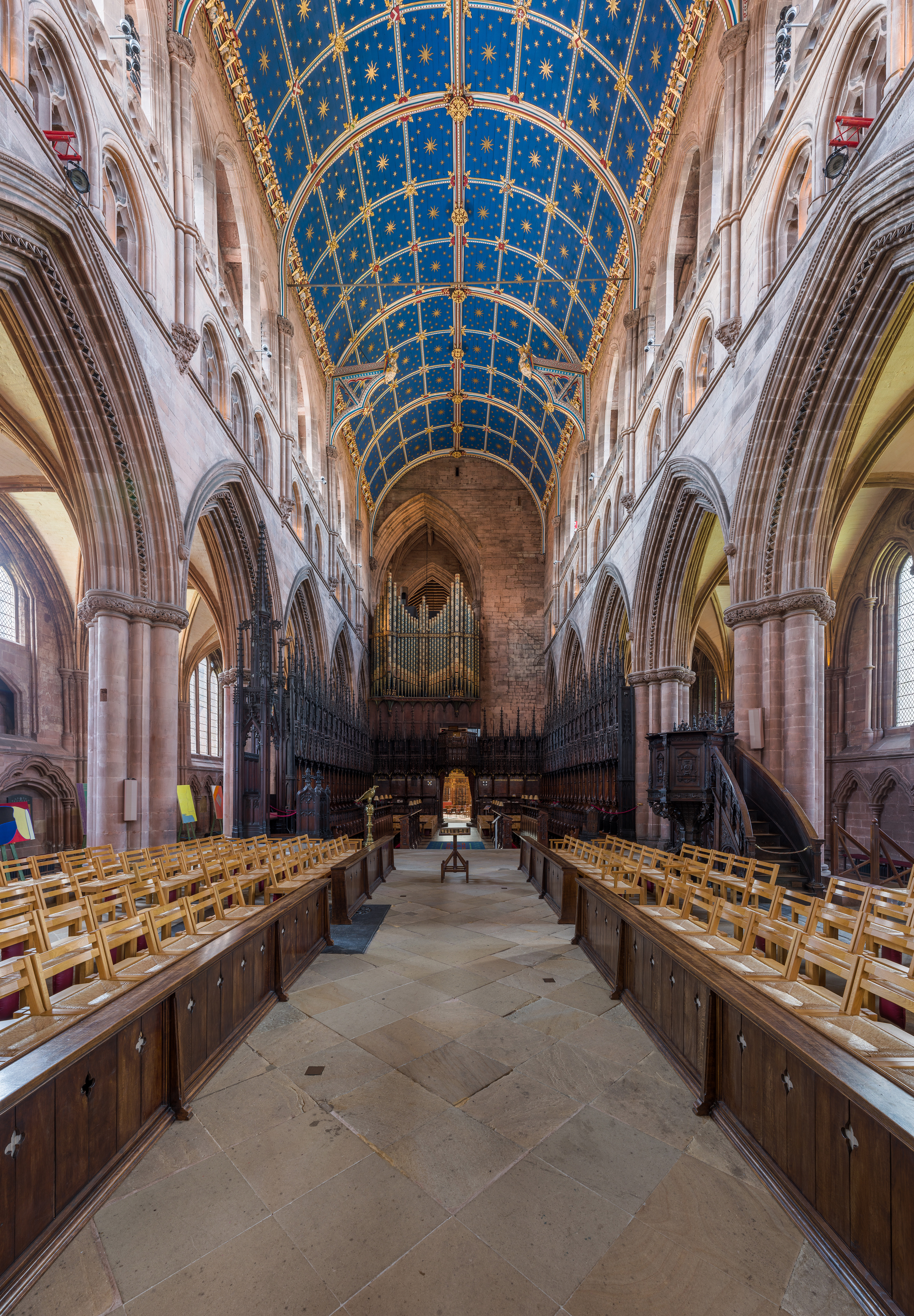
The view from the altar looking west towards the choir and organ

Carlisle Cathedral was commenced in 1123 as a monastic church, possibly on the foundations of an earlier church, in the Norman architectural style with solid masonry, large round piers, round arches and smallish round headed windows. These features may still be seen in the south transept and the remaining two bays of the nave, which are now used as the Chapel of the Border Regiment. The stone is the local red sandstone, which has discoloured almost to black on parts of the exterior. The building has also suffered from subsidence which is evidenced by the piers, which lean at different angles.

In the 13th century, the choir of the cathedral was rebuilt in the Gothic style, wider than the original and on a different axis. However, the new work was severely damaged in a fire in 1292, and the work was recommenced. By 1322 the arcades and the easternmost bay were complete, with the elaborate tracery and glass of the east window being in place by about 1350. The upper stages of the walls were finished, probably by the architect John Lewen who died in about 1398. The Gothic arcade has richly moulded arches with dog-tooth decoration, and the twelve capitals are carved with vegetation along with small lively figures representing the labours of the months.

The choir is roofed by a fine wooden barrel ceiling dating from the 14th century. In 1856 this was restored and repainted to a new design by Owen Jones. It is thought the eastern bays of the cathedral never received a stone vault because at some point the central spire blew down, and funds were required to rebuild the damaged tower and north transept, completed in about 1420.

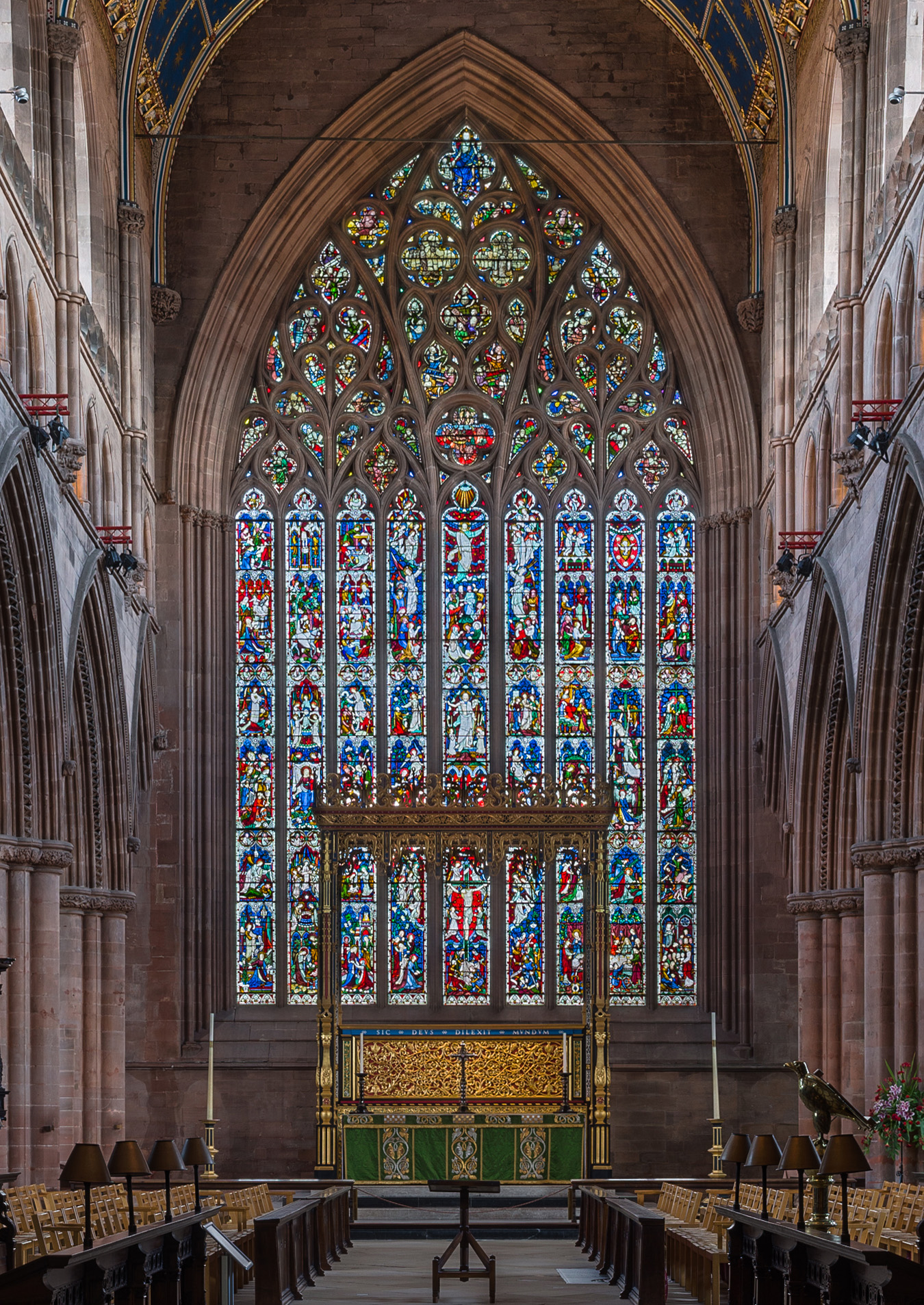
The tracery and stained glass of the East Window

The most significant architectural feature of Carlisle Cathedral is its East Window. The tracery of this window is in the most complex of English Gothic styles, Flowing Decorated Gothic. It is the largest and most complex such window in England, being 51 feet high and 26 feet wide. It has nine lights, and tracery, which, it has been calculated, was drafted from 263 points. The tracery of the window still contains much of its original medieval glass, though that in the main lights is Victorian.

Carlisle Cathedral has a fine set of 46 carved wooden choir stalls with misericords, which were installed in the early 15th century. Misericords are hinged seats, "constructed to keep the monks from falling asleep while at prayers", and carved with numerous figures and creatures. Despite their purpose, the "pillars supporting the canopies bear traces of having been burnt, by weary monks who dropped off to sleep in the midst of their interminable devotions while holding a lighted candle in their hands." The misericords were made out of black oak, and their backs carved with scenes of the legends of St. Anthony the Hermit, St. Cuthbert, St. Augustine, and the twelve apostles, as well as mythical themes. The misericords of Carlisle include typical iconography of "half-length angels, beasts deriving from the Bestiary, hybrid creatures, and narrative scenes, including the inverted world theme of the Woman beating a Man that no decent set of misericords could be without."

The delicate gilt canopy over the high altar is a modern work designed by Sir Charles Nicholson.

In common with other monasteries, the medieval monks' accommodation stood around a cloister to the south of the church. To the east of the cloister were the dormitory and octagonal chapter house. These are now ruined, with the chapter house's tiled floor surviving below ground. To the south stands the refectory or dining hall, now called the Fratry. It was rebuilt in c.1500. The £3.4 million Fratry Project commenced in 2019 to add a new extension designed by architects Feilden Fowles. The western range of the cloister, which would have contained the stores, has vanished entirely. The claustral complex as a whole seems to have suffered greatly in the Civil War, when, like the nave, it was demolished for stone.

Beyond the cloister, the cathedral stands within a close, formerly the priory's courtyard. This is entered through the Gatehouse of 1527. The deanery incorporates a 15th-century pele tower, called The Prior's Tower, containing a fine contemporary painted ceiling. To the south-east, above the West Walls, the late 15th-century tithe barn survives, now in use as an events venue by St Cuthbert's Church.

Dimensions:
Total length	239 ft	73m
Total width	141 ft	43 m
Internal height	72 ft	22 m
Height of tower	110 ft	33.5 m

=== Historic listing designations ===
The cathedral is a Grade I listed building, the highest grade. The other Grade I listed buildings within the cathedral precincts are fragments of the abbey and priory which originally stood on the site including: the abbey gate and gatehouse; the Prior's Tower and the deanery; the fratry, and the ruins of a dormitory. Buildings listed at the next highest grade, II*, include: the registry; and No.s 2, 3 and 6, The Abbey. Buildings listed at Grade II include: the remains of a wall of the priory; gates and railings at the cathedral's eastern end; and No.s 1 and 4, The Abbey.

== Dean and chapter ==
As of 3 October 2022:

- Dean — Jonathan Brewster (since 30 September 2023)
- Canon Missioner — Michael Manley (since 2007)
- Canon Warden — Benjamin Cartner (since 2021 installation)
- Diocesan Canon — vacant since 7 October 2019 (most recently Diocesan Director of Ordinands)

== Music ==
=== Organ ===
The earliest documented organ at Carlisle Cathedral is one mentioned in an inventory of 1571. The present organ was built by Henry Willis in 1856 and was innovative for its date. It was enlarged in 1875 to include the 32-foot pipes. In 1906 it was further extended by Harrison & Harrison. In 1930, the organ was moved to its present position by an unknown builder. In 1962, J. W. Walker & Sons Ltd rebuilt the organ to give it a more classical sound. In 1997, a rebuilding by David Wells sought to restore the organ to its original Victorian tone. At this time a number of new stops were added. The organ has 4 manuals, 72 stops: Pedal 18 stops, Positive 14 stops, Great 13 stops, Swell 14 stops, Solo 13 stops.

=== Organists ===
The earliest recorded appointment of an organist at Carlisle Cathedral is of Thomas Southick in 1650. Notable organists have included the composer, astronomer and mathematician Thomas Greatorex and founder of the Royal School of Church Music, Sir Sydney Nicholson. The present organist is Ian Wicks who has acted since September 2026. A new permanent director of music will be appointed in the coming months.

=== Choirs ===
==== Carlisle Cathedral Choir ====
The Carlisle Cathedral Choir dates from the foundation of the cathedral in 1133, when four laymen and six boy choristers assisted the canons with music.

In 1545, the Cathedral Statutes provided for four lay clerks and six choristers, who were to be "boys of tender age with sonorous voices and apt at chanting".

The present Cathedral Choir consists of 16 choristers and 6 lay clerks. The choristers were originally educated at the cathedral's Choir School but this was closed in 1935, and the boys are instead drawn from local schools. There is now also a choir of 16 girl choristers, who alternate with the boys in singing three services a week, with Evensong sung daily except Saturday, and Choral Eucharist at 10.30am on Sundays. The boys and girls are aged from 8–13 years and are recruited from local schools. They are selected at voice trials held during the year and receive a thorough musical training. They are awarded an annual bursary and pocket money.

==== Carlisle Cathedral Consort ====
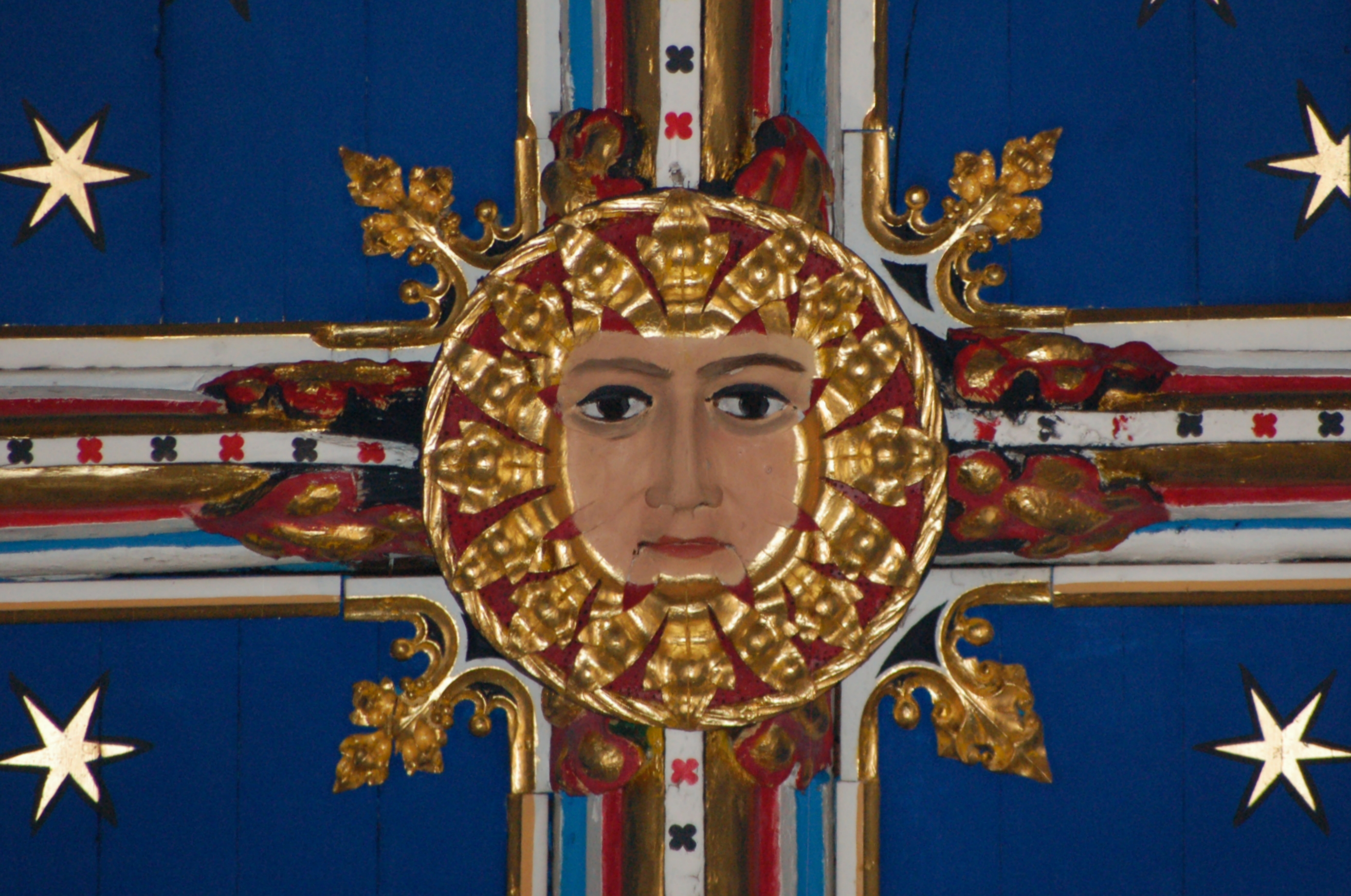
Ceiling boss in the chancel roof

The cathedral also has a choir for boys and girls aged 13–18 years who sing services in the cathedral once a week during term time. They are conducted by Edward Taylor, the Assistant Organist.

==== Carlisle Cathedral Carliol Choir ====
The Voluntary Choir, consisting of mixed voices, was formed to sing occasional services in the absence of the Cathedral and Youth Choirs.

==== Carlisle Cathedral Music Appeal ====
In 1999 the Carlisle Cathedral Music Appeal was launched with a target of £750,000 to establish a choral foundation to enable annual bursaries and free instrumental lessons to be provided for the choristers, and scholarships and vocal tuition for the choral scholars.

== Clock and chimes ==
A chiming mechanism was installed in 1747 which played “St David” at 8.00am, midday and 4.00pm. A new clock was built by Potts of Leeds and installed in the tower in 1899. In 1925 the Whitechapel foundry installed new chiming apparatus.

== Burials ==
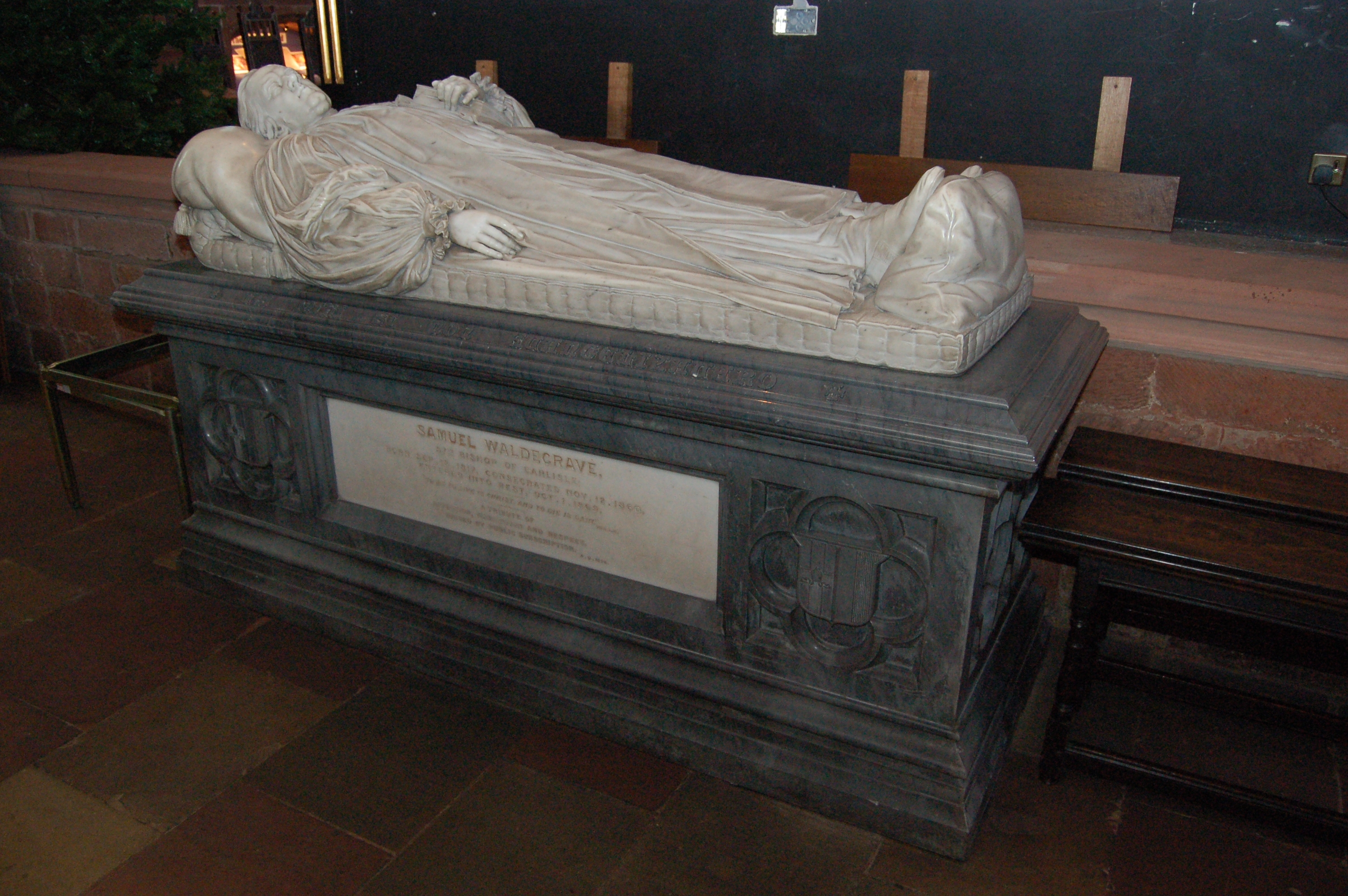
Tomb of Bishop Samuel Waldegrave

- Richard Bell (bishop), Bishop of Carlisle (1478–1495)
- Robert de Chauncy, Bishop of Carlisle (1257–1278)
- Ralph of Irton, Bishop of Carlisle (1278–1292)
- John de Halton, Bishop of Carlisle (1292–1324)
- John May, Bishop of Carlisle (1577–1598)
- William Dacre, 3rd Baron Dacre
- Richard Senhouse, Bishop of Carlisle (1624–1626) – preached the coronation sermon for Charles I in 1626
- Edmund Law, Bishop of Carlisle (1768–1787)
- Samuel Waldegrave, Bishop of Carlisle (1860–1869)

A memorial by Sir Robert Lorimer to the Border Regiment dates from 1916.

== See also ==
- Architecture of the medieval cathedrals of England
- Grade I listed buildings in Cumbria
- Grade I listed churches in Cumbria
- Listed buildings in Carlisle, Cumbria
