= Lowther family =

English gentry family

This article summarises the relationships between various members of the family of Lowther baronets.

- Sir Christopher Lowther
  - Sir John Lowther, of Lowther (d. 1637)
    - Sir John Lowther, 1st Baronet (1605–1675)
      - John Lowther (of Hackthorpe)
        - John Lowther, 1st Viscount Lonsdale
          - Richard Lowther, 2nd Viscount Lonsdale
          - Henry Lowther, 3rd Viscount Lonsdale
          - Anthony Lowther (of Lowther)
        - William Lowther (of Hackthorpe)
      - Richard Lowther (died 1703)
        - Robert Lowther (elder)
          - James Lowther, 1st Earl of Lonsdale
          - Robert Lowther (younger)
      - Ralph Lowther
        - John Lowther (of Ackworth Park)
    - Sir Christopher Lowther, 1st Baronet
      - Sir John Lowther, 2nd Baronet
        - Sir Christopher Lowther, 3rd Baronet
        - Sir James Lowther, 4th Baronet
    - William Lowther (of Swillington, elder)
      - William Lowther (of Swillington, younger)
        - Sir William Lowther, 1st Baronet (1663-1729)
          - Sir William Lowther, 2nd Baronet
        - Christopher Lowther (d. 1718)
          - Sir William Lowther, 1st Baronet (1707-1788)
            - William Lowther, 1st Earl of Lonsdale
              - William Lowther, 2nd Earl of Lonsdale
                - Francis William Lowther (illegitimate)
                  - Claude Lowther
              - Henry Cecil Lowther
                - Henry Lowther, 3rd Earl of Lonsdale
                  - St George Lowther, 4th Earl of Lonsdale
                  - Hugh Lowther, 5th Earl of Lonsdale
                  - Lancelot Lowther, 6th Earl of Lonsdale
                    - Anthony Lowther, Viscount Lowther
                      - James Lowther, 7th Earl of Lonsdale
                        - Hugh Lowther, 8th Earl of Lonsdale
                - William Lowther (diplomat)
                  - James Lowther, 1st Viscount Ullswater
                    - Christopher Lowther
                      - John Arthur Lowther (1910-1942)
                        - Nicholas Lowther, 2nd Viscount Ullswater
                  - Sir Gerard Lowther, 1st Baronet
                  - Cecil Lowther
            - Sir John Lowther, 1st Baronet (1759-1844)
              - Sir John Henry Lowther, 2nd Baronet
              - Sir Charles Hugh Lowther, 3rd Baronet
                - George William Lowther
                  - Sir Charles Lowther, 4th Baronet
                - James Lowther (of Wilton Castle)
  - Robert Lowther (d. 1655)
    - Anthony Lowther (of Marske)
      - Sir William Lowther, 1st Baronet (1670-1705)
        - Sir Thomas Lowther, 2nd Baronet
          - Sir William Lowther, 3rd Baronet
