= Lowther =

Lowther may refer to:

== Places ==
- River Lowther, Cumbria, England
- Lowther, Cumbria, civil parish in Cumbria, England
- Lowther, New Zealand, township in Southland, New Zealand
- Lowther, New South Wales, locality in Australia
- CFS Lowther, military installation on Highway 11 near Opasatika, Ontario, Canada

== People ==
- various holders of the earldom of Lonsdale – see Earl of Lonsdale.
- various holders of baronetcies created for members of the Lowther family – see Lowther baronets.
- Anthony Lowther (died 1741), youngest son of John Lowther, 1st Viscount Lonsdale
- Anthony Lowther (died 1693), English landowner, of Marske, and Member of Parliament
- Bernie Lowther (born 1950), New Zealand rugby league player
- Camilla Lowther, British fashion booking agent
- Cecil Lowther (1869–1940), British general and Conservative politician, 4th son of William Lowther
- Christopher Lowther (disambiguation), several people
- Claude Lowther (1872–1929), English Conservative politician
- Eric Lowther (born 1954), Canadian politician
- Ernest Herbert Newton Lowther (1890–1952), bird photographer in British India
- Geoffrey Lowther (fl.1422), MP for Kent
- George Lowther (pirate) (died 1723), English pirate
- George Lowther (writer) (1913–1975), American radio and TV writer, producer and director
- Gerard Lowther (Irish justice) (1589–1660), Irish justice
- Sir Gerard Lowther, 1st Baronet (1858–1916), British diplomat, ambassador in Constantinople
- Hannah Lowther (born 1997), English actress
- Henry Lowther (disambiguation), several people
- James Lowther (disambiguation), several people
- Jamie Lowther-Pinkerton (born 1960), private secretary to the Duke and Duchess of Cambridge
- John Lowther (disambiguation), several people
- John Lowther du Plat Taylor (1829–1904), British army officer, founder of the Army Postal Corps and the Post Office Rifles
- Matilda Lowther (born 1995), British fashion model
- Norman Lowther Edson (1904–1970), New Zealand professor of biochemistry
- Pat Lowther (1935–1975), Canadian poet
- Richard Lowther (died 1703), English landowner, MP for Appleby 1689–1690
- Richard Lowther, 2nd Viscount Lonsdale (1692–1713)
- Robert Lowther (colonial administrator) (1681–1745), English landowner, Governor of Barbados
- Robert Lowther (1741–1777), English Member of Parliament
- Shaun Lowther (born 1962), English-Canadian soccer player
- Toupie Lowther, English tennis player around 1900
- William Lowther (disambiguation), several people
- Zac Lowther (born 1996), American baseball player

== See also ==
- Lowther Hall Anglican Grammar School
- Lowther Lodge
- Lowther Stakes
- Pat Lowther Award
