= Lowther baronets of Whitehaven (1642) =

Escutcheon of the Lowther baronets of Whitehaven (1642)

The Lowther baronetcy, of Whitehaven in the County of Cumberland, was created in the Baronetage of England on 11 June 1642 for Christopher Lowther; he was the younger brother of Sir John Lowther, 1st Baronet, of Lowther.

He was succeeded by his son, the 2nd Baronet, who sat as Member of Parliament for Cumberland. After his death the title passed to his elder son, the 3rd Baronet, disinherited by his father. He was succeeded by his younger brother, the 4th Baronet, an industrialist and politician, who never married. On his death in 1755 the baronetcy became extinct. He left his extensive estates to his cousin Sir William Lowther, 3rd Baronet of Marske. On the latter's death in 1756, they passed to Sir James Lowther, 5th Baronet, the future Earl of Lonsdale.

== Lowther baronets, of Whitehaven (1642) ==
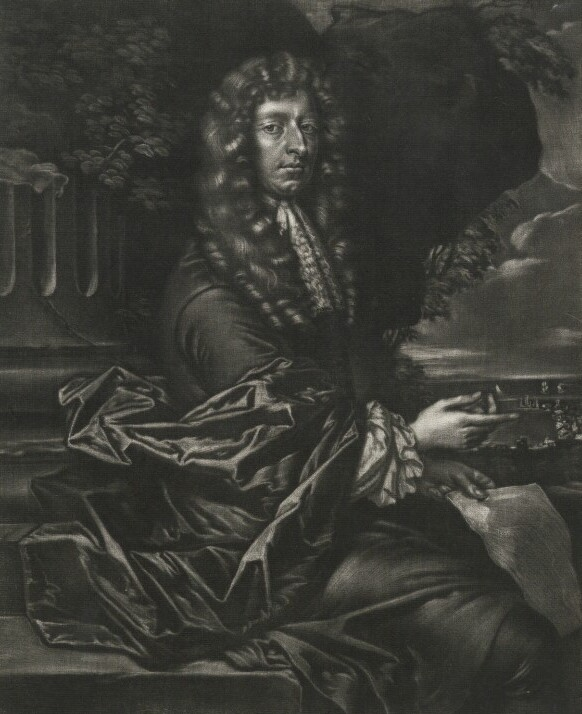
Mezzotint of Sir John Lowther, 2nd Baronet, of Whitehaven, 1684

- Sir Christopher Lowther, 1st Baronet (died 1644)
- Sir John Lowther, 2nd Baronet (1643–1706)
- Sir Christopher Lowther, 3rd Baronet (1666–1731)
- Sir James Lowther, 4th Baronet (1673–1755)
