= Charles Lowther =

Charles Lowther may refer to:

- Sir Charles Lowther, 3rd Baronet (1803–1894)
- Sir Charles Lowther, 4th Baronet (1880–1949)
- Sir Charles Douglas Lowther, 6th Baronet (b. 1946), of the Lowther Baronets
