= Lowther baronets of Marske (1697) =

Escutcheon of the Lowther baronets of Whitehaven (1642)

The Lowther baronetcy, of Marske in the County of York, was created in the Baronetage of England on 15 June 1697 for the 21-year-old William Lowther, subsequently Member of Parliament for Lancaster. His father was Anthony Lowther. He was the grandson of the London merchant Robert Lowther, brother of Sir John Lowther of Lowther Hall, the father of Sir John Lowther, 1st Baronet, of Lowther.

He was succeeded by his son, the 2nd Baronet, who also represented Lancaster in the House of Commons. On his death the title passed to his son, the 3rd Baronet, who served as Lord-Lieutenant of Westmorland. In 1755 he succeeded to the estates of his cousin Sir James Lowther, 4th Baronet, of Whitehaven; but then died unmarried, at an early age the following year when the baronetcy became extinct.

== Lowther baronets, of Marske (1697) ==
- Sir William Lowther, 1st Baronet (1670–1705)
- Sir Thomas Lowther, 2nd Baronet (died 1745)
- Sir William Lowther, 3rd Baronet (1727–1756)
