= Earl of Lonsdale =

Earldom in the Peerage of Great Britain

Earl of Lonsdale 2nd creation
- Arms: Or, six Annulets Sable, three, two and one. Crest: A Dragon passant Argent.. Supporters: On either side a Horse Argent, gored with a Wreath of Laurel Vert.
- Creation date: 7 April 1807
- Creation: Second
- Created by: George III
- Peerage: United Kingdom
- Baronetage: Lowther baronets
- First holder: William Lowther, 1st Earl of Lonsdale
- Present holder: William James Lowther, 9th Earl of Lonsdale
- Heir presumptive: James Nicholas Lowther
- Subsidiary titles: Viscount Lowther; Baron Lowther; Baronet 'of Swillington'
- Status: Extant
- Motto: MAGISTRATUS INDICAT VIRUM (The office displays the man)

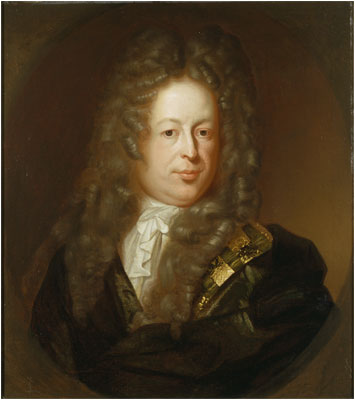
John Lowther, 1st Viscount Lonsdale

Earl of Lonsdale is a title that has been created twice in British history, firstly in the Peerage of Great Britain in 1784 (becoming extinct in 1802), and then in the Peerage of the United Kingdom in 1807, both times for members of the Lowther family.

== History of the title ==
This family descends from Sir Richard Lowther (1532–1607), of Lowther Hall, Westmorland, who served as Lord Warden of the West Marches.

=== First creation ===
His great-grandson, John Lowther, was created a baronet, of Lowther in the County of Westmorland, in the Baronetage of Nova Scotia in circa 1638. He was succeeded by his grandson, the second Baronet (the son of John Lowther, eldest son of the first Baronet). He was an influential politician and held several ministerial posts during the reign of William III. In 1696 he was raised to the Peerage of England as Baron Lowther and Viscount Lonsdale. His eldest son, the second Viscount, died unmarried at an early age and was succeeded by his younger brother, the third Viscount. He was also a prominent politician. On his death in 1751 the barony and viscountcy became extinct.

The late Viscount was succeeded in the baronetcy by his second cousin, James Lowther, the fifth Baronet. He was the son of Robert Lowther, son of Richard Lowther, second son of the first Baronet. Lowther was a Member of Parliament for over twenty years and served as Lord-Lieutenant of Westmorland and Cumberland. He inherited not only the Lowther estates in Westmorland, but also the Whitehaven estates that had recently belonged to Sir James Lowther. In 1784 he was raised to the Peerage of Great Britain as Baron Lowther, of Lowther in the County of Westmorland, Baron of the Barony of Kendal in the County of Westmorland and Baron of the Barony of Burgh in the County of Cumberland, Viscount Lonsdale, Viscount Lowther and Earl of Lonsdale, with normal remainder to the heirs male of his body. The Earl was childless and all his titles were heading for extinction. In 1797 he was therefore created Baron Lowther, of Whitehaven in the County of Cumberland, and Viscount Lowther, of Whitehaven in the County of Cumberland, with remainder to the heirs male of his deceased third cousin, Reverend Sir William Lowther, 1st Baronet, of Little Preston, to whom he also devised his considerable estates. These titles were also in the Peerage of Great Britain. On Lord Lonsdale's death in 1802, the baronetcy and the peerages of 1784 became extinct.

He was succeeded in the barony and viscountcy of 1797 according to the special remainder by his third cousin once removed, Sir William Lowther, 2nd Baronet, of Little Preston. He was the elder son of the aforementioned Reverend Sir William Lowther, 1st Baronet, of Little Preston, great-grandson of Sir William Lowther, brother of Sir John Lowther, 1st Baronet, of Lowther (see Lowther baronets for a more comprehensive history of this branch of the family).

=== Second creation ===
In 1807 the earldom of Lonsdale was revived when he was created Earl of Lonsdale, in the County of Westmorland, in the Peerage of the United Kingdom. The same year he was also made a Knight of the Garter. He was succeeded by his eldest son, the second Earl. He was a prominent Tory politician and notably served as Postmaster General and Lord President of the Council. In 1841 he was summoned to the House of Lords through a writ of acceleration in his father's junior title of Baron Lowther. He was childless and on his death the titles passed to his nephew, the third Earl. He was the eldest son of the Hon. Henry Lowther, second son of the first Earl. He represented Cumberland West in the House of Commons and served as Lord-Lieutenant of Westmorland and Cumberland. His eldest son, the fourth Earl, died without male issue at an early age and was succeeded by his younger brother, the fifth Earl. He became known as "England's greatest sporting gentleman". He was succeeded by his younger brother, the sixth Earl. As at 2021 the titles are held by the latter's grandson, the ninth Earl, who succeeded his half-brother in that year.

Numerous other members of this family have also gained distinction. John Lowther, eldest son of the first Baronet and father of the second Baronet, was Member of Parliament for Appleby. His son from his second marriage, William Lowther (who was born posthumously), sat as Member of Parliament for Carlisle. Richard Lowther, younger son of the first Baronet, was Member of Parliament for Appleby. His son Robert Lowther, the father of the fifth Baronet, was a Member of Parliament and Governor of Barbados. The Hon. Anthony Lowther, third son of the first Viscount, sat as a Member of Parliament. Sir James Lowther, 1st Baronet, of Swillington, younger brother of the first Earl of the second creation, was created a Baronet in 1824 (see Lowther baronets). Henry Lowther, second son of the first Earl of the second creation and father of the third Earl, was a Conservative politician. His third son William Lowther was a diplomat and politician. He was the father of James Lowther, 1st Viscount Ullswater (see Viscount Ullswater), Sir Gerard Lowther, 1st Baronet (see Lowther baronets) and Sir Cecil Lowther. For information on other branches of the family, see Lowther baronets.

The family seat was formerly Lowther Castle in Cumbria. However, the seventh Earl lived at nearby Askham Hall and the present Earl lives at Thrimby a few miles south-east of the castle. The traditional burial place of the Earls of Lonsdale is the Lowther Mausoleum in the Churchyard of St Michael, Lowther, Cumbria.

== Earls of Lonsdale, first creation ==
=== Lowther baronets, of Lowther (c. 1638) ===
- Sir John Lowther, 1st Baronet (1605–1675)
  - John Lowther (1628–1668)
- Sir John Lowther, 2nd Baronet (1655–1700) (created Viscount Lonsdale in 1696)

=== Viscounts Lonsdale (1696) ===
- John Lowther, 1st Viscount Lonsdale, 2nd Baronet (1655–1700)
- Richard Lowther, 2nd Viscount Lonsdale, 3rd Baronet (1692–1713)
- Henry Lowther, 3rd Viscount Lonsdale, 4th Baronet (1694–1751)

=== Lowther baronets, of Lowther (c. 1638; reverted) ===
- Sir James Lowther, 5th Baronet (1736–1802) (created Earl of Lonsdale in 1784)

=== Earls of Lonsdale (1784) ===
- James Lowther, 1st Earl of Lonsdale (1736–1802) (created Viscount Lowther in 1797)

== Earls of Lonsdale, second creation ==
=== Viscounts Lowther (1797) ===
- James Lowther, 1st Earl of Lonsdale, 1st Viscount Lowther (1736–1802)
- William Lowther, 2nd Viscount Lowther (1757–1844) (created Earl of Lonsdale in 1807)

=== Earls of Lonsdale (1807) ===
- William Lowther, 1st Earl of Lonsdale (1757–1844)
- William Lowther, 2nd Earl of Lonsdale (1787–1872)
- Henry Lowther, 3rd Earl of Lonsdale (1818–1876)
- St George Henry Lowther, 4th Earl of Lonsdale (1855–1882)
- Hugh Cecil Lowther, 5th Earl of Lonsdale (1857–1944)
- Lancelot Edward Lowther, 6th Earl of Lonsdale (1867–1953)
  - Anthony Edward Lowther, Viscount Lowther (1896–1949)
- James Hugh William Lowther, 7th Earl of Lonsdale (1922–2006)
- Hugh Clayton Lowther, 8th Earl of Lonsdale (1949–2021)
- William James Lowther, 9th Earl of Lonsdale (b. 1957)

== Present peer ==
William Lowther, Earl of Lonsdale (born 9 July 1957), is the younger son of the 7th Earl by his second wife Jennifer Lowther, a cousin. In 1999 he married Angela Ann Tinker, a daughter of Arthur Tinker. On 22 June 2021, he succeeded to the peerages and baronetcy and to an estate of some 30,000 acres (120 km^{2}).

The heir presumptive is the present holder's half-brother, James Nicholas Lowther (born 1964), whose heir apparent is his second son, Flynn St George Lowther (born 2005), due to the suicide of his elder son in 2022.

== Line of succession ==
- William Lowther, 1st Earl of Lonsdale (1757–1844)
  - William Lowther, 2nd Earl of Lonsdale (1787–1872)
  - Henry Cecil Lowther (1790–1867)
    - Henry Lowther, 3rd Earl of Lonsdale (1818–1876)
      - St George Lowther, 4th Earl of Lonsdale (1855–1882)
      - Hugh Lowther, 5th Earl of Lonsdale (1857–1944)
      - Charles Lowther (1859–1888)
      - Lancelot Lowther, 6th Earl of Lonsdale (1867–1953)
        - Anthony Lowther, Viscount Lowther (1896–1949)
          - James Lowther, 7th Earl of Lonsdale (1922–2006)
            - Hugh Lowther, 8th Earl of Lonsdale (1949–2021)
            - William Lowther, 9th Earl of Lonsdale (b. 1957)
            - (1) James Lowther (b. 1964)
              - James Lowther (2000–2022)
              - (2) Flynn Lowther (b. 2005)
            - (3) Charles Lowther (b. 1978)
          - Anthony Lowther (1925–1981)
            - (4) Thomas Lowther (b. 1966)
              - (5) Anson Lowther (b. 1998)
        - Timothy Lancelot Lowther (1925–1984)
    - Arthur Lowther (1820–1855)
    - William Lowther (1823–1912)
      - James Lowther, 1st Viscount Ullswater (1855–1949)
        - Christopher Lowther (1887–1935)
          - John Lowther (1910–1942)
            - (6) Nicholas Lowther, 2nd Viscount Ullswater (b. 1942)
              - (7) Benjamin Lowther (b. 1975)
                - (8) Nikolas Lowther (b. 2009)
              - (9) Edward Lowther (b. 1981)
        - Arthur Lowther (1888–1967)
      - Sir Gerard Lowther of Belgrave Square, 1st Baronet (1858–1916)
      - Harold Lowther (1864–1929)
      - Sir Cecil Lowther (1869–1940)

== See also ==
- Viscount Ullswater
- Lowther baronets
- Lonsdale Road, Oxford, named after the Earldom

== Sources ==
- Chisholm, Hugh, ed. (1911). "Lonsdale, Earls of" . Encyclopædia Britannica. Vol. 16 (11th ed.). Cambridge University Press. p. 987.
- Kidd, Charles, Williamson, David (editors). Debrett's Peerage and Baronetage (1990 edition). New York: St Martin's Press, 1990.
