= John Lowther =

John Lowther may refer to:

- Sir John Lowther of Lowther Hall (died 1637), Member of Parliament for Westmorland (UK Parliament constituency)
- Sir John Lowther, 1st Baronet, of Lowther (1605–1675), Member of Parliament for Westmorland 1660–1661
- John Lowther (d. 1668) (c. 1628 – 1668), Member of Parliament for Appleby 1661–1668
- Sir John Lowther, 2nd Baronet, of Whitehaven (1643–1706), Member of Parliament for Cumberland 1665–1701
- John Lowther, 1st Viscount Lonsdale (1655–1700), Member of Parliament for Westmorland 1677–1679 and 1681–1696
- John Lowther (d. 1729), Member of Parliament for Pontefract 1722–1729
- Sir John Lowther, 1st Baronet, of Swillington (1759–1844), Member of Parliament for Carlisle, Cockermouth, Cumberland, and Haslemere
- Sir John Lowther, 2nd Baronet, of Swillington (1793–1868), Member of Parliament for Cockermouth, Wigtown, and York
- John Luke Lowther, (1923–2011), soldier, politician and Lord Lieutenant of Northamptonshire
