= Viscount Ullswater =

Viscountcy in the Peerage of the United Kingdom

- Creation date: 2 August 1921
- Created by: George V
- Peerage: United Kingdom
- First holder: James Lowther
- Present holder: Nicholas Lowther
- Heir apparent: Hon. Benjamin Lowther
- Remainder to: Heirs male of the first viscount's body lawfully begotten
- Status: Extant

Viscount Ullswater, of Campsea Ashe in the County of Suffolk, is a title in the Peerage of the United Kingdom. It was created in 1921 for James Lowther upon his retirement as Speaker of the House of Commons. He was the eldest son of the Hon. William Lowther, third son of the Hon. Henry Lowther, second son of William Lowther, 1st Earl of Lonsdale (see Earl of Lonsdale and Lowther baronets for earlier history of the family).

The first Viscount lived to the age of 93, and was pre-deceased by both his eldest son, the Hon. Christopher Lowther, a Conservative politician, and his eldest son's eldest son John Arthur Lowther (1910–1942) (who was Private Secretary to Prince George, Duke of Kent and was killed in the same air crash as him), the title being inherited by his seven-year-old great-grandson, the second and current Viscount, in an extremely rare instance of a great-grandson succeeding his great-grandfather in a peerage.

The second Viscount held office in the Conservative administrations of Margaret Thatcher and John Major and since 2003 he has been one of the ninety elected hereditary peers that remain in the House of Lords after the passing of the House of Lords Act 1999.

Two of the first Viscount's younger brothers also gained distinction. Sir Gerard Lowther, 1st Baronet, was a diplomat and Sir Cecil Lowther a soldier and politician.

== Viscount Ullswater (1921) ==
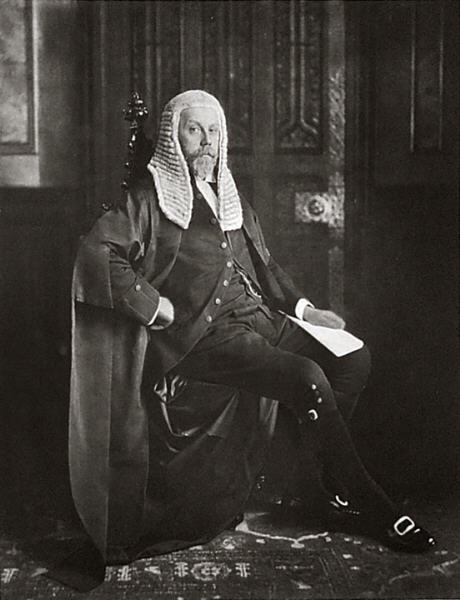
James Lowther, 1st Viscount Ullswater

- James William Lowther, 1st Viscount Ullswater (1855–1949)
  - Hon. Christopher William Lowther (1887–1935)
  - John Arthur Lowther (1910–1942)
- Nicholas James Christopher Lowther, 2nd Viscount Ullswater (born 1942)

The heir apparent is the present holder's eldest son, the Hon. Benjamin James Lowther (born 1975).
The heir apparent to the heir apparent is his son Nikolas (born 2009).

== Arms ==
Coat of arms of Viscount Ullswater
Crest A dragon passant Argent. Escutcheon Or six annulets three two and one and in chief a crescent for difference all Sable. Supporters On either side a horse Argent gorged with a wreath of laurel Vert and charged on the shoulder with a portcullis chained Or. Motto Magistratum Indicat Virum (The Office Shows The Man)

== See also ==
- Earl of Lonsdale
- Lowther baronets

== Literature ==
- Kidd, Charles; Williamson, David, eds. (1990). Debrett's Peerage and Baronetage (1990 ed.). New York: St Martin's Press.
- Leigh Rayment's Peerage Pages
