= Christopher Lowther =

Christopher Lowther may refer to:

- Christopher Lowther of Little Preston (died 1718), younger son of Sir William Lowther, ancestor of the Earls of Lonsdale
- Sir Christopher Lowther, 1st Baronet (died 1644)
- Sir Christopher Lowther, 3rd Baronet (1666–1731)
- Christopher Lowther (politician) (1887–1935), Conservative MP for North Cumberland 1918–1921
