= Marske Hall =

Grade I listed house in North Yorkshire, England

Coordinates: 54.593°N 1.022°W

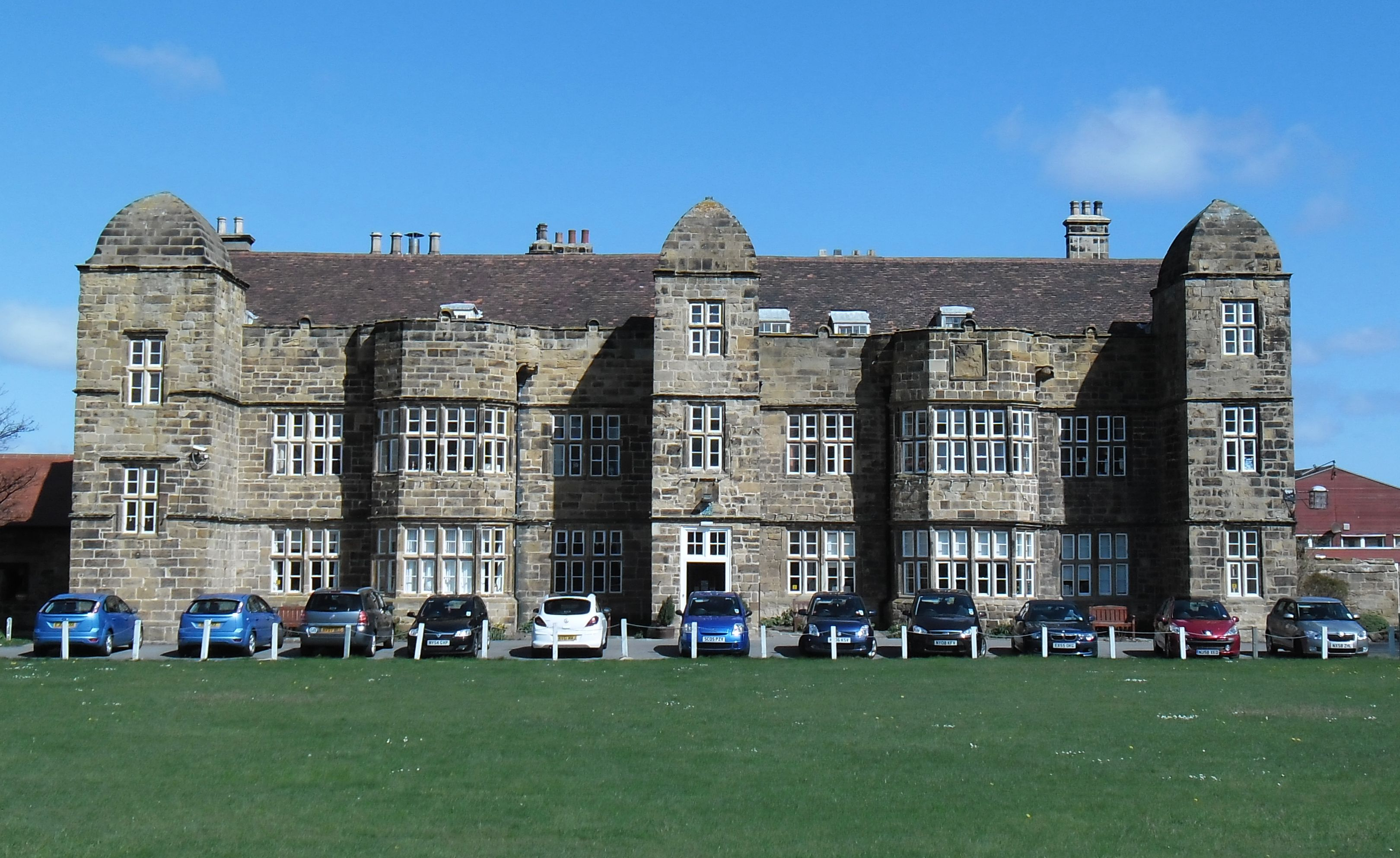
Marske Hall

Marske Hall is a 17th-century former mansion house, now a Valorum Care Group residential care home, in Marske-by-the-Sea, Redcar and Cleveland, England. It has Grade I listed building status.

The building is constructed of squared stone in two storeys to an E-shaped plan with tiled roofs and a nine bay frontage which incorporates two three storey turrets. The facade, which twice incorporates the arms of the Pennyman family, is little changed to this day.

== History ==
The Manor of Marske was purchased in 1616 by William Pennyman, who built the imposing mansion in 1625. He was made 1st Baronet Pennyman of Marske in 1628 and appointed High Sheriff of Yorkshire in 1635–36. On his death in 1643 the manor passed to his half-brother James, who was made 1st Baronet Pennyman of Ormesby in 1664. In the Civil War James Pennyman was a Royalist and created an army made of his tenants, which was involved in a battle against Oliver Cromwell on Marske beach in 1643. Cromwell, keen to gain a foothold in this part of the world, tried to land a party of men on the seafront near to the village, and was successfully repelled by Sir James and his army. For this delinquency he was convicted and fined £1200, a burden which may have contributed to his decision to sell the estate to the Lowther family in 1650.

William Lowther (1676–1705) was made 1st Baronet Lowther of Marske and was elected MP for Lancaster in 1702. His only son Thomas, the 2nd baronet, was elected MP for Lancaster in 1727. The latter's son, William, the 3rd baronet, was MP for Cumberland in 1755 and died unmarried in 1756, leaving Marske to four Wilson brothers.

The estate was acquired by Thomas Dundas, 1st Baron Dundas from the Wilsons in 1762. His son Lawrence was a Member of Parliament for Richmond and also served as Lord Lieutenant of Orkney and Shetland. He was ennobled in 1838 as Earl of Zetland and died at Aske Hall in 1839. Marske descended via Thomas Dundas, 2nd Earl of Zetland (whose horse Voltigeur won both The Derby and St Leger Stakes in 1850) to Lawrence Dundas, 3rd Earl of Zetland, who was elevated to Marquess of Zetland in 1892 and died in 1929. The last person to live at the hall was the Dowager Lady Zetland who died in 1943 at the age of 92.

During the Great War, the Hall was used by the Royal Flying Corps and during World War II by the army. In 1948, it was made into a private school, but was damaged in 1957 after pupils played with gunpowder. The building was then abandoned for a few years, until in 1961 Lord Zetland donated it to the Leonard Cheshire Foundation. It was opened in 1963 as a residential care home providing nursing care for 30 disabled people. In 2019 the home was sold to Valorum Care Group and continues as a residential care home.

== Bibliography ==
- A History of the County of York North Riding: Volume 2 (1923) pp399-405 from British History on Line
