= James Lowther =

James Lowther may refer to:

- Sir James Lowther, 4th Baronet (1673–1755), Member of Parliament for Appleby, Carlisle, and Cumberland
- James Lowther, 1st Earl of Lonsdale (1736–1802), electoral magnate in northern England, Member of Parliament for Cockermouth, Cumberland, Haslemere and Westmorland
- Colonel James Lowther (1753–1837), Member of Parliament for Appleby, Haslemere and Westmorland
- James Lowther (politician, born 1840) (1840–1904), Tory politician and sportsman, sometime Chief Secretary for Ireland, Member of Parliament for the Isle of Thanet, Lincolnshire North, and York
- James Lowther, 1st Viscount Ullswater (1855–1949), Conservative politician and Speaker of the House of Commons
- James Lowther, 7th Earl of Lonsdale (1922–2006), British peer
