= Lowther baronets of Swillington (first creation, 1715) =

Escutcheon of the Lowther baronets of Swillington (1715)

The Lowther baronetcy, of Swillington in the County of York, was created in the Baronetage of Great Britain on 6 January 1715 for William Lowther II, Member of Parliament for Pontefract; His father William Lowther I had also been Member of Parliament for Pontefract. His grandfather was Sir William Lowther, brother of Sir John Lowther, 1st Baronet, of Lowther and Sir Christopher Lowther, 1st Baronet of Whitehaven, and the uncle of Sir William Lowther, 1st Baronet, of Little Preston.

He was succeeded by his elder son, the 2nd Baronet, who was also Member of Parliament for Pontefract. On his death in 1763 the baronetcy became extinct. John Lowther, younger son of the first Baronet, was Governor of Surat.

== Lowther baronets, of Swillington (1715) ==
- Sir William Lowther, 1st Baronet (1663–1729)
- Sir William Lowther, 2nd Baronet (died 1763)

== Notes ==
Baronetage of Great Britain
Preceded by Fryer baronets	Lowther baronets of Swillington; 6 January 1715	Succeeded by Carew baronets
