= Alexander Drummond =

Alexander Drummond may refer to:

- Alexander Drummond (cricketer) (1888–1937), English cricketer
- Alexander Drummond (consul) (died 1769), English consul
- Alexander Drummond (programmer) from Symphony OS
- Alex Drummond, The Bill character
