= William Lowther =

William Lowther may refer to:

== Politicians ==
- William Lowther (died c.1421), MP for Cumberland (UK Parliament constituency)
- William Lowther (MP for Appleby), in 1420, MP for Appleby (UK Parliament constituency)
- Sir William Lowther (died 1688) (c. 1612–1688), Member of Parliament for Pontefract 1661–1679
- Sir William Lowther (1639–1705), Member of Parliament for Pontefract 1695–1698
- Sir William Lowther, 1st Baronet, of Swillington (1663–1729), Member of Parliament for Pontefract 1701–1710 and 1716–1729
- William Lowther (1668–1694), Member of Parliament for Carlisle 1692–1694
- Sir William Lowther, 1st Baronet, of Marske (1676–1705), Member of Parliament for Lancaster 1702–1705
- Sir William Lowther, 2nd Baronet (c. 1694–1763), Member of Parliament for Pontefract 1729–1741
- Sir William Lowther, 3rd Baronet (1727–1756), Member of Parliament for Cumberland 1755–1756
- William Lowther, 1st Earl of Lonsdale (1757–1844), Member of Parliament for Carlisle, Cumberland and Rutland
- William Lowther, 2nd Earl of Lonsdale (1787–1872), Member of Parliament for Cockermouth, Dunwich, West Cumberland and Westmorland
- William Lowther (diplomat) (1821–1912), Member of Parliament for Appleby 1885–1892 and Westmorland 1868–1885

== Others ==
- Sir William Lowther, 1st Baronet, of Little Preston (1707–1788), English landowner and curate
