= Hugh Lowther =

Hugh Lowther may refer to:

- Hugh Lowther, 5th Earl of Lonsdale (1857–1944)
- Hugh Lowther, 8th Earl of Lonsdale (born 1949)
