= Lowther baronets of Little Preston (1764) =

Escutcheon of the Lowther baronets of Little Preston

The Lowther baronetcy, of Little Preston in the County of York, was created in the Baronetage of Great Britain on 22 August 1764 for Reverend William Lowther. He was the great-grandson of Sir William Lowther, and the nephew of Sir William Lowther, 1st Baronet, of Swillington. He was succeeded by his eldest son, the 2nd Baronet. In 1802 he succeeded his third cousin once removed James Lowther, 1st Earl of Lonsdale, who was a great-grandson of Sir John Lowther, 1st Baronet, of Lowther, as 2nd Viscount Lowther according to a special remainder in the letters patent. In 1807 the earldom of Lonsdale was revived in his favour.

== Lowther baronets, of Little Preston (1764) ==
- Sir William Lowther, 1st Baronet (1707–1788)
- Sir William Lowther, 2nd Baronet (1757–1844) (succeeded as Viscount Lowther in 1802 and created Earl of Lonsdale in 1807)

For later holders, see Earl of Lonsdale.

== Notes ==
Baronetage of Great Britain
Preceded by Gordon baronets	Lowther baronets of Little Preston; 22 August 1764	Succeeded by Pigot baronets
