= Carew baronets of Beddington (1715) =

Escutcheon of the Carew baronets of Antony

The Carew baronetcy, of Beddington in the County of Surrey, was created in the Baronetage of Great Britain on 11 January 1715 for Nicholas Carew, Member of Parliament for Haslemere and Surrey.

The title became extinct on the death of his son, the 2nd Baronet, in 1762.

== Carew baronets, of Beddington (1715) ==
- Sir Nicholas Carew, 1st Baronet (1687–1727)
- Sir Nicholas Hacket Carew, 2nd Baronet (c.1716–1762)

== Notes ==
Baronetage of Great Britain
Preceded by Lowther baronets	Carew baronets of Beddington; 11 January 1715	Succeeded by Janssen baronets
