= Sir William Duncan, 1st Baronet =

Scottish physician

Sir William Duncan, 1st Baronet (died 1 September 1774) was a Scottish physician. He was a fashionable society doctor in London, and physician in ordinary to George III of Great Britain.

== Life ==
He was the brother of Alexander Duncan of Lundie, Forfarshire, and uncle of Adam Duncan, 1st Viscount Duncan.

Duncan graduated M.D. from the University of St Andrews in 1751. He attended George III, becoming physician in ordinary in 1760, taking the place in the new reign of Frank Nicholls; and was created a baronet of Marylebone in the County of Middlesex on 9 August 1764. He treated the king in his first illness (1765).

In partnership with a Scottish physician, Andrew Turnbull, he obtained land grants in Florida, where they planned a new settlement, New Smyrna, using indentured labour from the Mediterranean and Negro slaves. In 1768 eight ships set off from Minorca with more than a thousand settlers on board, but on arrival they found conditions deplorable.

Duncan was elected a Fellow of the Royal Society in 1771. Towards the end of his life he moved abroad, passing his practice to Sir John Eliot. He died at Naples, on 1 September 1774.

The large investment he had made at New Smyrna was lost a few years later in 1777 when the surviving indentured settlers deserted New Smyrna en masse.

== Family ==
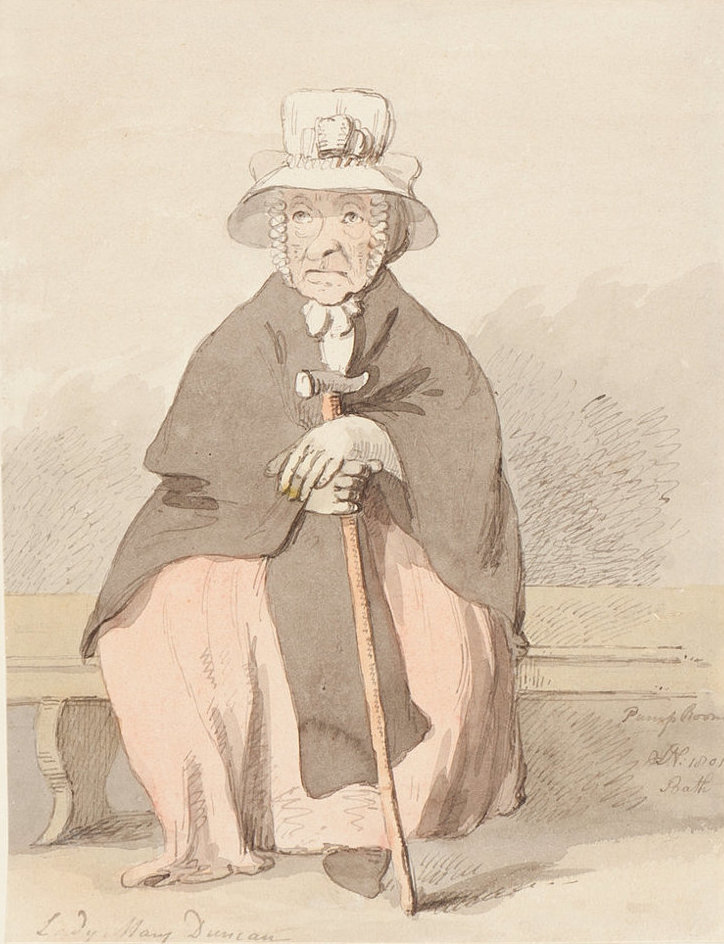
Lady Mary Duncan

In 1763, Duncan married Lady Mary Tufton, daughter of Sackville Tufton, 7th Earl of Thanet. He left no son, and the baronetcy died with him. Lady Mary was born in 1723, and died in 1806. She was noted for her high wigs, and supposed infatuation with Gaspare Pacchierotti.

== Notes ==
Baronetage of Great Britain
New creation	Baronet (of Marylebone); 1764–1774	Extinct
Preceded by Amyand baronets	Duncan baronets of Marylebone; 9 August 1764	Succeeded by Gordon baronets
