= Sir Charles Lowther, 3rd Baronet =

Sir Charles Hugh Lowther, 3rd Baronet (26 September 1803 – 6 November 1894) was an English landowner, the third son of Sir John Lowther, 1st Baronet and Lady Elizabeth Fane.

Lowther was blind from infancy due to an attack of scarlet fever. His mother imported the first embossed books in England for his benefit in 1821.

On 10 May 1834, he married Isabella Morehead (died 2 July 1887). They had two sons:

- George William Lowther (28 March 1837 – 6 February 1890)
- James Lowther (1840–1904), who inherited Wilton Castle from his father.

Lowther was a benefactor of William Moon, funding the construction of his workroom in 1856 and donating to the Moon Society, which distributed literature for the blind in Moon type.

He inherited the family baronetcy from his brother in 1868. Dying in 1894 at the age of ninety, Lowther was succeeded in the baronetcy by his grandson, Charles Bingham Lowther. Sir Charles' coach can be seen in the carriage collection at Shibden Hall, Halifax.

Baronetage of the United Kingdom
Preceded by John Henry Lowther	Baronet (of Swillington); 1868–1894	Succeeded by Charles Bingham Lowther
