= Robert Cunninghame Graham of Gartmore =

British poet and politician (1735–1797)

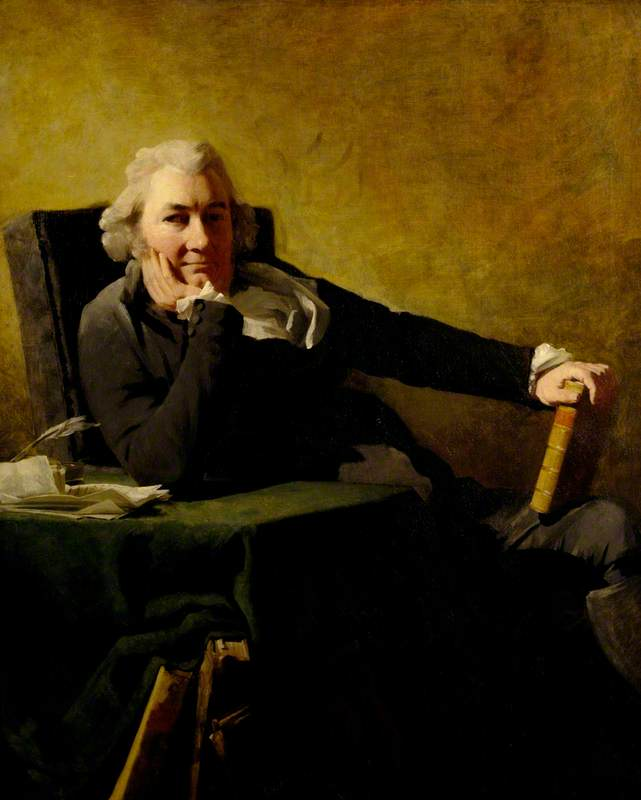
Portrait of Graham by Henry Raeburn

Robert Cunninghame Graham of Gartmore (born Robert Graham; 1735 – 11 December 1797) was a British poet and politician. He is now remembered for a poem If doughty deeds my lady please, which was later set to music by Sir Arthur Sullivan and also by his great-great-grandson, Rev. Malise Cunninghame Graham.

== Early life ==
Robert, the second son of Nicol Graham of Gartmore and Lady Margaret Cunninghame, was born at Gartmore, Perthshire, and educated, along with his elder brother William, at the University of Glasgow (matriculating under Professor Andrew Rosse).

In 1752, Graham left Britain for the Colony of Jamaica and spent the next 17 years there, becoming a planter, slave-owner, and merchant who profited from his involvement in sugar plantations in the Caribbean. By 1753, at just 18 years of age, he had become receiver-general of taxes.

== Slave holder in Jamaica ==
As a wealthy businessman, Graham acquired slaves as domestic servants, oversaw large groups of enslaved plantation workers and later sold the slaves he owned when he returned to Scotland. Graham writes in his letters of numerous liaisons with enslaved women and this infers he is likely to have fathered children by them.

Graham represented the parish of St David in the Assembly of Jamaica (1765–67). He left Jamaica for Britain in 1770 take up his lairdship of Ardoch in Dunbartonshire, having succeeded to the estate (entailed upon him in 1757), on the death of his first cousin once removed, William Bontine, earlier that year.

== Family and marriage ==
While in Jamaica, Graham married Anne Taylor, daughter of Patrick Tailzour and Martha Taylor and sister of Sir John Taylor Baronet of Lyssons Hall, in 1764 (as recorded in the Cunninghame Graham Family Bible) and Simon Taylor, one of Jamaica's wealthiest merchants and plantation-owners.

He built the current Ardoch House (near Dumbarton) in colonial style for his wife, Anne, to replace the ruinous Ardoch Castle he had inherited from his Bontine cousin.

Anne died in December 1780, leaving two daughters and two sons. He secondly married Elizabeth Buchanan circa 1783, by whom he had a further son and daughter; they separated in 1787 and divorced in 1789.

== Property ==
He changed name twice; firstly, under the terms of an entail by which he inherited the Ardoch estate from William Bontine, he took the surname Bontine until his father died. Secondly, in line with the 1709 entail of William 12th Earl of Glencairn, he assumed the name and arms of Cunninghame, in addition to those of Graham, on the death in 1796 of Maj. Gen. John Cunninghame, 15th Earl of Glencairn and last in line.

From him Robert inherited the Finlaystone estate, so that he is often known as Robert Cunninghame Graham of Gartmore and Finlaystone. At his death, his estates stretched from Perthshire (Gartmore & Kippen), through Dunbartonshire (Gallingad & Ardoch) and across the Clyde to Renfrewshire (Finlaystone); in addition he held the lands of Lochwood in Lanarkshire and his Jamaican plantation at Roaring River.

== Political career ==
Graham was elected a Member of Parliament, representing Stirlingshire, in 1794. He was a pro-Jacobin of that time, and identified as a Radical. During his time in the House he attempted to introduce a Bill of Rights which foreshadowed the Reform Bill of 1832.

He was a close friend of Thomas Sheridan, Charles James Fox, Sir Thomas Dundas (later 1st Baron Dundas) and the poet Hector McNeil.

Graham was appointed Rector of the University of Glasgow, holding the position from 1785 to 1787, in which year he instituted the Gartmore Gold Medal (awarded biennially) for the best discourse by a student on political liberty.

== Death and legacy ==
In later life he suffered from frequent bouts of gout in the organs. He died at Gartmore on 1 December 1797 and was interred on 4 December in the Gartmore family burial ground.

Robert Burns – whose patron James, 14th Earl of Glencairn, was Graham's first cousin – writing to the Edinburgh bookseller, Mr Hill, describes Graham as: "...the noblest instance of great talents, great fortune and great worth that ever I saw in conjunction."

== Descendants ==
Graham's great-great-grandson, Robert Bontine Cunninghame Graham was a writer, journalist and adventurer. He was also a notable politician, being a Liberal Party MP. and a founder of both the Scottish Labour Party and the National Party of Scotland.

His great-great-great-grandson, Admiral Sir Angus Edward Malise Bontine Cunninghame Graham of Gartmore and Ardoch KBE CB was Royal Navy Flag Officer, Scotland. He was nephew and heir to Robert Bontine Cunningham Graham.

== Footnotes ==
Academic offices
Preceded by Edmund Burke	Rector of the University of Glasgow; 1785–1787	Succeeded by Adam Smith
Parliament of the United Kingdom
Preceded by Sir Thomas Dundas	Member of Parliament for Stirlingshire; 1794–1796	Succeeded by Sir George Keith Elphinstone
