= Sir Thomas Lowther, 2nd Baronet =

English landowner

Sir Thomas Lowther, 2nd Baronet (20 April 1699 – 23 March 1745) was an English landowner, dwelling at Marske Hall, Yorkshire. He was the only son of Sir William Lowther, 1st Baronet and Catherine Preston.

On 2 July 1723, he married Lady Elizabeth Cavendish, daughter of William Cavendish, 2nd Duke of Devonshire, and had one son:

- Sir William Lowther, 3rd Baronet (1727–1756)

He was thought to be the probable legatee of Sir James Lowther, 4th Baronet, and his alcoholism was concealed from Sir James by the rest of the family for fear he would be disinherited. In the event, Sir James survived him by a decade.

Parliament of Great Britain
Preceded by Dodding Bradyll; William Heysham	Member of Parliament for Lancaster; 1722–1745; With: William Heysham 1722–1727; Christopher Tower 1727–1734; Robert Fenwick 1734–1745	Succeeded by Robert Fenwick; Francis Reynolds
Baronetage of England
Preceded by William Lowther	Baronet (of Marske); 1705–1745	Succeeded by William Lowther
