= George Drummond (cricketer) =

English cricketer (1883–1963)

High Sheriff of Northamptonshire
- In office 1927–1928
- Preceded by: Sir Charles Lowther, 4th Baronet
- Succeeded by: Cecil John Cokayne Maunsell

Personal details
- Born: George Henry Drummond; 3 March 1883 Pimlico
- Died: 12 October 1963 (aged 80) Kirk Braddan, Isle of Man
- Spouse(s): Helena Kathleen Holt (m. 1917; died 1933) Honora Myrtle Gladys Spiller (m. 1940)
- Relations: Alexander Drummond (brother)
- Children: 8

George Henry Drummond, later known as George Henry de Vere Drummond (3 March 1883 – 12 October 1963), was an English banker. He had been a cricketer who was active from 1903 to 1922, when he played for Northamptonshire (Northants).

== Early life ==
Drummond was born in Pimlico on 3 March 1883. He was a son of George James Drummond, a British banker and member of the Drummonds Bank family, and Elizabeth Cecile Sophia (née Norman) Drummond. He was the elder brother of Alexander Drummond. In 1902, his name was legally changed to George Henry de Vere Drummond by Royal Licence.

His maternal grandparents were the Rev. Frederick John Norman and Lady Adeliza Elizabeth Gertrude Manners, who was a daughter of John Manners, 5th Duke of Rutland, and Elizabeth Manners, Duchess of Rutland.

He appeared in fifteen first-class matches as a righthanded batsman, who scored 186 runs with a highest score of 34.

== Career ==
Drummond served as a Lieutenant in the West Kent Yeomanry and Nottinghamshire Royal Horse Artillery. He fought in World War I, where he was wounded. He was partner and chairman of Drummond's Bank, and he was appointed as High Sheriff of Nottinghamshire in 1927.

During the 1930s, Drummond was a member of the British fascist circles. In the early years of the decade, he attempted to form the British Movement. He was a close associate of Admiral Barry Domvile (who described him as "madly pro-German and anti-Jew") and Major-General J. F. C. Fuller. He also entertained the Prince of Wales and the Duke of York at his house Pitsford Hall near Northampton. In 1938, he became president of the Northampton branch of The Link, a pro-Nazi organisation, and joined the Right Club in 1939. During the Phoney War he played a leading role in talks between The Link and the British People's Party. In May 1940, as part of the new war cabinet's crackdown on British Nazi sympathisers, he was interrogated and accepted self-exile to his mansion Mount Rule in the Isle of Man, where he remained after the war.

He was Member of the House of Keys in the Isle of Man between 1946 and 1951.

== Personal life ==
On 11 January 1917, Drummond married Helena Kathleen Holt, a daughter of Thomas Grattan Holt and sister of civil engineer Herbert Samuel Holt. Before her death in 1933, they were the parents of:

- Eve de Vere Drummond (1918–1987), who married Raymond Vincent de Trafford (1900–1971), son of Sir Humphrey de Trafford and formerly one of the 1920s Happy Valley set of Kenya.
- Rosemary Lucia de Vere Drummond (1919–1968), who married Lieutenant-Colonel Neil Phipps Foster.
- Edwina Gillian de Vere Drummond (born 1920), who married Commandant Eric R. Miville.
- Diana Kathleen Drummond (1926–1982), who married John Astor, MP for Newbury who was the youngest son of John Jacob Astor, 1st Baron Astor and Lady Violet Elliot-Murray-Kynynmound.

On 30 October 1940, he married Honora Myrtle Gladys Spiller, daughter of Lt.-Col. Duncan Wilfred Lambart Spiller. Together, they were the parents of:

- Annabella Elizabeth Sarah de Vere Drummond (born 1941)
- George Albert Harley de Vere Drummond (born 1943), a London banker, father of director Sir Matthew Vaughn.
- Omega Margaret de Vere Drummond (born 1944), who married Robert Armand Yves Pouget, aka Baron Pouget de St Victor.
- Isobel Camilla de Vere Drummond (born 1946)

Drummond died in Kirk Braddan, Isle of Man on 12 October 1963.

== Sources ==
- Griffiths, Richard (2017), What Did You Do During the War? The Last Throes of the British Pro-Nazi Right, 1940–45, London: Routledge, ISBN 9781138888968

Honorary titles
| Preceded by Sir Charles Lowther, 4th Baronet | High Sheriff of Northamptonshire; 1927 | Succeeded by Cecil John Cokayne Maunsell |
