= Gordon baronets of Newark-upon-Trent (1764) =

Escutcheon of the Gordon baronets of Newark-upon-Trent

The Gordon baronetcy of Newark-upon-Trent, Nottinghamshire was created in the Baronetage of Great Britain on 21 August 1764 for the physician Samuel Gordon, High Sheriff of Nottinghamshire in 1761. He married Elizabeth Bradford, niece of Sir Matthew Jenison.

== Gordon baronets of Newark-upon-Trent, Nottinghamshire (1764) ==
- Sir Samuel Gordon, 1st Baronet (died 1780)
- Sir Jenison William Gordon, 2nd Baronet (1747–1831).

The baronetcy became extinct on 9 May 1831 on the death of the 2nd Baronet without issue.

== Notes ==
Baronetage of Great Britain
Preceded by Duncan baronets	Gordon baronets of Newark-upon-Trent; 21 August 1764	Succeeded by Lowther baronets
