= Pauline Chase =

American actress (1885–1962)

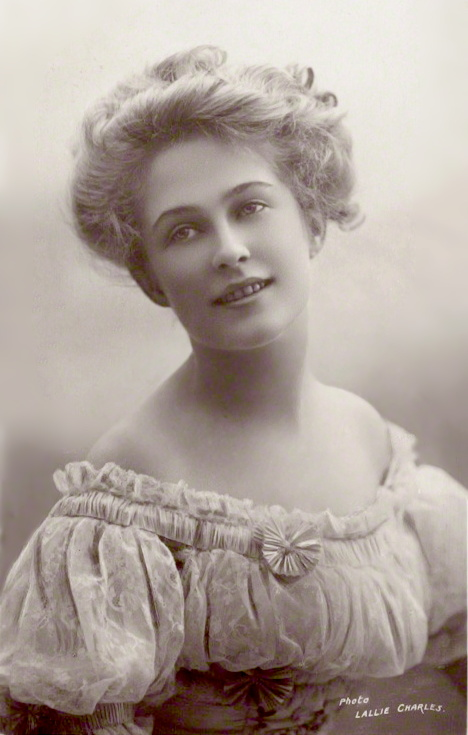
- Chase c. 1905
- Born: Pauline Bliss; May 20, 1885; Washington, D.C., U.S.
- Died: March 15, 1962 (aged 76); Royal Tunbridge Wells, Kent, England
- Spouse: Alexander Victor Drummond (m. 1914; died 1937)
- Children: 3

Pauline Chase (born Pauline Bliss; May 20, 1885 – March 15, 1962) was an American actress who performed on the stage in both the United States and the United Kingdom. She added the names "Ellen" and "Matthew" to hers when she was baptised in the Church of England in 1906, from her godparents, the actress Ellen Terry and author James Matthew Barrie. She is known for her extended run in the title role of British productions of Peter Pan, or The Boy Who Wouldn't Grow Up. She was also known as the Pocket Venus of New York.

== Biography ==
Pauline Chase was born Pauline Bliss in Washington, D.C., on May 20, 1885, the daughter of Dr. Ellis Bliss. She was schooled at the Convent of the Sisters of the Holy Cross in New York.

She began acting at the age of 15. She played one of the Lost Boys in the debut of Peter Pan in London in 1904. She was later selected by producer Charles Frohman and playwright J. M. Barrie for the title role, which she played from 1906 to 1913. The Peter Pan costume she wore for the productions of the play is on display at the Museum of London.

She first came to the attention of Charles Frohman when he opened his production of the musical play "The Girl from Up There", starring Edna May, at the Herald Square theatre in January 1901. By the time he transferred his production to the Duke of York's Theatre in London's West End in April that year, he had recruited Pauline onto the cast. She was still only fifteen years of age when she made that first crossing of the Atlantic to appear on the London stage. That production was only a moderate success, but, returning to the USA in September, she proved a sensation as the Pink Pajama Girl in "The Liberty Belles".

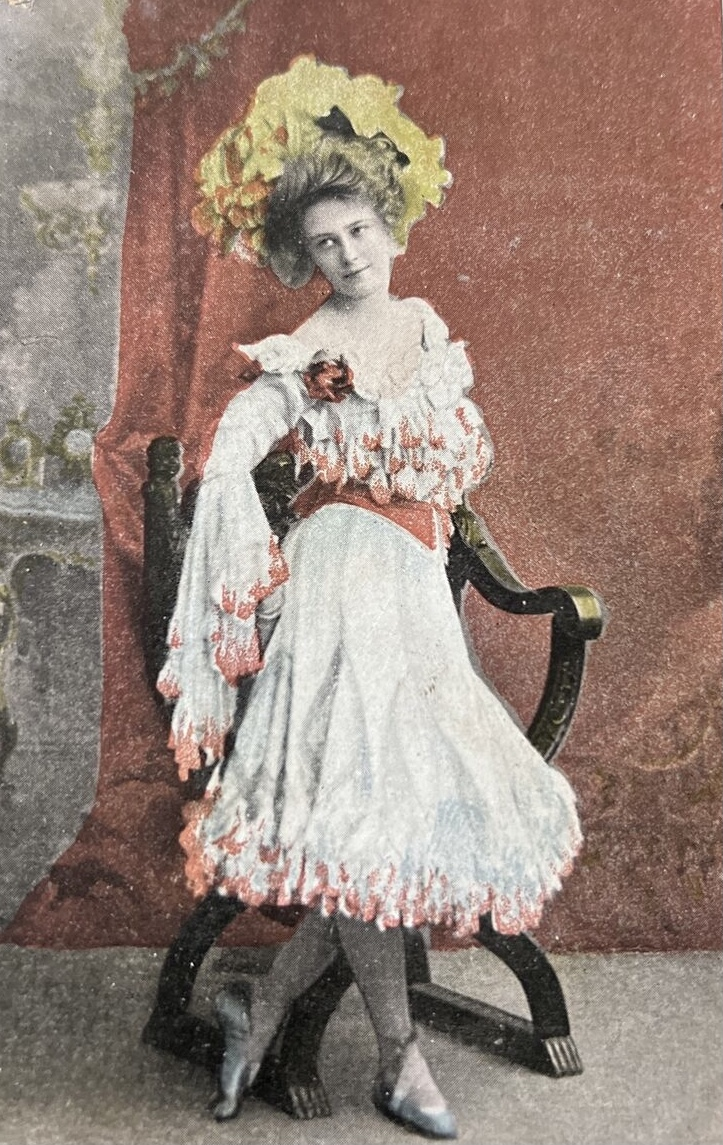
Pauline Chase c. 1906

She returned to London with Frohman in 1903 to appear in "The School Girls" at the Prince of Wales theatre and would remain in England for the next few years appearing in numerous productions and building upon her acting reputation. In December 1904 she was an original cast member (as the first twin) in the first ever production of J.M. Barrie's perennial favourite "Peter Pan" (with Nina Boucicault in the title role) at the Duke of York's Theatre. In 1905, whilst playing 'Columbine' in another Barrie play, "Pantaloon", she twice performed before the King and Queen in that role at Windsor and Sandringham and was singled out for special praise and the reward of a present from their Majesties.

In December 1905 she was again in the cast of "Peter Pan" opening at the Duke of Yorke's theatre in London and then going on provincial tour. When the new Pan, Cissie Loftus, was taken ill during the tour Pauline, as understudy, stepped into the lead role. Barrie was so impressed at her performance that she would continue to be his first choice for the role until she was no longer available due to her retirement from the stage. She played the part each Christmas at the Duke of York's theatre for the next eight years, over 1,400 performances. As a result she became synonymous with the role and it brought her considerable fame and fortune.

In the Autumn of 1906 she played the lead role in Chevalier's wordless play "The Scapegoat", and the following year was a big hit in "A Little Japanese Girl" at the Duke of York's. In 1908 she played in Paris, first in "Peter Pan" at the Vaudeville then at the Theatre des Arts in Pantaloon.

Chase spent much of her time off stage in Marlow, Buckinghamshire. She had her mother's body exhumed from her Washington grave and reburied at the Holy Trinity Church, in Marlow. Her connections with influential members of high society, assisted by Frohman, allowed her to lead an extravagant lifestyle. In Marlow, there is a statue of a naked lady atop a fountain, which was erected by the district council in 1924 in memory of Charles Frohman who had forged strong links with the town. Whilst there is no hard evidence to the fact, the model for the piece is widely believed to have been Pauline Chase.

She retired from the stage after the Christmas run of Peter Pan ended in 1913 to marry banker Captain Alexander Victor Drummond. They had three children. She came out of retirement in 1916 for her only screen appearance in The Real Thing at Last, a satirical film scripted by Barrie and shown at a benefit for the YMCA, attended by members of the British royal family. She was said to have had an affair with explorer Robert Falcon Scott before he was married.

She died in Royal Tunbridge Wells, England, in 1962.
