= Sir John Lowther, 2nd Baronet, of Whitehaven =

English politician and landowner

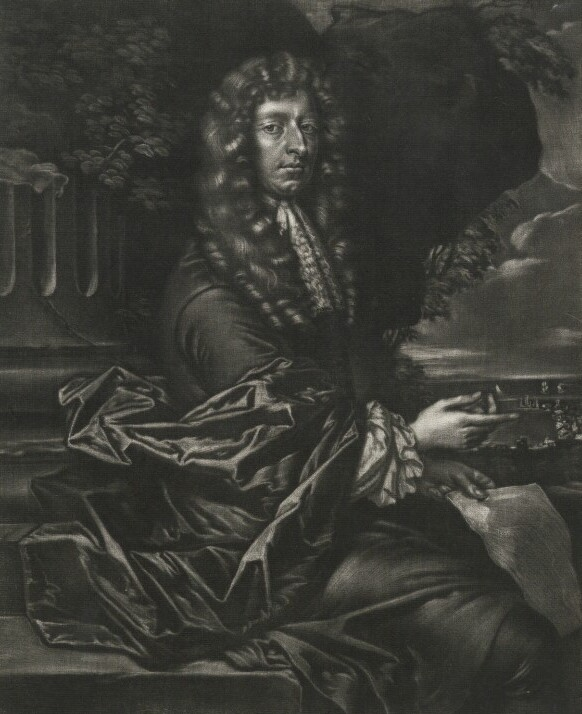
A 1684 mezzotint of Lowther

Sir John Lowther, 2nd Baronet FRS (9 November 1642 – 17 January 1706) was an English politician and landowner. Lowther was born at Whitehaven, in the parish of St Bees, Cumberland, the son of Sir Christopher Lowther, 1st Baronet, and his wife, Frances Lancaster, daughter of Christopher Lancaster of Stockbridge, Westmoreland. He was educated at Ilkley, Yorkshire and Balliol College, Oxford (matriculated 1657). He served as Member of Parliament for Cumberland from 1665 to 1701, and as a Lord Commissioner of the Admiralty from 1689 to 1696.

== Development of Whitehaven ==
Lowther owned large coal estates near Whitehaven, and worked to develop the mines and the port. He spent over £11,000 in expanding Lowther holdings in the Whitehaven area, concentrating on the acquisition of coal-bearing land, of land which would allow his pits unhampered access to Whitehaven harbour, and land which would hinder the working of others' pits. This, in turn, allowed him to improve the drainage of his pits, unworried by the thought that he was also draining his neighbours'.

He secured the grant of the right to hold a market and a fair to Whitehaven, and its recognition as a separate customs 'member-port' (under the 'head-port' of Carlisle) responsible for the Solway coast from Ravenglass to Ellenfoot (later Maryport). He also secured (against a rival grant to the Earl of Carlingford), recognition of his title to the foreshore (land between low-water and high-water) of the manor of St. Bees, containing 'houses lands staythes & salt pans at Whitehaven' valued at £400 a year.

He oversaw the rise of Whitehaven from a small fishing village (at his birth it consisted of some fifty houses and a population of about 250) to a planned town three times the size of Carlisle. At his death the 'port of Whitehaven' had 77 registered vessels, totaling about four thousand tons, and was exporting over 35,000 tons of coal a year.

== Family ==
Lowther had married Jane Leigh, a ward of his uncle Sir John Lowther of Lowther (because a daughter (by her first marriage to Woolley Leigh of Addington, Surrey) of Elizabeth Lowther (née Hare) who had taken as her second husband Sir John Lowther of Lowther). Lowther and Jane had three children:

- Sir Christopher Lowther, 3rd Baronet (1666–1731)
- Jane Lowther (1667 – 27 February 1730), unmarried
- Sir James Lowther, 4th Baronet (1673–1755)

His elder son, Christopher, had a drink problem, and – when drunk – other problems: "when sober he is sometimes passable enough, but not without discovering by fits notions very extravagant. When drunk no man in Bedlam more wild or more dangerous. The reflections he pretends to make afterwards, but if either dice or strong drink come in his way, he never yet resisted the temptation." complained Lowther, who disinherited him with an allowance of £2 a week.

Lowther died at Whitehaven and was buried at St Bees. He left the family estates (under entail) to his younger son, James, who although noted in 1688 to have 'contracted a great liking for strong drink than is usual in those of his age' (13) was by 1701 declaring himself (to his father) to be a water-drinker for the sake of his health.

Parliament of England
Preceded by Sir Patricius Curwen, Bt; Sir George Fletcher, 2nd Baronet	Member of Parliament for Cumberland; 1665–1701; With: Sir George Fletcher, Bt 1665–1679, 1681–1685, 1689–1701; Richard Lamplugh 1679; Viscount Morpeth 1679–1681; The Viscount Preston 1685–1689	Succeeded by Richard Musgrave; Gilfrid Lawson
Baronetage of England
Preceded by Christopher Lowther	Baronet (of Whitehaven); 1644–1706	Succeeded by Christopher Lowther
