= Sir Charles Lowther, 4th Baronet =

British noble (1880–1949)

Lieutenant-Colonel Sir Charles Bingham Lowther, 4th Baronet CB DSO DL (22 July 1880 – 22 January 1949), was a British Army officer in the 19th and 20th centuries. He was a prominent figure in Northamptonshire.

== Biography ==
Charles Lowther was the grandson of Sir Charles Lowther, 3rd Baronet, of Swillington and succeeded to his baronetcy in 1894. He was educated at Sandhurst, and gazetted a second lieutenant in the 21st Lancers on 12 August 1899. He transferred to the 8th King's Royal Irish Hussars and was promoted to lieutenant on 13 February 1900, reaching the rank of captain before transferring into the Northamptonshire Yeomanry on 4 May 1911.

Sir Charles received a DSO in the 1917 New Year Honours and he was awarded the Croce di Guerra on 17 May 1919, and made an Officer of the Order of the Crown of Italy on 2 March 1923.

Lowther was Master of the Pytchley Hounds from 1914 to 1927. During this time, he sold the Swillington estate in 1920 and after living at Thornby House, Northamptonshire for some years he settled at Erbistock Hall, Denbighshire. He was also appointed the High Sheriff of Northamptonshire in 1926 and deputy lieutenant of Northamptonshire 29 July 1922. He retired from the Territorial Army as a lieutenant colonel on 3 August 1935.

On 19 June 1941, he was appointed an Officer of the Venerable Order of St John, and was made a Commander of the Order on 2 July 1947. Lowther was appointed a deputy lieutenant of Denbighshire in the same year, on 21 March 1947 and resigned his Northamptonshire commission on 3 April 1947. He was made a CB in the 1948 Birthday Honours and died early in the following year.

Honorary titles
Preceded by John Allen	High Sheriff of Northamptonshire; 1926	Succeeded by George Henry Drummond
Baronetage of the United Kingdom
Preceded by Charles Lowther	Baronet (of Swillington); 1894–1949	Succeeded by William Lowther
