= Alexander Drummond (cricketer) =

English cricketer

Personal information
- Full name: Alexander Victor Drummond
- Born: 20 October 1888; Westminster, London, England
- Died: 29 April 1937 (aged 48); Tunbridge Wells, Kent, England
- Batting: Right-handed
- Bowling: Occasional wicket-keeper
- Relatives: George Drummond (brother)

Domestic team information
- Years: Team
- 1921: Buckinghamshire
- 1911–1921: Marylebone Cricket Club

Career statistics
| Competition | First-class |
|---|---|
| Matches | 8 |
| Runs scored | 182 |
| Batting average | 13.00 |
| 100s/50s | –/– |
| Top score | 30 |
| Balls bowled | 192 |
| Wickets | 3 |
| Bowling average | 52.33 |
| 5 wickets in innings | – |
| 10 wickets in match | – |
| Best bowling | 2/44 |
| Catches/stumpings | 2/– |
- Source: Cricinfo, 11 May 2011

Captain Alexander Victor Drummond (20 October 1888 – 29 April 1937) was an English cricketer. Drummond's batting and bowling styles are unknown.

== Personal life ==
Born in Westminster, London, he was the son of George James Drummond and Elizabeth Cecile Sophia Norman. He was educated at Harrow School. He later married actress Pauline Chase on 24 October 1914. The couple had three children. Drummond worked full-time as a banker. He served in the First World War, reaching the rank of captain, before continuing with his banking career after the war. He died in Tunbridge Wells, Kent on 29 April 1937.

== Cricket career ==
Drummond made his first-class debut for the Marylebone Cricket Club against Oxford University in 1911. He made seven further first-class appearances for the MCC: five before World War I and two after, the last of which came against Oxford University in 1921. In this total of 8 first-class matches, he scored 182 runs at a batting average of 13.00, with a high score of 30. With the ball, he took 3 wickets at a bowling average of 52.33, with a best figure of 2/44. Drummond made a single appearance for Buckinghamshire in the 1921 Minor Counties Championship against Cambridgeshire.
