= Henry Lowther =

Henry Lowther may refer to:

- Henry Lowther, 3rd Viscount Lonsdale (1694–1751), English courtier and landowner
- Henry Lowther, 3rd Earl of Lonsdale (1818–1876), British nobleman and Conservative politician
- Henry Lowther (politician) (1790–1867), British Conservative politician
- Henry Lowther (diplomat) (1858–1939), British ambassador to Chile and Denmark
- Henry Lowther (musician) (born 1941), English jazz trumpeter
