= James Lowther, 7th Earl of Lonsdale =

British peer (1922–2006)

The Right Honourable The Earl of Lonsdale

Personal details
- Born: James Hugh William Lowther; 3 November 1922
- Died: 23 May 2006 (aged 83) Carlisle, North West England
- Spouses: Tuppina Cecily Bennet (m. 1945; div. 1954) Jennifer Lowther (m. 1954; div. 1962) Nancy Ruth Stephenson (m. 1963; div. 1975) Caroline Sheila Ley (m. 1975)
- Relations: Lancelot Edward Lowther (paternal grandfather); Sir George Farrar (maternal grandfather)
- Parent(s): Anthony Lowther, Viscount Lowther; Muriel Frances Farrar
- Education: Eton College
- Alma mater: Cambridge University; Oxford University

James Hugh William Lowther, 7th Earl of Lonsdale (3 November 1922 – 23 May 2006), was a British peer.

== Background and education ==
Lowther was the elder son of Anthony Lowther, Viscount Lowther, and Muriel Frances Farrar, daughter of Sir George Herbert Farrar of Chicheley Hall, 1st Baronet, a South African Randlord.

Lowther was educated at Eton. In October 1940, he went up to Cambridge University to read mechanical engineering. After three months, he withdrew. In 1941, he joined the Army.

== Public life ==
The Army sent Lowther to Oxford University, where he completed a degree in Electricity and Magnetism in just six months, and he was commissioned into the Royal Armoured Corps in September 1942. As a Regimental Technical Adjutant with the rank of Captain in the East Riding Yeomanry, he was responsible for the upkeep of fifty-two tanks, two hundred soft vehicles and fifty soldiers, and helped put the first tanks ashore on the Normandy beaches on D-Day. He was later wounded at Caen following the landings, but subsequently returned to the front.

After being demobilised in 1946 he managed a steel erection and sheeting company in Newcastle until his father died somewhat prematurely in 1949. He accepted the invitation of his grandfather, Lancelot Lowther, 6th Earl of Lonsdale, to take over the running of the family estates which he subsequently inherited four years later after his grandfather's death in 1953. By this time the Lowther Estates, which comprised some 90,000 acres (360 km^{2}) in Westmorland and Cumberland, were largely run down and burdened by debt, and the Inland Revenue was demanding the payment of death duties amounting to some £2 million. Much of the estate's property in Whitehaven, a town largely built by earlier generations of Lowthers, was disposed of as part of his rescue plan, as indeed was the sale of acres of timber on the estates, felled to raise ready cash, although in this case the Earl replanted half as many trees again. He also established a string of new businesses, Lowther Construction, Lowther Forestry Group, Lowther Park Farms and the Lowther Wildlife Park which helped restore the family's fortunes, but was however unable to find any alternative use for the ancestral pile at Lowther Castle, and he reluctantly decided in 1957 to remove the roof, buttress the walls and leave it as a romantic ruin. He also established the annual Lowther Horse Driving Trials and Country Fair which has attracted thousands of visitors to Cumbria each year, including amongst their number Prince Philip, a regular competitor at the former and the royal couple often stayed with Lonsdale and his family at Lowther in Askham Hall during the trials.

Thereafter regarded as the saviour of his family estates, he resisted inclusion in the Sunday Times Rich List on the grounds that he was virtually penniless. However, after many years prevarication, he was eventually forced to admit his wealth and appeared in the 2006 Rich list with an estimated net worth of £80 million and later admitted that he anticipated that his death would result in the payment of "somewhere between £3 million and £5 million to the Treasury because it's high time society had its chunk".

He briefly came to public prominence in 1962 when Manchester Corporation proposed turning Ullswater into a reservoir to serve the people of Manchester. Having made a speech against the proposal in the House of Lords, the Earl became a leading figure in the Ullswater Preservation Society which campaigned against the scheme and eventually forced the corporation to adopt a drastically revised scheme. He thereafter became passionately concerned with the issue of the conservation of the Lake District and an opponent of the modern notion of building wind turbines. When one of his sons struck a deal to place wind turbines on part of the estates that he controlled, the Earl opposed the construction at the subsequent public inquiry.

Lonsdale was a founder director of Border Television, and was chairman of that company from 1985 to 1990. He also served as a chairman of the Northern Sports Council and a member of the UK Sports Council, spent six years on the Northern Economic Planning Council and was a member of the English Tourist Board. In addition he was president of Grasmere Sports, the Patterdale Dog Day, and the Cumberland and Westmorland Playing Fields Association, and served on a number of bodies such as the Hill Farming Advisory Committee, Westmorland Agricultural Committee, Northern Arts and the Rosehill Theatre at Whitehaven.

He eventually retired as head of the Lowther estate in 1993, having reached the age of seventy, and handed the business over to his second son. In later life he developed an interest in horse racing and was a part-owner of Motivator, the 2005 Derby winner.

== Personal life ==
Lonsdale was married four times. Firstly, he married Tuppina Cecily Bennet (died 1984) on 18 June 1945. Before their divorce in 1954, they had a daughter and a son:

- Lady Jane Helen Harbord Lowther (born 13 November 1947)
- Hugh Clayton Lowther, 8th Earl of Lonsdale (27 May 1949 – 22 June 2021)

On 9 September 1954, Lonsdale married his third cousin Jennifer Lowther, daughter of Christopher Lowther, and granddaughter of James Lowther, 1st Viscount Ullswater. Before their divorce in 1962, they were the parents of a son and two daughters:

- Lady Miranda Lowther (born 1 July 1955)
- William James Lowther, 9th Earl of Lonsdale (born 9 July 1957)
- Lady Caroline Lowther (born 11 March 1959), married firstly Guy Peter Thomas Forrester, secondly Stephen Christopher Ernest Hunt and thirdly Sir Charles John Patrick Lawson, 4th Baronet on 18 September 1987.

On 6 March 1963 Lonsdale married Nancy Ruth Stephenson (née Cobbs), originally of Camarillo and Pacific Palisades, California. Before their 1975 divorce, they were the parents of another son:

- Hon. James Nicholas Lowther (born 4 December 1964), father of fashion model Matilda Lowther.

On 4 December 1975 Lonsdale married his fourth and final wife, Caroline Sheila Ley (1943–2019), a daughter of Sir Gerald Gordon Ley, Bt, with whom he had a further son and daughter:

- Lady Marie-Louisa Kate Lowther (born 1976)
- Hon. Charles Alexander James Lowther (born 1978)

Lord Lonsdale died at the Cumberland Infirmary in Carlisle on 23 May 2006 at age 83. His eldest son Hugh Clayton Lowther succeeded to the earldom and other titles. His widow died on 8 February 2019.

=== Estate battle ===
Just four days before the Earl died in 2006, "a new company called Lonsdale Settled Estates was set up to administer the family land and buildings, with trustees, including the current Lord Lonsdale's half-brother Charles Lowther and a distant cousin, Viscount Ullswater" (a former equerry to Princess Margaret) that his eldest son claims, disinherited him "in all but name."

Peerage of the United Kingdom
Preceded by Lancelot Lowther	Earl of Lonsdale; 1953–2006	Succeeded by Hugh Clayton Lowther
