= Sir Christopher Lowther, 3rd Baronet =

English baronet

Sir Christopher Lowther, 3rd Baronet (1666 – 2 October 1731) was an English baronet, the eldest son of Sir John Lowther, 2nd Baronet and Jane Leigh (died 1678). His alcoholism and irresponsibility caused his father to disinherit him in 1701, leaving his brother James to become master of the Lowther estates at Whitehaven.

== Early life ==
Lowther was born at Sockbridge Hall (his paternal grandmother had been the last of the Lancasters of Sockbridge) and baptised on 4 June 1666. Correspondence suggests he may have been lame. He entered Queen's College, Oxford in 1685, but left after a year, having fallen in with a rakish set there, and taken to drinking and gambling. In 1688, he took up legal studies at the Inns of Court in 1688; his behavior having improved somewhat, his father canvassed (with Sir John Lowther of Lowther, whose pocket borough it was) the idea of Christopher becoming MP for Appleby.

== Estrangement from father ==
However, father and son quarreled in 1691, and were not reconciled for seven years. Christopher spent the next several years with the Rev. H. Maurice, who tried repeatedly to persuade him to cease heavy drinking and resume his legal studies. On several occasions Christopher wrote to his father reporting periods for which he had forgone liquor, and seeking reconciliation, but without success. He was discouraged when – a seat falling vacant at Carlisle – his father secured the return (November 1694) of his brother James as Member of Parliament, telling Sir John Lowther of Lowther that Christopher needed to be kept away from the distraction of London. Six months after James's election, Christopher wrote to Lady Lowther (the wife of Sir John of Lowther) telling her he had abstained from drink and gambling for five months and asking her to intercede for him with his father. The further return of James as MP for Carlisle at the general election of 1695 aroused great jealousy in him, and he began drinking again. In 1696, Sir John was contemplating sending Christopher to Whitehaven, with a moderate allowance, but was advised against it by William Gilpin, the steward of his Whitehaven estates, who pointed out that this would remove Christopher from most possibilities of innocent diversion, but not from temptation (the sons of the local gentry included notorious wastrels and drunkards), that to put Christopher at Whitehaven would give him the opportunity to supplement his income by the promise of future favours to those doing business with the Lowthers and to blast his reputation in the very place it would do most harm.

== Reconciliation and final break ==
In 1698, Lowther was reconciled with his father. His father was now living at Whitehaven, and James in London, so the former objection of the potential for James to be debauched by Christopher if they lived under the same roof no longer applied. Christopher was brought to Whitehaven in late 1699 and set to work learning and taking a part in the management of the family estates there (letters from him regarding the operation of the coal mines survive.) Sir John (who had discussed with his namesake of Lowther (now Viscount Lonsdale)) disinheriting Christopher decided to allow Christopher "my whole lifetime to re-instate himself". The possibility of Christopher becoming a Justice of the Peace was considered as was securing government employment for him in the Customs. However, on 5 July 1700, he precipitately left Whitehaven without his father's permission and returned to London. Three months later, he was imprisoned by his creditors in London, and was not released until 1702, when William Lancaster, the future provost of Queen's College, Oxford, paid his debts. This final episode served to exhaust the patience of his father, Sir John. When he fell ill in February 1701, he made out a will leaving the Lowther estates to James, in lieu of Christopher. Sir John died in January 1706, leaving the bulk of his fortune to James, and an allowance of £2 a week for Christopher.

== Later life ==
By this time, Christopher was in Newgate Prison owing a gambling debt of £54. James obtained his release in June 1706 by paying the debt. In return for his residual rights on the Lowther estates, James settled on him an annuity which, with the allowance already made by the will, gave Christopher about £200 a year.

In 1710, he married Jane Nanson, daughter of Philip Nanson, rector of Newnham, Hampshire (a living in the gift of Queen's College Oxford) He spent the remainder of his life living with his father-in-law or in his house on Brook Street, Holborn, where he died in 1731. Christopher Lowther seems to have married again (prior to 1725) a Hannah Taylor (buried St. James's, Clerkenwell, London, 1752) but left no children by either marriage : upon his death the baronetcy passed to his younger brother.

Baronetage of England
Preceded by John Lowther	Baronet (of Whitehaven); 1706–1731	Succeeded by James Lowther
