= Hugh Lowther, 8th Earl of Lonsdale =

British peer (1949–2021)

Arms of the Earl of Lonsdale

Hugh Clayton Lowther, 8th Earl of Lonsdale (27 May 1949 – 22 June 2021) was the eldest son of James Lowther, 7th Earl of Lonsdale, and the only son by his first wife Tuppina Cecily Bennet.

== Life ==
Lowther was born on 27 May 1949, the oldest son of James Lowther, later 7th Earl of Lonsdale, and his first wife, Tuppina (née Bennet), and was educated at Cheam preparatory school. On the death of the 6th Earl of Lonsdale in 1953, James Lowther succeeded to the earldom and Hugh Lowther became Viscount Lowther. He inherited 5,000 acres (20 km^{2}) of land in the Lake District, including the 868-metre high mountain, Blencathra. The land estate produced little income and Lowther turned to long-distance lorry driving as a career. He inherited the earldom on the death of his father in 2006.

He fell out with his father and his family during the 2000s over the family estate and again after the death of his father, a matter which not resolved until 2009. In May 2014, in order to pay an inheritance tax bill, he placed Blencathra, a mountain in the Lake District, and the title "Lord of the manor of Threlkeld" for sale. Ultimately, Lowther found other means to pay the bill and withdrew the mountain from sale.

== Marriages ==
Lonsdale was married three times, first to Pamela Colleen Middleton, on 2 October 1971; second in 1986 to Angela Mary Wyatt, and finally to Elizabeth Nee Arnison in 1999. With his first wife, whom he divorced after 12 years of marriage in circa 1983/1984, he had one adopted son Oliver, born by artificial insemination, who thus does not stand in succession to his father's titles.

== Death ==
Lord Lonsdale died on 22 June 2021, at the age of 72. As he had no sons capable of inheriting his titles, the earldom passed to his half-brother Hon. William James Lowther (born 9 July 1957) who is the son of the 7th Earl by his second wife.

Peerage of the United Kingdom
Preceded by James Lowther	Earl of Lonsdale; 2006–2021	Succeeded by William James Lowther
