= William Lowther (1668–1694) =

English Member of Parliament

William Lowther (17 June 1668 – 28 July 1694) was an English member of parliament, the posthumous son of John Lowther and his second wife, Mary Withins.

Parliament of England
Preceded by Jeremiah Bubb; Christopher Musgrave	member of parliament for Carlisle; 1692–1694; With: Christopher Musgrave	Succeeded by Christopher Musgrave; James Lowther
