= Sir James Lowther, 4th Baronet =

English landowner, industrialist and Whig politician

Sir James Lowther, 4th Baronet, FRS (1673 – 2 January 1755) was an English landowner, industrialist and Whig politician who sat in the House of Commons for 54 years between 1694 and 1755. His ownership and development of coal mines around Whitehaven in Cumberland gave him substantial revenues, and he was reputed the richest commoner in England.

== Early life ==
Lowther was baptised on 5 August 1673 at St Giles in the Fields, London, the second son of Sir John Lowther, 2nd Baronet and Jane Leigh. Educated privately in London, he attended Queen's College, Oxford and the Middle Temple. On the death of his father in 1706, the baronetcy was inherited by James's elder brother Christopher, but Christopher (whose drinking and gambling had led his father to disinherit him) was cut off with an annuity of about £100 a year and the family properties passed to James, who subsequently inherited the baronetcy in 1731, when his brother died without children.

== Politics ==
In 1694, Lowther was returned as Member of Parliament for Carlisle, a seat he held until 1702. He also served on the Board of Ordnance from 1696 until 1708, when he re-entered Parliament for Cumberland. This seat he held until 1722; in 1723, he was returned for Appleby, but in 1727 was MP for Cumberland again, and would be so for the rest of his life. His unopposed election in 1754 was noted to be "... the fifteenth Time he has been elected to represent us in Parliament, having sat threescore Years in the House of Commons, and being the only Member of the last Parliament, who sat in the Reign of King William." He was sworn a Privy Counsellor in 1714. Politically, Lowther was a Whig, but with little interest in national affairs; his Parliamentary activity was primarily directed towards promoting local interests in Cumbria.

== Source of wealth ==
The principal wealth of the estates was in coal mines, in West Cumberland (exporting about 35 thousand tons of coal a year and making a profit of about £1,000 a year when James inherited them). He used this income to extend and improve his holdings in the Cumberland coalfield, and to maintain his position as the dominant coal-owner there. Whitehaven produced most of the coal shipped from West Cumberland (which was largely sold into Ireland), and this made the Lowthers predominant in the coal field; the price of Whitehaven coals at Dublin being set by competition with other coal fields, not with other Cumberland ports such as Workington. Lowther's father had been worried that this predominance would be lost because of increased production elsewhere in the coal field (for example by the pits in the Workington area owned by the Curwen family) which Whitehaven would be unable to match because workable coal would soon be exhausted, and because of the limited capacity of Whitehaven harbour. On Tyneside, the leading coal-owners protected their profits by a price-setting cartel (the 'Grand Alliance'); Lowther instead adopted other strategies to maintain his dominance.

Sir John Clerk of Penicuik described him in 1739 as "an indolent old man, and knows nothing about coal works but in order to grow rich carried them on by the best advice and seems indeed to be very well served" but the context of the remark is that Clerk was planning (and gathering material for) a learned dissertation on coal-mining (Note: "I being a coal-master, of nearly forty years' experience, our Philosophical Society expects a dissertation from me on coals, with the best method of carrying up levels, setting down sinks, conveying air, rectifying damps and bad air, with such other things as are commonly observed about coal; this I am preparing..." Letter from Sir John Clerk to Mr Gale, dated from Edinburgh, 8th Dec. 1739) Lowther's principal residence was in London, and the success of his efforts did depend largely on his choice of able subordinates, most notably the Spedding brothers (John and Carlisle), but he kept up an extensive and detailed correspondence with them and travelled to Whitehaven (where Clerk of Penicuik met him in August 1739) most summers. Under Lowther, the pits at Whitehaven more than trebled their annual output of coal; their profits increased more than sixfold. (Note: The tonnage quoted there is "shipping tons" a measure of volume reckoned by Lowther in 1735 to be about 0.85t weight; the reported volume of exports in 1750 comes from customs records (there was a significant duty payable on the export of coal to Ireland) and is therefore almost certainly a considerable underestimate; in 1745 the local customs officers (the 'landwaiters') were reportedly charging ships' masters a shilling a voyage to turn a blind eye to under-declaration of their ship's cargo.)

=== The Spedding brothers ===
John Spedding (1685–1758) was first employed by Lowther's father, apparently to assist with the accounts. In his will Sir John bequeathed two years' salary (£20) to Spedding, and commended him to James. Spedding's adverse reports on the accounts of the colliery manager (John Gale, relative of the Speddings) led to Gale's dismissal (1707) and the discovery of embezzlement by him. John became colliery manager in his stead. It had been intended that John's younger brother, Carlisle Spedding, should go to sea with one of Gale's sons, but this now fell through, and Carlisle was instead employed as a subordinate to his brother. (It is said that Carlisle was sent to Tyneside to work as a hewer (under an assumed name) to see how things were done there, his true identity only being revealed by his getting expensive medical treatment after being hurt in an explosion. However the story first appeared in print a generation after Carlisle Spedding's death, and one modern writer doubts it, finding no evidence for it in the Lowther accounts, and seeing no reason for subterfuge since Tyneside and Cumberland sold their coal into different markets.) John was promoted to steward (in conjunction with Richard Gilpin 1722-30: on his own after 1730); he also entered into business on his own account, backed by Lowther's money and uncertainty as to when he was acting for himself, and when to further some scheme of his employer's was helpful to both parties. Carlisle's innovations in the Lowther mines at Whitehaven earned him a national reputation as a mining engineer; he succeeded his brother as colliery manager in 1730.

== Acquisitions in West Cumberland ==
Between 1709 and 1754, over £46,000 was spent to extend Lowther holdings of land and coal royalties in West Cumberland. (Note: Total is given by Wood; purchases (and price paid) are listed in appendices of) The intention was to destroy his local competitors and establish a local monopoly; he failed to offer others high enough purchase prices to secure the properties needed for a monopoly, but by the 1740s Lowther was the dominant exporter at every harbour in the coalfield. Loans were made to local landowners in the hope that interest payments would not be met and Lowther would be able to foreclose on the property. Mine-owners at Moresby and Distington were bought out. Repeated attempts were made (through John Spedding and other third parties) to lease the pits at Workington owned by the Curwen family, but came to nothing. However, a lease (in conjunction with a junior partner) was secured (1731) of Seaton colliery, which Spedding regarded as the greatest obstacle to Lowther domination of the coalfield, and in 1734, the lessees of Clifton colliery agreed to limit their export sales to 7000 tons a year, to be sold to the lessees of Seaton colliery; an agreement which – Spedding assured Lowther – must put the coal trade through Workington harbour entirely in his hands. The junior partner in the Seaton lease later fell out with Lowther and Spedding, and alleged that Seaton was deliberately being run inefficiently to stifle competition with the Whitehaven pits. A lease of the coal royalties owned by St Bees School (of which both Sir James and John Spedding were governors) was obtained (1742) on manifestly unfair terms. (Note: an annual rent of £3.50, with no additional payment per ton raised, for a period of 867 years: the terms of the lease were queried by the Charity Commissioners in 1819 and the lease quashed (after the conflict of interest of Lowther and Spedding emerged) in 1827, with back-royalties of over £13,000 having to be paid)

== Improvements ==
=== Draining mines by steam-driven pumps ===
The Lowther coal mines at Whitehaven inherited by James were on the eastern edge of high ground to the west of the town (what was later known as the Howgill colliery) and worked seams which dipped westward at a gradient of about 10%. The distance to which the seams could be followed using gravity drainage by adits was therefore considerable, but limited. (Note: "The Whitehaven Coal Field is divided into two distinct and separate portions. One embraces the vast tract laying between the St. Bees' valley and the sea, and under the sea, and the other lays to the north-east of the same valley. The former is called Howgill Colliery, and the latter Whingill Colliery. It may be safely asserted that the whole of the tract of ground, containing an area of eight or ten square miles, laying between St. Bees valley and the sea, is or has been full of coal. The Six-Quarters Seam lays under the whole of it, as do also the Main and Bannock Seams, except along a narrow strip on the west of Pow Beck, beyond their out-crop. The Main Seam crops out to the surface nearly on the line of the low road to St. Bees, and has been worked at a very early period along the line of out-crop from Whitehaven to St. Bees, as far as Partis Pit, near Stanley Pond, on the Furness railway, a distance of two-and-a-half miles. The Bannock Seam crops out at a correspondingly higher level, and another seam, twenty fathoms above it, still higher, on the eastern face of the hill, whilst on the coast-line the Main Seam is found at depths varying from about eighty fathoms at Saltom, to 240 at the recent bore-hole near the sea at St. Bees. Bearing these facts in mind and remembering that the tract in question,—called Preston Isle,—rises to a height of upwards of 400 feet above the level of the sea, whilst the valley nowhere exceeds fifty feet, it is obvious that large tracts of coal can be readily and easily drained by gravitation,—a matter of great importance at all times, but of absolute necessity in almost all instances before the invention of the steam engine.")To continue mining without the pits flooding, Sir John had had to use horse-powered gins to raise water mechanically, but this was expensive (and increasingly so as the seams were followed deeper): Sir John, and after him James, had concerns that there were little more reserves of economically retrievable coal. In 1712 John Spedding urged Lowther to consider the adoption of pumping by steam, by "Captain Savory's invention", but nothing seems to have come of this until in 1715 Lowther discussed the problem of recovering a flooded pit with Thomas Newcomen. Newcomen submitted proposals in October 1715, which Spedding found clear and businesslike; from them he concluded that a Newcomen engine would recover the pit in two-thirds the time that horse gins would take, and would do so at a quarter of the cost. A contract was signed (November 1715) for a small (17-inch diameter cylinder) Newcomen engine to be erected and leased from the consortium holding Savery's patent for £182 a year. Despite numerous teething problems, (Note: principally rapid boiler corrosion (the boiler was made of both iron and copper, and was originally fed with the water pumped from the mine), steam leaks from flanges, and leakage of pumped water from the wooden pipes originally used. More generally "it is worth knowing that only a few years ago an attempt to build a one-third-scale replica Newcomen engine ran into a great deal of difficulty. Even with good plans, even with plenty of technical expertise, even with a knowledge of what the end product was supposed to be and an absolute certainty that it could be made to work, it turned out that it took many months of tinkering and fiddling to get the engine to run properly". The licensees provided a commissioning engineer, but Carlisle Spedding was – so his brother asserted – the only other person who understood the engine; certainly the patent-holders tried to poach him as a commissioning engineer for engines being built elsewhere.) the engine (and the pumps it operated) proved a success and in February 1727 after ten years operation Lowther bought the engine (and the right to operate it) outright for £200 and paid another £350 for a license to build and operate another (slightly larger) one. About this time, Lowther commented to John Spedding "We have been very successful from first to last in the timing of things about the Fire Engine, which I should hardly have ventured upon if I had not mett with such a very honest good man as Mr. Newcomen who I believe would not wrong anybody to gain ever so much". Horses were still used to haul coal, and for winding of coal and men.

=== Working coal under the sea – Saltom pit ===
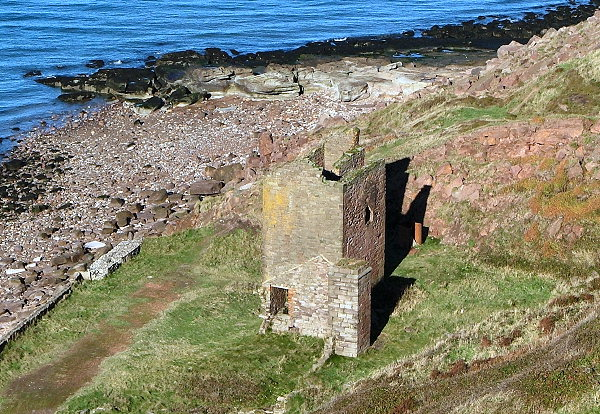
Saltom pit

Lowther then exploited the greater ease with which water ingress could be coped with by sinking a pit at the western edge of the Howgill colliery, close to the sea shore at Saltom. Work began early in 1730, (Note: New Style; but (since this is before 1752) Lady Day Quarter of 1729 according to John Spedding's accounts.) and the pit was officially opened in May 1732 with great celebration (an ox-roast in the street; a public dinner for the Justices of the Peace and the principal inhabitants (with many toasts...)). The Newcastle Courant thought the celebrations fully justified; because of the scale of the undertaking ('the Attempt being generous and great': a shaft twelve foot by ten had been sunk seventy-seven fathoms (the deepest a pit had been sunk in any part of Europe) to a three-yard thick coal seam (the Main Band) in twenty-three months, using thirty barrels of gunpowder, and without any loss of life or limb by the workforce); because of the difficulties overcome (which "would have discourag'd all common Undertakers" (a "blower" of firedamp had been encountered at forty-two fathoms) but had been overcome by the 'unparallel'd Conduct and Skill of Sir James Lowther's Managers, Messieurs John and Carlisle Spedding'); but above all 'The perfecting of this costly Undertaking renders a universal Joy to the Inhabitants...; because the consequence is such as makes certain a valuable Colliery for many Generations'.

Further improvements proved necessary; attempts to ship coal directly from Saltom were unsuccessful, and an underground roadway was driven to the bottom of another pit, from whose pithead a waggonway ran to Whitehaven harbour. The pumping engine originally installed at Saltom proved inadequate, and by 1739 two much larger ones were in use. But Saltom pit allowed the working of much coal inaccessible from previous pits; by 1765, workings extended a mile and a half from the shaft and as much as three-quarters of a mile out to sea. (Note: Lowther's mineral rights ended at the low water mark, like his other manorial rights but not until 1860 did the Crown assert its ownership of undersea coal, and begin to collect royalties) Clerk of Penicuik (who thought it folly to have assumed the ingress of sea water would be manageable) commented:

At Whitehaven I took notice that Sir Ja. Louder, by the meer force of money, was working a field of Coal under the sea, which neither he nor any man else had ever attempted but from ignorance and a vast store of Richess.

Lowther had spent on a scale beyond other Cumbrian coal-owners (and beyond most other coal-owners elsewhere in Britain) – £1900 had been invested before any significant amount of coal was raised, and it took over £4,500 to get the pit into full production. (Note: Beckett says £1800 before any coal raised, but Ward notes that accounts show some coal being hauled up the shaft in Lady Day Quarter 1730 (i.e. early 1731 New Style) before the shaft hit the blower) But the expenditure was rewarded: by 1752 over a quarter of a million tons had been extracted and sold at a profit of over a shilling a ton; Saltom pit continued to be worked until 1848.

=== Dealing with firedamp ===
The blower encountered in sinking Saltom pit was described to the Royal Society by Lowther, who sought suggestions on how to deal with firedamp in his pits. A major release had taken place on breaking through a layer of black stone into one of the higher coal seams. Ignited with a candle, it had given a steady flame "about half a Yard in Diameter, and near two Yards high" The flame being extinguished, and a wider penetration through the black stone made, re-ignition of the gas gave a bigger flame, a yard in diameter and about three yards high which was only extinguished with difficulty. The blower was panelled off from the shaft, and piped to the surface where over two and a half years later it continued as fast as ever, filling a large bladder in a few seconds. The Society members elected Sir James a Fellow, but were unable to come up with any solution, or improve on the assertion (eventually found to be incorrect) of Carlisle Spedding, the paper's author, that "this sort of Vapour, or damp Air, will not take Fire except by Flame; Sparks do not affect it, and for that Reason it is frequent to use Flint and Steel in Places affected with this sort of Damp, which will give a glimmering Light, that is a great Help to the Workmen in difficult Cases."

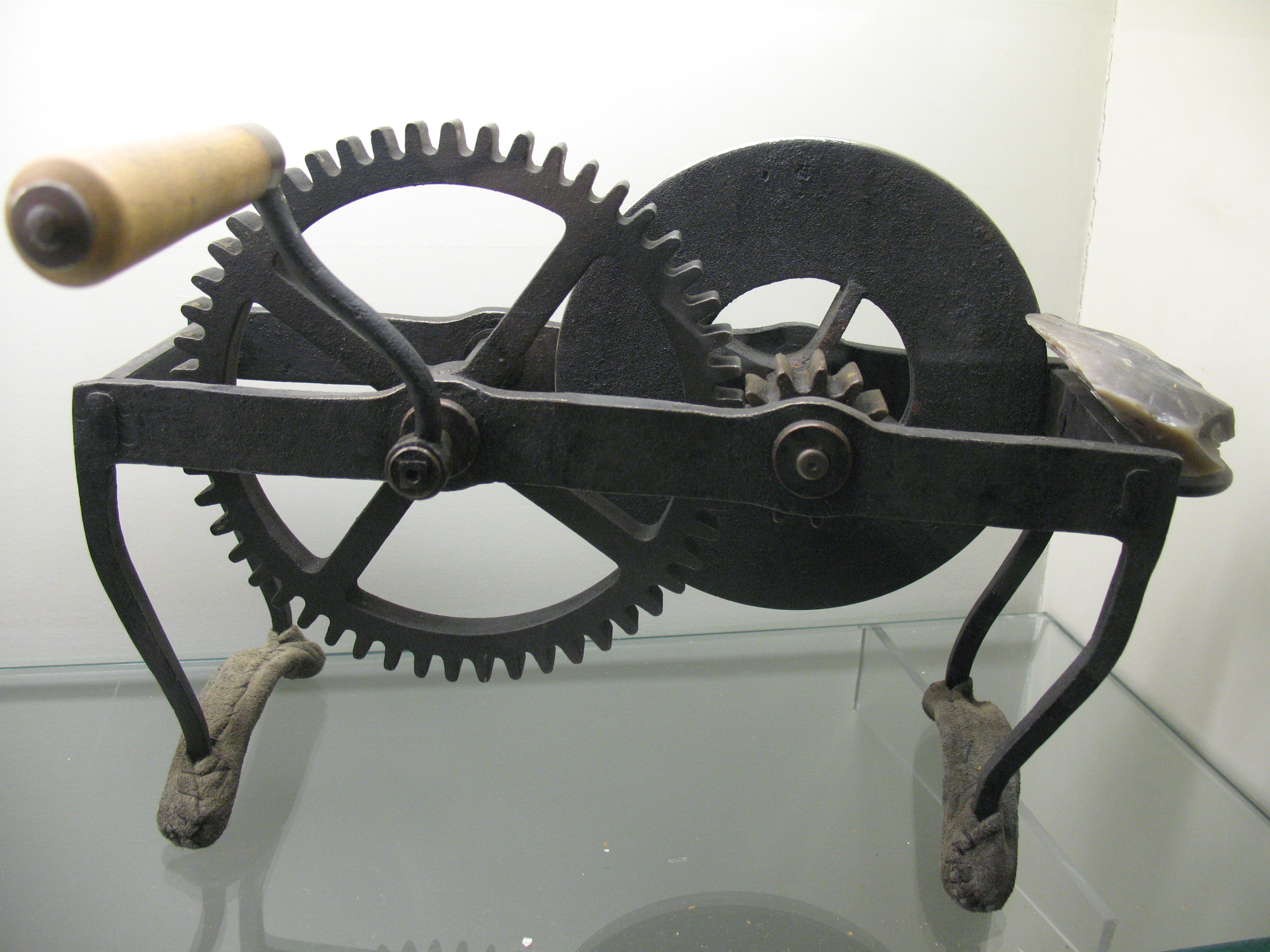
Spedding's "steel mill"

Spedding invented a "steel mill", in which a flint was held against a rapidly rotated steel disc, producing a stream of sparks giving some illumination. A second worker was needed to operate the mill, since the disc was rotated by a hand crank, and its operation was tiring. The use of the mill as a safer alternative to naked flame spread to other coalfields; prior to the introduction of the Davy lamp, up to a hundred steel mills were in daily use at one Tyneside colliery despite a fatal firedamp explosion at Wallsend colliery in 1785 ignited by a steel mill.

Spedding also introduced the practice of "coursing the air". As in other pits, the working areas were ventilated by fresh air, drawn down one half of a partitioned shaft; the air was then exhausted up the other half of the shaft, the air circulation being driven by a furnace at the base of the return half of the shaft: wooden partitioning and doors were used to prevent short-circuiting between feed and exhaust flows within the mine. Spedding improved this by ensuring that after ventilating areas currently being worked the exhaust stream was routed through previously worked areas to eliminate any possibility of firedamp accumulation in unventilated volumes. This practice also spread from the Lowther pits to become standard practice in other coalfields.

Lowther also supported experimental work on firedamp by William Brownrigg, a local doctor (and a son of the local gentry; in due course he married a Spedding daughter) and presented papers by Brownrigg at the Royal Society. (Note: Brownrigg's interest sprang originally from his belief that to practice medicine properly, a doctor should understand the way of life and living conditions of his patients; miners, he thought, were healthier than the general population except when exposed to the various damps they inhaled in the mines. Lowther's support was practical (Brownrigg's laboratory had a piped supply of firedamp from a nearby Lowther pit; the firedamp was used both as experimental material and as fuel to heat the laboratory furnaces), rather than financial (Lowther contributed towards the cost of Brownrigg's laboratory and, having met the incidental costs of Brownrigg being made FRS, subsequently recovered the twenty-two guineas from Brownrigg) Ward and Yell link this to Lowther's reputation for parsimony, but other considerations may have applied: Brownrigg was not a Lowther employee, and (like his predecessor in the practice – one of the Senhouses of Netherhall) from reasonably prosperous Cumberland landed gentry.) Brownrigg was elected an FRS, but his papers on the subject were held back by him from publication (he is said to have intended a History of Coal Mining), and have now been lost.

=== Harbours ===
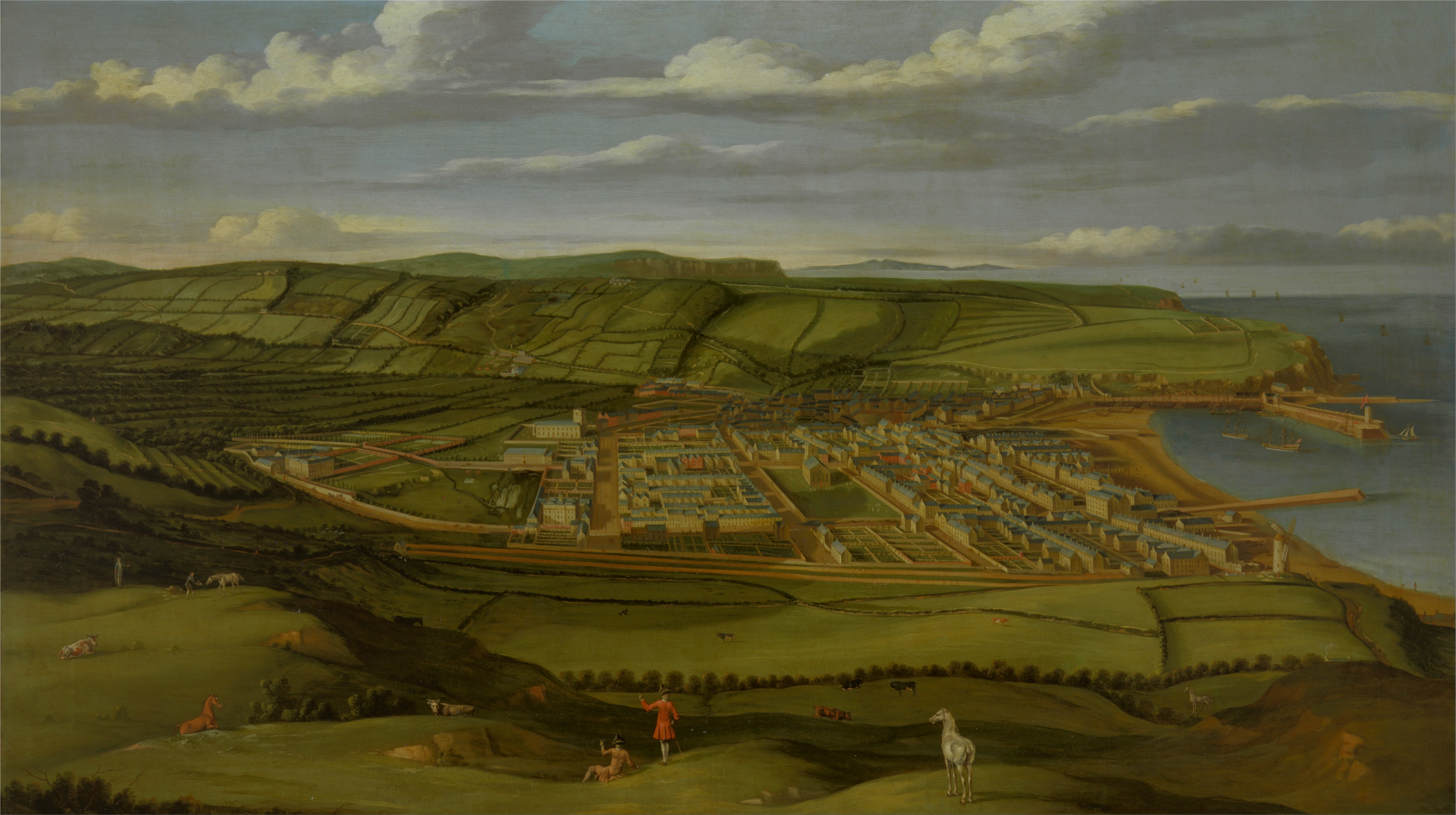
Whitehaven harbour and town c 1730 (Note: From the Yale Collection of British Art. The view is from the north, and shows the harbour before a series of major improvements in the 1730s, which may be the purpose for which it was commissioned by Sir James: another version, commissioned in 1736 and held at the Beacon, Whitehaven, shows a pier (the Old Tongue) built 1733-35)

Sir John had developed Whitehaven as a port for the export of his coal, and had opposed and obstructed the development of a rival harbour at Parton, little more than a mile to the north. James was used by his father to organise opposition in Parliament (1705-6) to a private bill brought in by Thomas Lamplugh, MP for Cockermouth, to allow repair of the facilities at Parton, but Sir John died as the bill came before committee; James was called away to bury his father and take over the estates, and Lamplugh got his act, the Parton Harbour Act 1705 (4 & 5 Ann. c. 5). This set up a committee of trustees to run the port, and gave them powers to build between the high and low water marks (over which Lowther otherwise would have had jurisdiction), and to levy tolls on coals loaded at the port. (Note: the terms on which Whitehaven had been made a customs port precluded any charge on ships using Parton, but not tolls on cargoes. The toll on coal was set at a rate of 4d a ton, dropping to ½d a ton after eleven years.)

In 1709, James obtained an act of Parliament, the Whitehaven Harbour Act 1708 (7 Ann. c. 9), to improve Whitehaven harbour, and collect tolls (on cargoes: for example 1/2d a ton (Note: In this context a ton of coal was a measure of volume said in 1695 to be 192 gallons for shipping (and hence toll) purposes. At the pit it was 264 gallons; at Dublin 320 (the Irish dry gallon was significantly smaller than the English, but the above figures use the same gallon – judging from the reported weight of a Dublin ton the English one – throughout). The Dublin ton weighed 21-22 hundredweight, the Whitehaven shipping ton was therefore reckoned to be 14 hundredweight in 1695. In 1735 (when customs duties were charged 'per chaldron' and therefore on a weight basis) it was reckoned to be 17 hundredweight, with the pithead ton then being about 21 hundredweight) Fletcher noted in 1878 that the old pit ton by measure contained thirty-six Winchester bushels (i.e. 288 gallons), "and I have ascertained, by careful measuring and weighing, that the pit ton weighs 21 cwt. 2 qrs. 11 lbs., but as these no doubt a little overweight obtained, we may assume that practically it was 22 cwt., and the Whitehaven railway waggon first used, soon after 1730, contained 44 cwt. (and continued of that size for a century afterwards)") of coal) and anchorage dues (on ships: 2d a ton (displacement) on ships arriving from a British or Irish port, 4d a ton on those arriving from Europe, and 8d a ton for those arriving from further afield) to pay for the improvements. The charges were to be reduced to a third after fourteen years, but a further act of Parliament, the Whitehaven Harbour Act 1711 (10 Ann. c. 17), deferred the reduction for another fourteen years, and authorised the borrowing of £1,350 (against future revenue) to complete the improvements. The harbour was to be run by a committee of twenty-one trustees. Seven of the trustees were to be nominated by Lowther and to hold the position at his pleasure; the other fourteen were to be elected by the traders using the port. The trustees were also entrusted with the cleansing, paving, and sewerage of the town of Whitehaven, and empowered to levy domestic rates to pay for this. During Lowther's lifetime, the harbour was deepened, and a new outer harbour built, considerably increasing the port capacity. Land transport to the harbour from the main Whitehaven pits was improved by the introduction of waggonways and the need for coal to be loaded into sacks at the pithead removed by a new staith at the harbour:

"In this staith are fixed five hurries or spouts, at such a distance from each other that a ship of three hundred tons burthen can be under each hurry and receive a loading at one time. The staith is about thirty-seven feet above the level of the quay, and when the waggons arrive there the bottom of each waggon is drawn out and the coals are dropped from there into the hurry or spout under it, through which they run down into the ship laid below to receive her loading".

The staith also contained storage for three thousand waggon loads (six thousand tons Dublin measure).

Parton had not proved a serious competitor to Whitehaven (it was more difficult to access, and the coal brought to it was of lower quality), but it had been used by Lowther to export coal from pits he had bought in Moresby and Distington. Lamplugh did not keep the pier in good repair, and in 1718 it collapsed in a storm, blocking access to the harbour. Not until 1724 (after Lamplugh had sold his local interests to John Brougham (Note: of Scales Hall: Commissioner Brougham was able to match Lowther's outlay (if only briefly), not from local resources, but from money made in a successful career in London. He had been a Commissioner of Excise (salary £1000 a year) 1715-1724, previously (1702-1715) Secretary to the Commissioners of Excise)) was any attempt made to re-open Parton. A fresh act of Parliament was obtained by Lowther setting up a new committee of trustees (including Lowther, both his stewards, and a number of relatives and adherents) authorised to borrow up to £2,000 to carry out repairs against future cargo tolls. Lowther and Brougham each lent half the money needed and Parton harbour was back in operation by the end of 1726. Lowther's continued acquisition of pits, manors and mineral rights in the area included the purchase (1737) of Brougham's interest in Parton harbour (for just over £2,000): henceforth Parton was also a Lowther harbour, but subordinate to Whitehaven.

== General ==
=== Wealth and frugal lifestyle ===
By the 1730s Lowther was reputed to be the richest commoner in England, enjoying an income of about £25,000 a year at his death. (Note: John Wesley repeatedly preached at Whitehaven (commenting on one occasion on the poverty of his auditors, who made those at Newcastle look prosperous; "surely here, above any place in England 'God has chosen the poor of the world'"). He once preached there against the love of riches, to which a person of note objected: "Why does he talk about riches here? There is no rich person at Whitehaven but Sir James L-----r" No date is given for the remark which, however applicable to the article subject, might have been applied to the first Earl of Lonsdale, who inherited the Whitehaven Lowther properties in 1756 when still only Sir James Lowther and was ennobled in 1784) He was a Governor of St Thomas' Hospital and a founding Governor of the Foundling Hospital, and the principal contributor to the construction and endowment of two new churches in Whitehaven. His own lifestyle was frugal, which earned him a reputation for parsimony and the soubriquet of "Farthing Jemmy", After his death, anecdotes appeared suggesting him to be both penny-wise:

Sir James Lowther, after changing a piece of silver in George's Coffee House, and paying twopence for his dish of coffee, was helped into his chariot (for he was then very old and infirm), and went home; some little time after he returned to the same coffee house on purpose to acquaint the woman who kept it that she had given him a bad halfpenny, and demanded another in exchange for it. Sir James had about forty thousand pounds per annum, and was at a loss whom to appoint his heir.

and pound-foolish:

We are informed, from Whitehaven, that Sir William Lowther, Bart. Gave all the Wearing Apparel of the late Sir James Lowther among Sir James' Servants; and that one of them having found several Papers pinned under the Sleeve of the coat which had fallen to his Share, took them to Sir William, and said, he apprehended they were not designed for him as any Part of the Present, and therefore he thought it his Duty to return them. Since when, Sir William has settled £50 a year on him for Life, as a Reward for his Honesty.- 'Tis said the Papers were Bank Notes worth £10,000.

There is no independent confirmation of either of these anecdotes.

=== Health ===
Like his father Lowther (a water drinker for his health's sake since at least 1701) suffered from gout, and from 1726 onwards he seems to have had a bad attack nearly every winter. In 1750, the attack was particularly severe and ensuing complications led to the amputation of his right leg. Lowther (just turned seventy-seven) survived the operation and (once the stump was healed, and wooden leg fitted) resumed his routine of spending nine months of the year in London (maintaining effective control of his mines by frequent correspondence with his steward) but the summer in Whitehaven. He died in London early in January 1755 and was buried in Whitehaven in Holy Trinity church, which he had been instrumental in founding in 1715.

=== Provisions of will ===
In the autumn of 1754, John Wesley followed up a meeting with Lowther by writing him a letter admonishing him to be more generous in personal alms-giving, and to leave his wealth to a better cause than the continued support of the Lowther family name. (Note: The Lowthers of Whitehaven were a cadet branch of an ancient family. James's great-grandfather was Sir John Lowther of Lowther; the first Lowther baronet but the thirtieth knight. Believing – as he exhorted his children – that: "Without ... wealth (the supporte and upholder of gentrie and worldlie reputation) nobilitie or gentilitie is a vaine and contemptible tytle hear in England, and allwayes hath bene and of the contrarie, the degree of wealth is the degree of gentrie." he had supported the trading activities of his second son Christopher and bought a half-share in the manor of St Bees (which included Whitehaven) as a suitable legacy to maintain the dignity of the family name. Thanks to this support, Christopher had gone on to marry a heiress, serve as High Sheriff if Cumberland, raise a regiment to serve in Ireland, and be made a baronet.)

The substance of what I took the liberty to mention to you this morning was: You are on the borders of the grave, as well as I; shortly we must both appear before God. (Note: At this time, Wesley's health was poor; he was settling his affairs and composing his epitaph, but in the event he lived to 1791) When it seemed to me, some months since, that my life was near an end, I was troubled that I had not dealt plainly with you. This you will permit me to do now, without any reserve, in the fear and in the presence of God.

I reverence you for your office as a magistrate; I believe you to be an honest, upright man; I love you for having protected an innocent people from their cruel and lawless oppressors. (Note: In 1749 seamen had attempted to break up an open air meeting of the Methodists (mostly colliers and family). This had led to a seamen vs colliers riot. The colliers worked in Lowther pits, and – unlike magistrates elsewhere – Lowther had not blamed anti-Methodist disturbances on the Methodists) But so much the more am I obliged to say (though I judge not; God is the judge), I fear you are covetous, that you love the world. And if you do, as sure as the Word of God is true, you are not in a state of salvation.

The substance of your answer was: That many people exhort others to charity from self-interest; that men of fortune must mind their fortune; that you cannot go about to look for poor people; that when you have seen them your-self, and relieved them, they were scarce ever satisfied; that many make an ill use of what you give them; that you cannot trust the account people give of themselves by letters; that nevertheless you do give to private persons by the hands of Colonel Hudson and others; that you have also given to several hospitals an hundred pounds at a time, but that you must support your family; that the Lowther family has continued above four hundred years; that you are for great things -- for public charities and for saving the nation from ruin; and that others may think as they please, but this is your way of thinking, and has been for many years...

Is not death at hand? And are not you and I just stepping into eternity? Are we not just going to appear in the presence of God, and that naked of all worldly goods ? Will you then rejoice in the money you have left behind you? or in that you have given to support a family, as it is called -- that is, in truth, to support the pride and vanity and luxury which you have yourself despised all your life long?

Despite Wesley's admonitions, Lowther divided his estates and property largely among other Lowther baronets (although a thousand pounds was left to John Spedding, and five hundred pounds to Carlisle Spedding).

The late Sir James Lowther has left the Bulk of his great Fortune, amounting to near £600,000 to the two Baronets of his name, distant relations. His Estate in Cumberland, with the Coal-Mines, which produce £15,000 per Annum (Note: Annual profits of the Whitehaven mines were about £7,000 a year; Lowther also had (less profitable) collieries at Parton, Dearham, Scalegill, and Seaton; rental income from his properties in Cumberland was about £3,300 a year) to Sir William Lowther [of Marske], Bart. His Estates in Westmoreland and Middlesex, (Note: rentals of £200 and £1,059 respectively in 1754.) with his Stocks, Mortgages, &c, to a great Value to Sir James Lowther [of Lowther].

Sir William died in 1756 and the properties he had inherited from Sir James Lowther of Whitehaven passed to Sir James Lowther of Lowther (Wicked Jimmy), with whom he is sometimes confused.

== Works ==
- Lowther, J. (1733). "An Account of the Damp Air in a Coal-Pit of Sir James Lowther, Bart. Sunk within 20 Yards of the Sea; Communicated by Him to the Royal Society". Philosophical Transactions. 38 (427–435): 109–113. Bibcode:1733RSPT...38..109L. doi:10.1098/rstl.1733.0019. JSTOR 103830. S2CID 186210832. was presented by Lowther but without any explicit claim to authorship: probably written by Carlisle Spedding.

== Notes ==
Parliament of England
Preceded by Christopher Musgrave; William Lowther	Member of Parliament for Carlisle; 1694–1702; With: Christopher Musgrave 1694–95; William Howard 1695–1701; Philip Howard 1701–02	Succeeded by Christopher Musgrave; Thomas Stanwix
Parliament of Great Britain
Preceded by Richard Musgrave; George Fletcher	Member of Parliament for Cumberland; 1708–1722; With: Gilfrid Lawson	Succeeded by Gilfrid Lawson; Sir Christopher Musgrave, Bt
Preceded by Sir Richard Sandford, Bt; Sackville Tufton	Member of Parliament for Appleby; 1723–1727; With: Sackville Tufton	Succeeded by Sackville Tufton; Sir John Ramsden
Preceded by Gilfrid Lawson; Sir Christopher Musgrave, Bt	Member of Parliament for Cumberland; 1727–1755; With: Gilfrid Lawson 1727–34; Sir Joseph Pennington, Bt 1734–44; Sir John Pennington, Bt 1745–55	Succeeded by Sir John Pennington, Bt; Sir William Lowther, Bt
Military offices
Preceded by Christopher Musgrave	Clerk of the Deliveries of the Ordnance; 1696–1701	Succeeded by John Pulteney
Preceded by William Meesters	Storekeeper of the Ordnance; 1701–1708	Succeeded by Robert Lowther
Honorary titles
Preceded by Sir William Pennington	Vice-Admiral of Cumberland; 1715–1755	Succeeded by The Earl of Egremont
Preceded by Sir William Pennington	Vice-Admiral of Westmorland; 1715–1755	Vacant Title next held by Sir James Lowther
Preceded by The Earl of Clarendon and Rochester	Senior Privy Counsellor; 1753–1755	Succeeded by Sir Paul Methuen
Baronetage of England
Preceded by Christopher Lowther	Baronet (of Whitehaven); 1731–1755	Extinct
