= John Lowther (died 1668) =

English landowner (c. 1628–1668)

Colonel Sir John Lowther (c. 1628 – March 1668) was an English landowner, at Hackthorpe, the eldest son and heir of Sir John Lowther, 1st Baronet and Mary Fletcher.

He first married, in 1665, Elizabeth Bellingham, daughter of Sir Henry Bellingham, 1st Baronet. They had two children:

- John Lowther, 1st Viscount Lonsdale (1655–1700)
- Mary Lowther, married her third cousin twice removed, John Lowther of Dantzic

By his second marriage to Mary Withins, he had one (posthumous) son:

- William Lowther (1668–1694)

He predeceased his father and did not succeed to the baronetcy.

Parliament of England
Preceded by Sir Henry Cholmley; Christopher Clapham	Member of Parliament for Appleby; 1661–1668; With: John Dalston	Succeeded by John Dalston; Thomas Tufton
