= Sir William Lowther, 3rd Baronet =

English landowner

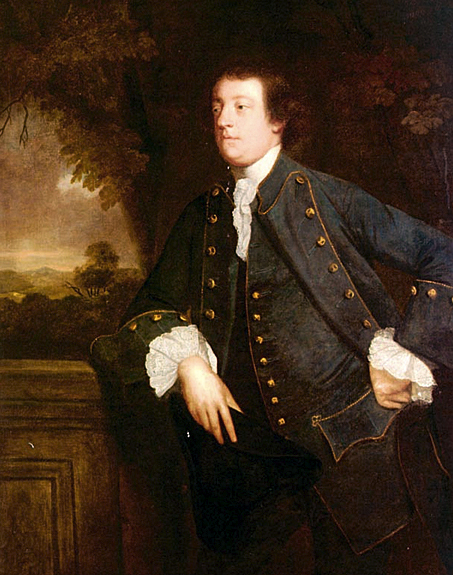
Sir William Lowther, 3rd Baronet

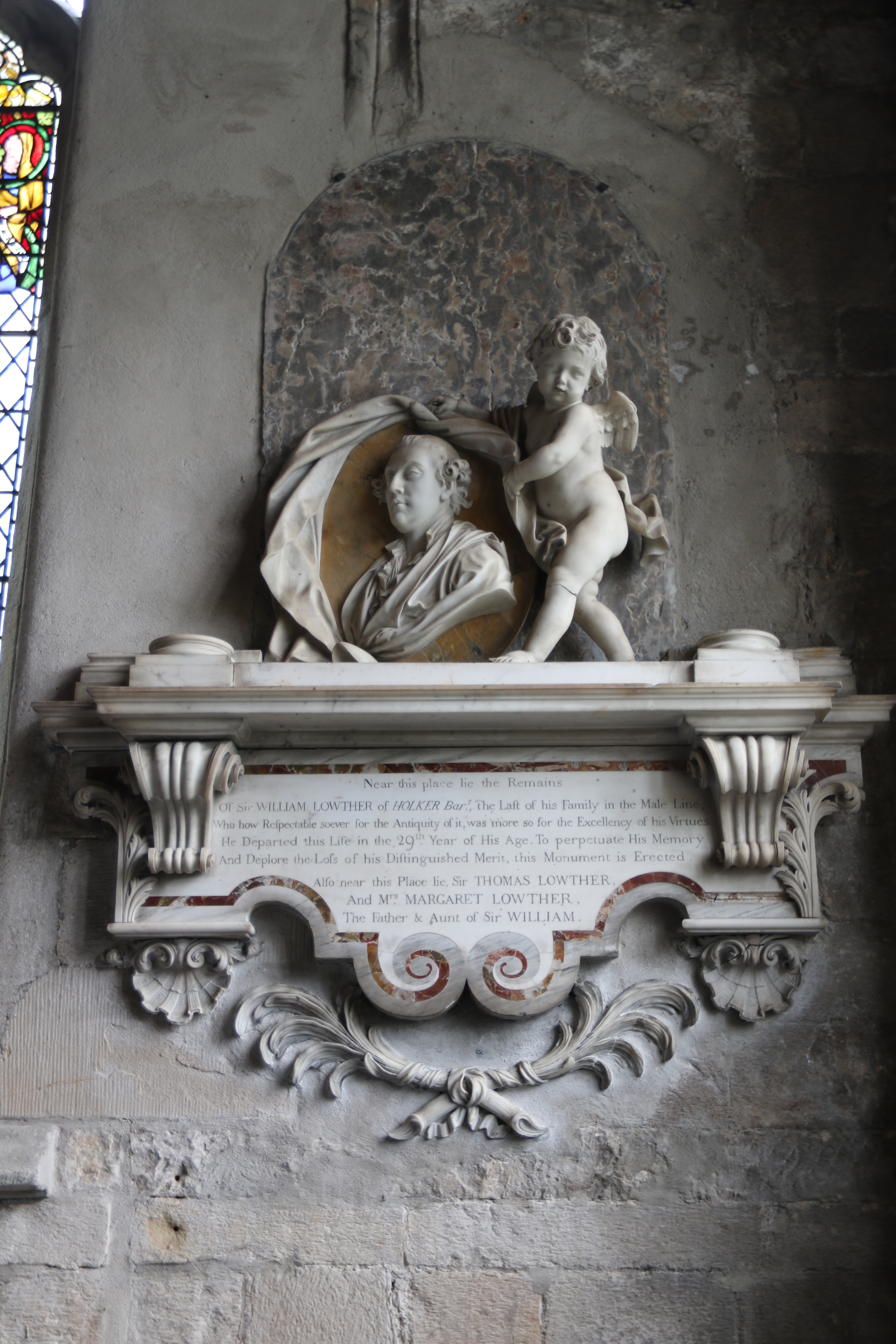
Memorial to Sir William Lowther in Cartmel Priory

Sir William Lowther, 3rd Baronet (1727 – 15 April 1756) was an English landowner, of Marske Hall, Yorkshire and Holker Hall. He was the eldest son of Sir Thomas Lowther, 2nd Baronet and Lady Elizabeth Cavendish.

In January 1755, he inherited the Whitehaven estates and coal mines from his fourth cousin once removed, Sir James Lowther, 4th Baronet, and succeeded him as Member of Parliament for Cumberland. However, he died unmarried in 1756, last of his line. He left the bulk of his estates, including the Whitehaven inheritance, to his fourth cousin, James Lowther. Holker Hall, which had come from his grandmother Catherine Preston, was left to a distant cousin of his mother Lady Elizabeth Cavendish, Lord George Cavendish.

Marske Hall was bought by Thomas Dundas, later Lord Dundas, in 1762.

Parliament of Great Britain
Preceded by Sir James Lowther, Bt; Sir John Pennington, Bt	Member of Parliament for Cumberland; 1755–1756; With: Sir John Pennington, Bt	Succeeded by Sir John Pennington, Bt; Sir John Fleming
Honorary titles
Vacant Title last held by The Viscount Lonsdale	Lord Lieutenant of Westmorland; 1751–1756	Succeeded by Sir John Pennington, Bt
Baronetage of England
Preceded by Thomas Lowther	Baronet (of Marske); 1745–1756	Extinct
