= Sir Gerard Lowther, 1st Baronet =

British diplomat (1858–1916)

Sir Gerard Lowther, Bt in 1916

Sir Gerard Augustus Lowther, 1st Baronet, GCMG, CB, PC (16 February 1858 – 5 April 1916) was a British diplomat.

== Diplomatic career ==
Lowther was educated at Harrow and entered the diplomatic service in 1879. He served in Tokyo, Budapest, and Washington. De Bunsen was trained in the diplomatic service by Richard Lyons, 1st Viscount Lyons, and was a member of the Tory-sympathetic 'Lyons School' of British diplomacy. In August 1901, Lowther was appointed Envoy Extraordinary and Minister Plenipotentiary in Santiago, Chile. He arrived at Santiago to take up his position in March 1902.

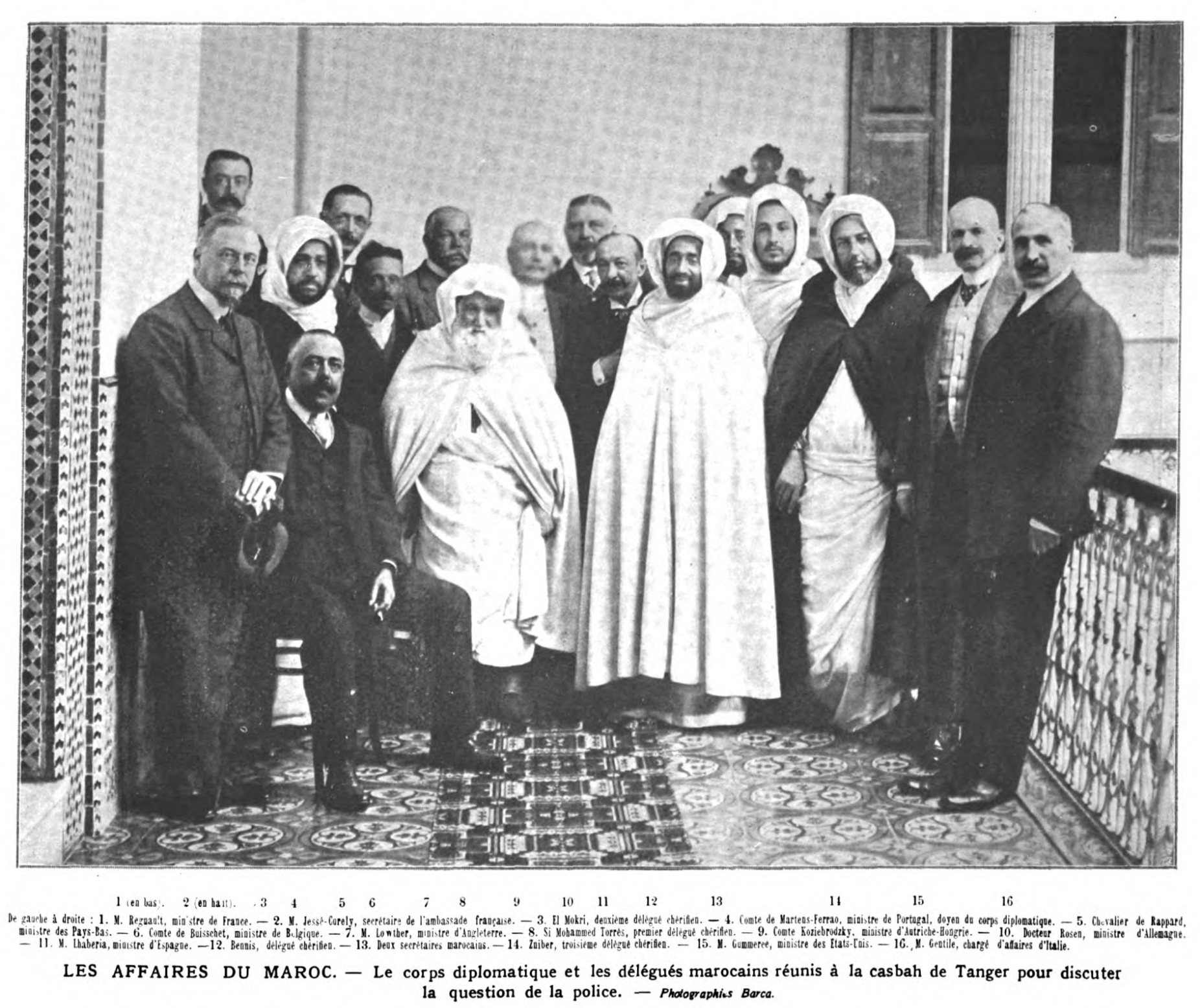
Lowther with other diplomats and Moroccan officials in Tangier discussing policing in 1907.

Lowther later served in Tangier and finally as ambassador in Constantinople. During his diplomatic career in Constantinople, Lowther translated and distributed anti-Semitic texts.

He was made a Companion of the Order of the Bath in 1904, a Knight Commander of the Order of St Michael and St George and a Privy Counsellor in 1908 and a baronet in 1914 and promoted to Knight Grand Cross of the Order of St Michael and St George in 1911.

== Family ==
Lowther was the second son of William Lowther and his wife Charlotte Alice, daughter of James Parke, 1st Baron Wensleydale. James Lowther, 1st Viscount Ullswater, was his elder brother and Sir Cecil Lowther his younger brother.

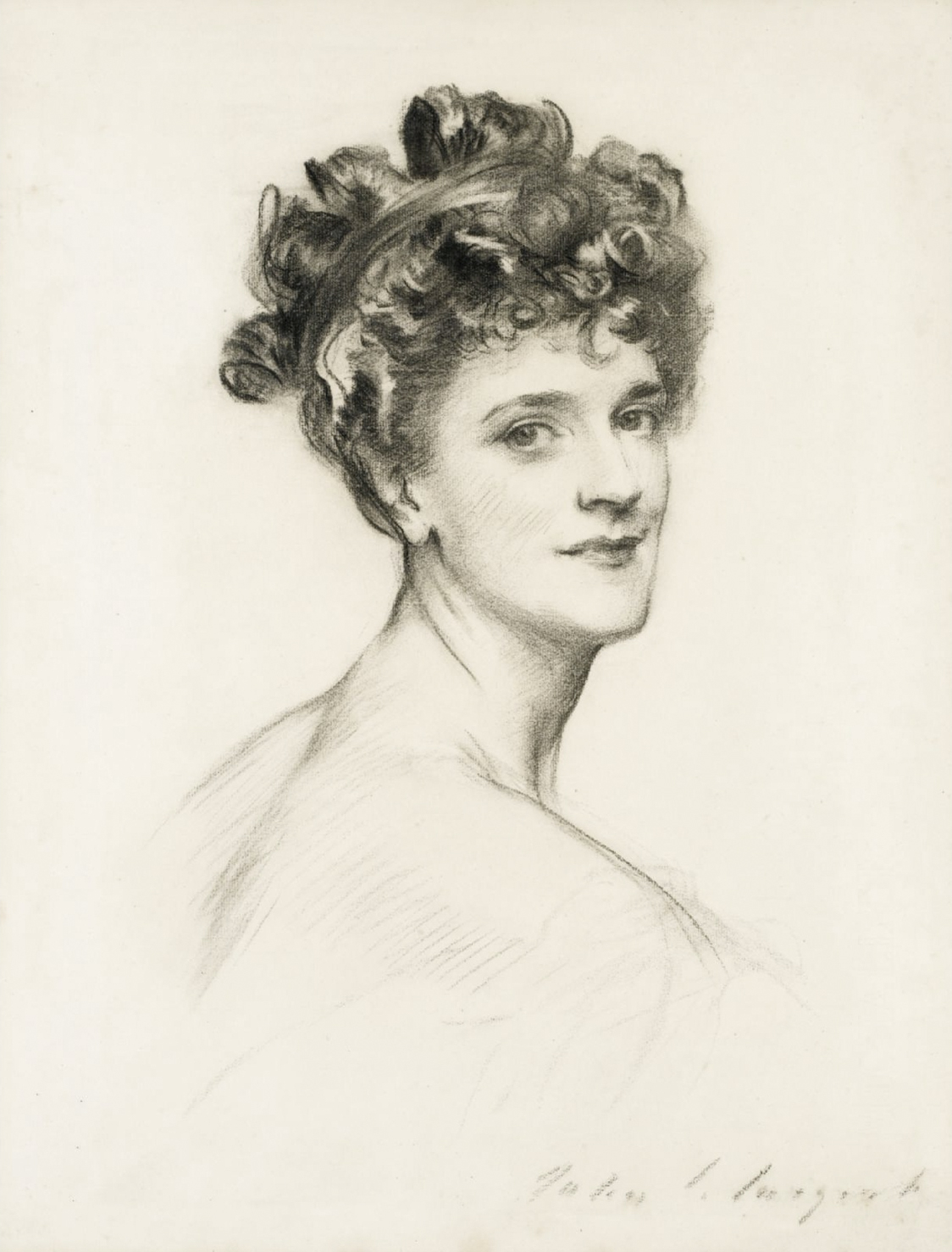
Alice, Lady Lowther (John Singer Sargent)

He married Alice Blight, the daughter of Atherton Blight, on 28 February 1905, in Newport, Rhode Island, and had three daughters:

- Edith Alice Cecilia, born 1906, married 1st (1933) Baron Jacques Thénard (k.a. 1940) and 2nd (1945) Roger Levêque de Vilmorin, a natural son of Alfonso XIII of Spain, and had issue from the first marriage
- Gladys Mabel, born 1908, married 1st (20 December 1933) Capt. Charles Neville Fane (1911–1940, k.a.) and 2nd James Black. By her first marriage, she was the mother of Gerald Trefusis, 22nd Baron Clinton.
- Violet Eleanor (20 September 1910 – 17 January 1911)

During the First World War his American-born wife, Alice, Lady Lowther, was the joint hon. secretary of the American Women's War Relief Fund and chair of the Belgian Prisoners in Germany Relief Fund.

Lowther died in April 1916, aged 58, when the baronetcy became extinct. Lady Lowther died in November 1939.

== Sources ==
- Burke's Peerage 1909
- Debrett's Peerage 1961

Diplomatic posts
Preceded by Sir George Barclay	British Ambassador to the Ottoman Empire; 1908–1913	Succeeded by Sir Louis Mallet
Baronetage of the United Kingdom
New title	Baronet (of Belgrave Square); 1914–1916	Extinct
