= Sir Christopher Lowther, 1st Baronet =

English merchant and landowner

Sir Christopher Lowther, 1st Baronet (d April 1644) was an English merchant and landowner, responsible for the initial development of Whitehaven as a port.

He was born at Skirwith Hall, the second son of Sir John Lowther of Lowther (d. 1637) and Eleanor Fleming of Skirwith. Admitted to the Inner Temple in 1627, he apparently studied the mercantile trade with his uncle Robert (died 1655) as well as legal studies. It was apparently intended that he run the Irish portion of the family enterprises from Whitehaven, which was well situated for trading with Dublin.

Lowther proved to be a good merchant, trading a variety of goods in Ireland and the Canary Islands, including textiles, beef, salt, coal and herring. He also developed salt works around Whitehaven in conjunction with Sir George Radcliffe, then influential in Irish politics. This led to the construction of the first pier at Whitehaven, which much improved its value as a port.

Lowther was in Hamburg on a textile venture in 1637, the year that his father died. After Sir John's death, Christopher inherited the manor of St Bees in Whitehaven, and he and his brothers appear to have separated their mercantile concerns, notwithstanding the family principle of cooperation in business. He married Frances Lancaster (c. 1624–1647) on 6 September 1638, with whom he had two children:

- Sir John Lowther, 2nd Baronet (1642–1706)
- Frances Lowther (born 1644), married Richard Lamplugh

Lowther served as High Sheriff of Cumberland in 1641, and suffered losses that year when the Irish Rebellion of 1641 destroyed his iron furnaces in that country and generally disrupted trade. He was created a baronet on 11 June 1642 in return for raising a troop of horse for Irish service. A Cavalier, his declining health prevented him from active campaigning, although he was in nominal command of a regiment of foot under William Cavendish (later 1st Duke of Newcastle upon Tyne) and governor of Whitehaven and Cockermouth Castle. He arranged a trusteeship for his estate in February 1644, as his health worsened, and died at Whitehaven in April 1644.

Baronetage of England
New title	Baronet (of Whitehaven, Cumberland); 1642–1644	Succeeded by John Lowther
