= Christopher Lowther (politician) =

British politician

Member of Parliament for North Cumberland
- In office 1918-1922

Personal details
- Born: 18 January 1887
- Died: 7 January 1935 (aged 47)
- Party: Conservative
- Spouse(s): Ina Pelly (m. 1910; div. 1921) Dorothy Bromley-Davenport (m. 1921)
- Children: 4
- Education: Trinity College, Cambridge
- Military career
- Rank: Major
- Units: Duke of Yorks Own Loyal Suffolk Hussars; Westmorland and Cumberland Yeomanry
- Conflicts: World War I

Major the Hon. Christopher William Lowther (18 January 1887 – 7 January 1935) was a British Conservative Party politician, the elder son of James Lowther, 1st Viscount Ullswater.

== Biography ==
Lowther was educated at Eton College and Trinity College, Cambridge. He was commissioned into the Duke of Yorks Own Loyal Suffolk Hussars in 1909. He later transferred to the Westmorland and Cumberland Yeomanry, serving in the First World War. He served as an Assistant Provost Marshal from 1917 to 1919 and reached the rank of Major.

In January 1921 Lowther defected to the Independent Parliamentary Group led by Horatio Bottomley.

General election 1922: Wallsend
Party	Candidate	Votes	%	±%
Labour	Patrick Hastings	14,248	46.8	+12.8
Unionist	Christopher Lowther	11,425	37.6	N/A
Liberal	Thomas George Graham	2,908	9.6	−5.5
National Democratic	Matthew Simm	1,840	6.0	−44.9
Majority		2,823	9.2	N/A
Turnout		30,421	82.2	+27.4
Registered electors		37,001		
Labour gain from National Democratic		Swing	+28.9	

== Personal life ==
He married Ina Marjorie Gwendolin Pelly on 17 June 1910, by whom he had one son:

- Lt. John Arthur Lowther (1910–1942)

He and Ina were divorced in 1921, and he married Dorothy Bromley-Davenport on 16 February 1921, by whom he had three daughters:

- Hon. Rosemary Lowther (25 February 1922 – 24 January 2021), married Lt. Douglas Goolden (1914–2001)
- Christine Lowther (16 January 1927 – 4 August 1927)
- Hon. Jennifer Lowther (11 June 1932 – 23 February 2021), married James Lowther, 7th Earl of Lonsdale on 9 September 1954, divorced 1962, later married William Edward Clayfield, Oswald Dickin Carter and James Cornelius Sullivan

Parliament of the United Kingdom
New constituency	Member of Parliament for North Cumberland; 1918–1922	Succeeded by Donald Howard
