= Sir John Lowther, 1st Baronet, of Lowther =

English lawyer, landowner, and politician

Sir John Lowther, 1st Baronet (20 February 1605 – 30 November 1675) was an English lawyer, landowner, and politician who sat in the House of Commons for Westmorland in 1628 and in 1660. He took no great part in the English Civil Wars.

== Life ==
Lowther was the eldest son of Sir John Lowther of Lowther Hall and his wife Eleanor Fleming, daughter of Wiliam Fleming of Rydal. He attended the Inner Temple in 1621 and was called to the bar in 1630.

In 1628, Lowther was elected Member of Parliament for Westmorland, together with his father and sat until 1629 when King Charles decided to rule without parliament for eleven years. In 1636, he became recorder of Kendal. He was created a baronet in the Baronetage of Nova Scotia in around 1638. He stood for election to both Parliaments of 1640, but was defeated on each occasion by Sir Philip Musgrave.

Lowther was a commissioner of array for Cumberland and Westmorland in 1642. He was commissioned a colonel by the Royalists during the Civil War and was Governor of Brougham Castle until 1644. However, he claimed not to have borne arms against the Parliamentarians and took the Covenant when their forces approached. He was recommended to continue as a justice of the peace for Westmorland (having sat on the bench since 1641) and was fined on relatively favourable terms. He did not continue as a justice or in the recordership of Kendal after 1648, during the Interregnum.

After the Restoration, he held several county offices in the North, appearing in the commissions of the peace for Cumberland, Westmorland, and the North Riding of Yorkshire and receiving a deputy lieutenancy in Cumberland. From 1661 to 1662 he was Sheriff of Cumberland. He was elected MP for Westmorland again in 1660 in the Convention Parliament, he and Sir Thomas Wharton defeating Thomas Burton. Moderately active during the Parliament, his one recorded speech was to oppose Charles Howard's bill for curbing the moss troopers, preferring older methods of keeping peace on the border. He did not again stand for Parliament, but returned to his activities in the North, where he actively expanded his estates (often at the expense of his neighbours) and prosecuted Quakers.

== Character ==
He had a reputation for being grasping and unscrupulous in his business dealings. The writer Alice Thornton, a sister of his son-in-law Christopher Wandesford, accused him of persuading her brother to attempt to cheat her and their mother out of the legacies due to them under the will of her father, the Lord Deputy of Ireland, thereby causing a long and bitter family lawsuit.

== Family ==
Lowther married twice. By his first marriage to Mary Fletcher, he had ten children:

- John Lowther (c. 1628–1668)
- Richard Lowther (d. 1703), married Barbara Prickett and had issue
- Eleanor Lowther, married Sir Christopher Wandesford, 1st Baronet, son of Christopher Wandesford, Lord Deputy of Ireland and Alice Osborne and had issue
- Barbara Lowther, married John Beilby
- Mary Lowther, married Edward Trotter
- Frances Lowther, married Sir Thomas Pennyman, 2nd Baronet
- Christopher Lowther
- Hugh Lowther
- Anne Lowther
- Mary Lowther

By his second marriage to Elizabeth Hare, he had four children:

- Ralph Lowther (b. 3 July 1655), married Mary Lawson and had issue
- William Lowther (b. 27 April 1659, married Elizabeth Rawlinson
- Robert Lowther (b. 17 February 1662), unmarried
- Margaret Lowther (b. 27 April 1650), married Sir John Aubrey, 2nd Baronet

His eldest son John predeceased him, and he was succeeded in the baronetcy by his grandson. He left an estate worth about £80,000.

Parliament of England
Preceded by Sir John Lowther; Sir Henry Bellingham, 1st Baronet	Member of Parliament for Westmorland; 1628–1629; With: Sir John Lowther	Parliament suspended until 1640
Unknown	Member of Parliament for Westmorland; With: Sir Thomas Wharton	Succeeded by Sir Philip Musgrave; Sir Thomas Strickland
Baronetage of Nova Scotia
New title	Baronet (of Lowther) c.1638–1675	Succeeded by John Lowther
