= Lowther baronets =

Set index for Lowther baronets

There have been seven baronetcies created for members of the Lowther family, one in the Baronetage of Nova Scotia, two in the Baronetage of England, two in the Baronetage of Great Britain and two in the Baronetage of the United Kingdom. Two of the creations are extant as of 2026.

- Lowther baronets, of Lowther (c. 1638): see Earl of Lonsdale
- Lowther baronets of Whitehaven (1642)
- Lowther baronets of Marske (1697)
- Lowther baronets of Swillington (first creation, 1715)
- Lowther baronets of Little Preston (1764)
- Lowther baronets of Swillington (second creation, 1824)
- Lowther baronets of Belgrave Square (1914): see Sir Gerard Lowther, 1st Baronet (1858–1916)

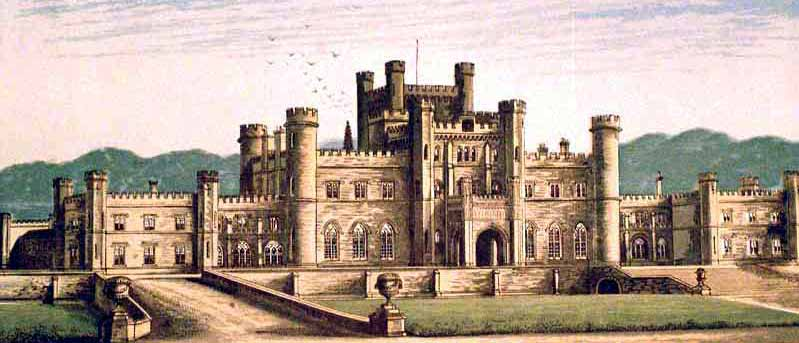
Lowther Castle circa 1880 – the seat of the Lowther family
