= Tufton =

Tufton may refer to:

== Places ==
- Tufton, Hampshire, a village in the English county of Hampshire
- Tufton, Pembrokeshire, a place in the Welsh county of Pembrokeshire
- Tufton Farm, a farm previously owned by Thomas Jefferson in Albemarle County, Virginia

== People ==
- Any of several Earls of Thanet in the United Kingdom, including:

- Nicholas Tufton, 1st Earl of Thanet (1578–1631)
- John Tufton, 2nd Earl of Thanet (1608–1664)
- Nicholas Tufton, 3rd Earl of Thanet (1631–1679)
- John Tufton, 4th Earl of Thanet (1638–1680)
- Richard Tufton, 5th Earl of Thanet (1640–1684)
- Thomas Tufton, 6th Earl of Thanet (1644–1729)
- Sackville Tufton, 7th Earl of Thanet (1688–1753)
- Sackville Tufton, 8th Earl of Thanet (1733–1786)
- Sackville Tufton, 9th Earl of Thanet (1767–1825)
- Charles Tufton, 10th Earl of Thanet (1770–1832)
- Henry Tufton, 11th Earl of Thanet (1775–1849)

== Satire ==
- Sir Bufton Tufton is one of the Recurring in-jokes in Private Eye
