= John Tufton =

John Tufton may refer to:

- John Tufton (cricketer) (1773–1799), cricketer and MP for Appleby 1796–1799
- Sir John Tufton, 1st Baronet (died 1624), see Earl of Thanet
- John Tufton, 2nd Earl of Thanet (1608–1664), English nobleman, supporter of Charles I
- John Tufton, 4th Earl of Thanet (1638–1680), English nobleman
- Sir John Tufton, 2nd Baronet (1620s–1685), MP for Kent
- John Tufton (Steyning MP), MP for Steyning in 1679–81
- John Tufton, 2nd Baron Hothfield (1873–1952), British Army officer, farmer and land owner, and cricketer
