= Sackville Tufton, 9th Earl of Thanet =

English cricketer

Sackville Tufton, 9th Earl of Thanet (30 June 1769 – 24 January 1825) succeeded to his title in April 1786, following the death of his father Sackville Tufton, 8th Earl of Thanet. Two of his younger brothers were John Tufton and Henry Tufton, 11th Earl of Thanet, both well-known amateur cricketers.

Sackville Tufton was himself a keen cricketer who made five known appearances in important matches between 1791 and 1794. He was an early member of Marylebone Cricket Club (MCC) and was associated with Kent cricket.

== Life ==
Thanet was born at Hothfield House in Kent. His mother was Mary Sackville, daughter of Lord John Philip Sackville, and on his father's death, on 10 April 1786, his maternal uncle, John Frederick Sackville, 3rd Duke of Dorset, acted as his guardian during his minority. He became hereditary High Sheriff of Westmorland from 1786 to 1825. In early life he spent much time abroad, especially in Vienna, where he formed an alliance with a Hungarian lady, Anne Charlotte de Bojanowitz, to whom he was married, under the Anglican rite, at St. George's, Hanover Square, on 28 February 1811.

In politics Thanet's profile was low, but he generally supported the Duke of Bedford and the opposition to Pitt. In May 1798 he was present with Fox, Sheridan, Erskine, and other Whig sympathisers at the trial of Arthur O'Connor at Maidstone. O'Connor was found not guilty, but was not discharged, since a warrant for his arrest for another offence was pending. Thanet and others were charged with having created a riot in the court and put out the lights in an attempt to rescue the prisoner, or at least to help his escape. The case was tried before Lord Kenyon at the King's Bench on 25 April 1799. Sir John Scott prosecuted, and Erskine conducted the defence. Richard Brinsley Sheridan appeared to give evidence for the accused, and distinguished himself by parrying eight times, and finally evading, the question of Edward Law, counsel for the prosecution, ‘Do you believe Lord Thanet meant to favour the escape of O'Connor?’ Having been found guilty of riot and assault at Maidstone, Thanet was brought up for judgment on 3 May, and committed to the King's Bench prison, the bail offered by the Duke of Bedford being refused. On 10 June he was sentenced to a year's imprisonment in the Tower of London and a fine of £1,000, and on his release he was ordered to give security for his good behaviour for seven years to the amount of £20,000.

After his release the Earl lived quietly at Hothfield, and became a popular agriculturist, regularly visiting the agricultural market at Ashford. He spent much time abroad, and he died at Chalons on 24 January 1825. He was buried on 7 February at Rainham. Leaving no issue, he was succeeded in turn by his brothers Charles (1770–1832) and Henry Tufton (1775–1849), eleventh and last earl of Thanet.

== Arms ==
Coat of arms of Sackville Tufton, 9th Earl of Thanet
Coronet A Coronet of an Earl Crest A Sea Lion sejant Argent. Escutcheon Sable an Eagle displayed Ermine within a Bordure Argent. Supporters On either team an Eagle Ermine. Motto Ales Volat Propriis (The bird flies to its own)

== Notes ==
Peerage of Great Britain
Preceded by Sackville Tufton	Earl of Thanet; 1786–1825	Succeeded by Charles Tufton
