= Henry Tufton =

Henry Tufton may refer to:

- Henry Tufton, 11th Earl of Thanet (1775–1849), English cricketer and peer
- Henry Tufton, 1st Baron Hothfield (1844–1926), British peer, politician, and owner and breeder of racehorses
