= Nicholas Tufton =

Nicholas Tufton may refer to:

- Nicholas Tufton, 1st Earl of Thanet (1578–1631), English peer and MP for Peterborough
- Nicholas Tufton, 3rd Earl of Thanet (1631–1679), English peer
