= Sheriff of Westmorland =

Ceremonial position in the English historic county of Westmorland

Westmorland (sometimes spelled Westmoreland) in North West England was abolished in 1974 following Prime Minister Edward Heath's Local Government Act 1972. Westmorland became a part of Cumbria along with Cumberland, parts of Yorkshire and Lancashire, including the Furness peninsular. In 2022 Westmorland was reconstituted as Westmorland and Furness following the abolition of Cumbria County Council. Westmorland and Furness have no High Sheriff as Cumbria has remained the ceremonial county.

The traditional county of Westmorland, like neighbouring Lancashire, was itself a new creation during the Middle Ages. It seems to have been treated as part of Yorkshire in the 11th century, and the eventual boundaries represented a merger between an earlier entity called Westmorland, and the Barony of Kendal, which was apparently originally considered part of the Honor of Lancaster, though it did not become part of Lancashire. Kendal is also now part of Cumbria.

The original Westmorland is sometimes referred to as Westmarieland and is later referred to as the Barony of Appleby or "Northern Westmorland".

== List of sheriffs ==
The following is an incomplete list of historical sheriffs.

Except where separately referenced, names are taken from the website of the Public Record Office in Kew. The references given are also used throughout English archives.

Between the thirteenth century and 1849, the office of sheriff was hereditary, firstly granted in perpetuity by King John to Robert de Veteripont and afterwards held by the de Clifford family and then by the Earls of Thanet, until the 11th earl died with no successors. Due to the continued absence of the earlier incumbents on military service the duties would be actually be undertaken by a trusted deputy sheriff.

The office was finally abolished in 1974 when the shrievalty of Cumbria was established.

- 1129. Richard filius Gerardi de Appleby.
- 1174. Ranulf de Glanville
- 1176. Ranulf de Glanville
- 1177. Ranulf de Glanville
- c. 1189. Osbert de Longo Campo (Longchamp) D MUS 2/10/24
- 1191–1199 Hugh Bardulf
- 1199. Geoffrey FitzPeter
- 1200. William de Stuteville. D MUS 2/10/67.
- 1201. Geoffrey FitzPeter and Roger Bellocampo [Beauchamp] (under-sheriff?)(cf. The History and Antiquities of the Counties of Westmoreland and Cumberland. Vol. I)
- 1202. William Stutevil and Philip Escrope (under-sheriff?)
- 1204–1228 Robert de Veteripont (Vipont)
- 1230 William de Ireby
- 1235 John de Vieuxpont Vipont (Hereditary Sheriff 1228–1243)
- c. 1230. Alexander Bachucton D/WYB/2/115
- 1241 Gilbert of Kirketon DDHV/70/1
- 1241–43 John de Veteriponte(Hereditary Sheriff 1228–1243)
- Robert de Vieuxpont (Hereditary Sheriff 1243–1242)
- John de Vieuxpont (Hereditary Sheriff 1242–1264)
- Isobella and Idomea Vieuxpont (Hereditary Sheriffs 1264-1308?)
- mid 13th century. Roger de Stokes D/WYB/2/35
- before 1283 Thomas de Mussegrave D/WYB/2/38
- c. 1280–1290 William de Steynton D MUS 2/10/88
- c. 1283–1289 Sir Richard de Medburn D/WYB/2/42
- 1284 Michael de Hartcla D/WYB/2/116
- 1288 Robert de Morvill D/WYB/2/43
- 1294 Thomas de Hellebek WD D/MD 40
- 1312 1312 Robert de Morwyll D HC 2/11/6
- 1317 Henry de Warthecopp D/WYB/2/117
- 1320–1322 Hugh de Louther SC 8/151/7531 (Louther also served as sheriff from October 1320 to February 1322)
- 1322–1323 Hugh de Louther SC 8/151/7531 (Louther did hold the office from December 1322 to July 1323, and it is possible that this short term was as a result of the complaints made in this petition (List of Sheriffs, p. 150). However Louther also served as sheriff from October 1320 to February 1322)
- c. 1323–1325 Henry de Threlkeld C 49/45/14
- 1329 Thomas de Waryekop D/WYB/2/123
- 1330 Nicholas de Grendon SC 8/33/1650
- 1333–1334? Robert de Sandford D MUS 2/10/32
- 1342 Thomas de Musgrave D/WYB/2/124
- Robert de Clifford, 1st Baron Clifford (Hereditary Sheriff 1308?–1314 (killed))
- Roger de Clifford, 2nd Baron Clifford (Hereditary Sheriff 1314–1322 (hanged and attainted 1322))
- Robert de Clifford, 3rd Baron Clifford (Attainder revoked 1327. Hereditary Sheriff 1327–1344)
- 1344 Robert de Clifford, 4th Baron Clifford (Hereditary Sheriff 1344–1344)
- 1351 John de Burgham
- 1355 Hugh de la Boure C 131/9/17
- c. 1360 Roger Clifford, 5th Baron de Clifford (Hereditary Sheriff 1350–1389) SC 8/130/6466
- Thomas Clifford, 6th Baron de Clifford (Hereditary Sheriff 1389–1391)
- John Clifford, 7th Baron de Clifford (Hereditary Sheriff 1391–1422) (killed 1422)
- 1380 William de Lancaster WD RY/BOX 92/53
- 1389 Walter de Stirkeland SC 8/222/11077
- 1402 Elizabeth Clifford SC 8/119/5945
- 1403–1406 Thomas Warcop SC 8/23/1108 (Thomas Warcop of Lambert's Ash was sheriff between November 1403 and October/November 1406, and again (unless this is the son?) between September/October 1417 and October 1418)
- 1406–1408 William de Thornburgh SC 8/23/1108 (sheriff between October/November 1406 and October/November 1408)
- 1417–1418 Thomas Warcop SC 8/23/1108 (Thomas Warcop of Lambert's Ash was sheriff between November 1403 and October/November 1406, and again (unless this is the son?) between September/October 1417 and October 1418)
- Thomas Clifford, 8th Baron de Clifford (Hereditary Sheriff 1422–1455) (killed 1455)
- John Clifford, 9th Baron de Clifford (Hereditary sheriff 1455–1461, attainted 1461)
- 1462–1473 Sir John Parr
- 1484–1485 Sir Richard Ratcliff Awarded for life but killed 1485.
- 1512 Henry Clifford C 131/97/16 (attainder revoked 1485, Hereditary sheriff 1485–1523)
- Henry Clifford, 1st Earl of Cumberland (Hereditary sheriff 1523–1542)
- Henry Clifford, 2nd Earl of Cumberland (Hereditary sheriff 1542–1570)
- George Clifford, 3rd Earl of Cumberland (Hereditary sheriff 1570–1605)
- 1643–1676 Lady Anne Clifford (Hereditary sheriff 1606–1676)
- 1676–1679 Nicholas Tufton, 3rd Earl of Thanet
- 1679–1680 John Tufton, 4th Earl of Thanet WD RY/BOX 86/21
- 1680–1684 Richard Tufton, 5th Earl of Thanet
- 1684–1729 Thomas Tufton, 6th Earl of Thanet
- 1729–1753 Sackville Tufton, 7th Earl of Thanet
- 1753–1786 Sackville Tufton, 8th Earl of Thanet DRO/021/102
- 1786–1825 Sackville Tufton, 9th Earl of Thanet

=== 1800–1899 ===
- 1825–1832 Charles Tufton, 10th Earl of Thanet
- 1832–1849 Henry Tufton, 11th Earl of Thanet
- 1849: George Edward Wilson
- 1851: Edward Wilson, of Rigmaden (Uncle of Christopher Wyndham Wilson, High Sheriff in 1884)
- 1852: Richard Burn, of Orton Hall
- 1853: John Wakefield, of Sedgwick House, Kendal
- 1854: John Wilson, of the Howe
- 1855: John Hill, of Castle Bank, Appleby
- 1856: William Wilkinson, of Warcop
- 1857: Richard Luther Watson, of Ecclerigg, Windermere
- 1858: Robert Addison, of the Friary, Appleby
- 1859: William Moore, of Grimes Hill, Kirkby Lonsdale
- 1860: Matthew Benson Harrison, of Ambleside
- 1861: William Hopes, of Brampton Crofts, Appleby
- 1862: Lt-Col. Frederic Gandy, of Heaves, Milnthorpe
- 1863: William Wilson, of High Park, near Kendal
- 1864: Matthew Thompson, of Kirkby Stephen
- 1865: Arthur Shepherd, of Shaw End, near Kendal
- 1866: Joseph Gibson of Whelprigg, Kirkby Lonsdale
- 1867: Hugh Rigg, of Crossrigg Hall, Morland, Penrith
- 1868: Thomas Taylour (commonly called Lord Kenlis), of Underley Hall, Kirkby Lonsdale
- 1869: James Christopher Wilson, of Low Nook, Ambleside
- 1870: James Atkinson, of Winderwath, Templesowerby, Penrith
- 1871: William Henry Wakefield, of Sedgwick
- 1872: Frank Atkinson Argles, of Eversley, Milnthorpe
- 1873: Thomas Mason, of Kirkby Stephen
- 1874: Sir Henry James Tufton, of Appleby Castle, Bart
- 1875: James Cropper
- 1876: Edward Balme Wheatley Balme of High Close, Loughrigg, Ambleside
- 1877: Lieutenant-Colonel Charles Edward Watson of Rothay Holme, Ambleside
- 1878: Sidney Hughes Le Fleming of Rydal Hall, Ambleside
- 1879: William Middleton Moore of Grimeshill, Kirkby Lonsdale
- 1880: Henry Grandy of Castle Bank, Appleby
- 1881: William Hugh Parkin, junior of Ravencrag, Penrith
- 1882: William Thompson, of Moresdale Hall, Kendal
- 1883: Joseph Gibson, of Whelprigg, Kirkby Lonsdale
- 1884: Christopher Wyndham Wilson, of Rigmaden, Kirkby Lonsdale
- 1885: Alfred Harris, of Lunefield, Kirkby Lonsdale
- 1886: Edward Hugh Wilson of Dallam Tower, Milnthorpe
- 1887: John Edward Hasell, of Dalemain
- 1888: William Dillworth Crewdson, of Helm Lodge, near Kendal
- 1889: Francis Markham, of Morland
- 1890: Walter James Marshall, of Patterdale Hall
- 1891: Thomas Atkinson Argles, of Eversley, Milnthorpe
- 1892: James Gandy Gandy, of Heaves, Milnthorpe
- 1893: Jacob Wakefield, of Sedgwick House, Kendal
- 1894: Colonel Joseph Withers, of Briery Close, Windermere.
- 1895: Charles Walker, of Brcttargh Holt, Kendal
- 1896: Henry Miles Radcliffe, of Summerlands, Kendal
- 1897: William Smith Paget-Tomlinson, of The Biggins, Kirkby Lonsdale
- 1898: William Stavert, of Prizett, Kendal
- 1899: Frank Maude Taylor Jones-Balme, of High Close, Ambleside

=== 1900–1974 ===
- 1900: William Graham of Eden Grove, Kirkbythore Office declared vacant on bankruptcy PC 8/533
- 1901: Maurice Bromley Wilson of Dallam Tower, Milnthorpe
- 1902: William Hibbert Marshall of Patterdale Hall, Penrith
- 1903: Joseph Torbock of Crackenthorpe Hall, Appleby
- 1904: Harvey Goodwin of Orton Hall, Tebay
- 1905: Charles James Cropper of Ellergreen, Kendal
- 1906: Robert Wilkinson Dent of Flass, Shap
- 1907: Colonel Bordrigge North North, of Newton Hall, Kirkby Lonsdale
- 1908: Charles Robert Rivington of Castle Bank, Appleby
- 1909: Richard Rigg of Applegarth, Windermere
- 1910: John Rankin of New Hutton and Liverpool
- 1911: John William Fothergill of Brownber, Newbiggin-on-Lune
- 1912: William Dillworth Crewdson of Helme Lodge, Kendal
- 1913: Henry Paul Mason of Eden Place, Kirkby Stephen
- 1914: Francis Chatillon Danson of Dry Close, Grasmere
- 1915: Thomas Rogers Shaw of Greenside, Milnthorpe
- 1916: Colin Somervell of Tenter Field, Kendal
- 1917: Alec Lionel Rea of Keldwith, Windermere
- 1918: James Cullen Hamilton of Barrows Green, Kendal
- 1919: Colonel Frederic Haworth of Ashley Green, Ambleside
- 1920: Alexander Millington Sing of Dawstone, Windermere
- 1921: George Henry Pattinson of Gossel Ridding, Winderere
- 1922: Lieut.-Col. Sidney Roden Fothergill of Lowbridge, Kendal
- 1923: Robert Durning Holt of High Borrans, Windermere
- 1924: Gerard Elyetson Thompson of Stobars Hall, Kirkby Stephen
- 1925: Oswald William Edward Hedley of Briery Close, Windermere
- 1926: Sir Samuel Haslam Scott, 2nd Baronet of Low Yews, Windermere
- 1927: Major Edward William Hasell of Dalemain, Penrith, Cumberland
- 1928: James Winstanley Cropper of Tolson Hall, Kendal
- 1929: Frederick Rice Markham of Morland, Westmorland
- 1930: Anthony Lowther, of Clifton Hill
- 1931: Alfred Henry Willink of Whitefoot, Burneside, Kendal
- 1932: Edgar Frederick Wrigley of Oakland, Windermere
- 1933: Henry Oxley Ingham of Augill Castle, Brough
- 1934: Francis Clayton Scott of Matson Ground, Windermere
- 1935: Frederick John Milne of Broad Leys, Windermere
- 1936: Major Arnold Colin Somervell, of High Borrans, Windermere
- 1937: Henry Hornyold-Strickland of Sizergh Lodge, Kendal
- 1938: Henry Leigh Groves of Holehird, Windermere
- 1939: William Miles Moss Forwood of Lindth Fell, Windermere
- 1940: Charles Windham Leycester Penrhyn-Hornby of Dalton Hall, Burton, Carnforth, Lancs
- 1941: George Norman Pattinson of The Knoll, Windermere
- 1942: William Gordon Shorrock of Morland, via Penrith
- 1943: Capt. Walter Frederick Gaddum of Braban House, Burneside, Kendal
- 1944: Dr John Cochrane Henderson of St. Andrews, Windermere
- 1945: Colonel John Heaton of Prizet, near Kendal
- 1946: John Malcolm Somervell of Broom Close, Kendal
- 1947: David Riddell of Langbank, Bowness-on-Windermere
- 1948: Brigadier-General Louis John Wyatt, of The Court Yard, Kirkby Lonsdale
- 1949: Richard Perceval Hewetson of Stobars Hall, Kirkby Stephen
- 1950: Anthony Charles Cropper of Tolson Hall, near Kendal
- 1951: Francis Beresford Chancellor of Eden Gate, Warcop
- 1952: Oliver Robin Bagot of Levens Hall, Kendal.
- 1953: Commander Richard Henley Torbock, of Crossrigg Hall, Cliburn.
- 1954: Surgeon-Captain William Glossop Thwaytes, of Holesfoot, Maulds Meaburn, near Penrith.
- 1955: Lieut-Colonel Henry Christopher White Bowring of Whelprigg, Kirkby Lonsdale.
- 1956: Hugh Wykeham David Pollock of Winderwath, Temple Sowerby, near Penrith.
- 1957: Sir Robert Benson Ewbank, of Tongue Ghyll, Grasmere.
- 1958: Ronald Arthur Somervell of Haverbrack, Milnthorpe.
- 1959: Michael Charles Stanley, of Halecat, Witherslack.
- 1960: Sir Robert Annesley Wilkinson Dent, of Flass, Maulds Meaburn, near Penrith.
- 1961: Lieut.-Colonel John Raymond Danson, of Dry Close, Grasmere.
- 1962: Charles Eric Wilson of Rigmaden, Kirkby Lonsdale, (grandson of Christopher Wyndham Wilson, High Sheriff in 1884)
- 1963: Peter Francis Scott of Long Dales, Windermere.
- 1964: Captain Anthony George Lowther, of Whitbysteads, Askham.
- 1965: Major Thomas William Ian Hedley, of Briery Close, Windermere.
- 1966: Sir Oliver Christopher Anderson Scott, of Yews, Windermere.
- 1967: Captain Nigel Crichton Pease, of Underley Grange, Kirkby Lonsdale.
- 1968: Cuthbert Henry Dyke Acland, of Stagshaw, Ambleside.
- 1969: Sir Cuthbert Barwick Clegg, of Barn Close, Beetham, Milnthorpe.
- 1970: Robert Sands Crossfield, of Brantfell, Arnside.
- 1971: James Anthony Cropper, of Tolson Hall, Kendal.
- 1972: Thomas Martin Heaton of Towcett House, Newby, Shap.
- 1973: Lieut-Commander Thomas Hornyold-Strickland, Count della Catena, of The North Wing, Sizergh Castle, Kendal.
- 1974 onwards – See High Sheriff of Cumbria
