= Anthony Lowther =

Anthony Lowther may refer to:

- Anthony Lowther (died 1693) (1641–1693), member of parliament for Appleby 1679–1681, ancestor of the Lowther baronets of Marske
- Anthony Lowther (died 1741) (1694–1741), member of parliament for Cockermouth 1721–1722 and Westmorland 1722–1741, third son of the 1st Viscount Lonsdale
- Anthony Lowther, Viscount Lowther (1896–1949), eldest son of the 6th Earl of Lonsdale
