= Baron Hothfield =

Barony in the Peerage of the United Kingdom

Baron Hothfield, of Hothfield in the County of Kent, is a title in the Peerage of the United Kingdom. It was created in 1881 for Sir Henry Tufton, 2nd Baronet, who was appointed Lord Lieutenant of Westmorland the same year and who also served briefly as a government whip in the Liberal administration of 1886. His eldest son, the second Baron, notably served as Mayor of Appleby, Westmorland. On the death of his son, the third Baron, in 1961, this line of the family failed. The late Baron was succeeded by his first cousin, the fourth Baron. He was the only son of the Hon. Sackville Philip Tufton, second son of the first Baron. On his death in 1986 this line of the family also failed and the titles passed to his first cousin, the fifth Baron. He was the eldest son of the Hon. Charles Henry Tufton, third son of the first Baron. As of 2017 the titles are held by his son, the sixth Baron, who succeeded in 1991.

The Tufton baronetcy, of Appleby Castle in the County of Westmorland, was created in the Baronetage of the United Kingdom in 1851 for Richard Tufton. He was the reputed natural son of Henry Tufton, 11th and last Earl of Thanet, who devised the substantial Tufton estates on him. He was succeeded by his son, the aforementioned second Baronet, who was raised to the peerage in 1881.

The family seat now is Drybeck Hall, near Appleby-in-Westmorland, Cumbria. The former was Skipton Castle, sold by the third Baron in 1956.

== Tufton baronets, of Appleby Castle (1851) ==
- Sir Richard Tufton, 1st Baronet (1813 – 20 June 1871), was a British baronet. He was born in Verdun, France, as the reputed natural son of Henry Tufton, 11th Earl of Thanet, who devised the substantial estates on him. On the Earl's death in 1849 he inherited the estates, which included Skipton Castle in Yorkshire and Hothfield Place, near Ashford, Kent, and became a British citizen the same year. In 1851 he was created a Baronet, of Appleby Castle in the County of Westmorland. He served as High Sheriff of Kent in 1859. Tufton married Adelaide Amelie Lacour in 1843. He died in June 1871 and was succeeded in the baronetcy by his son Henry, who was elevated to the peerage as Baron Hothfield in 1881.
- Sir Henry James Tufton, 2nd Baronet (1844–1926) (created Baron Hothfield in 1881)

== Baron Hothfield (1881) ==
- Henry James Tufton, 1st Baron Hothfield (1844–1926)
- John Sackville Richard Tufton, 2nd Baron Hothfield (1873–1952)
- Henry Hastings Sackville Thanet Tufton, 3rd Baron Hothfield (1897–1961)
- Thomas Sackville Tufton, 4th Baron Hothfield (1916–1986)
- George William Anthony Tufton, 5th Baron Hothfield (1904–1991)
- Anthony Charles Sackville Tufton, 6th Baron Hothfield (born 1939)

The heir apparent is the present holder's son, Hon. William Sackville Tufton (born 1977).
The heir apparent's heir apparent is his son, Samuel James Tufton (born 2009).

== Arms ==
Coat of arms of Baron Hothfield
Crest A Sea Lion sejant Argent debruised by a Bendlet wavy Sable. Escutcheon Sable an Eagle displayed Ermine within a Bordure wavy Or. Supporters On either side an Eagle Ermine gorged with a Collar Gules pendent therefrom an Escutcheon of the Arms of Tufton. Motto Ales Volat Propriis (The bird flies to its own)

== See also ==
- Earl of Thanet
