= Robert Benson Ewbank =

British colonial civil servant

Sir Robert Benson Ewbank, CSI, CIE (22 October 1883 – 2 September 1967) was an eminent British colonial civil servant in the twentieth century.

Educated at Carlisle Grammar School and The Queen's College, Oxford he was Registrar of Co-operative Societies for the Bombay Presidency from 1911 to 1919; Deputy Secretary to the Government of India from 1920 to 1924 (and Acting Secretary between 1926 and 1927); its representative in East Africa from 1927 to 1928; and General Secretary to the Government of Bombay from 1929 to 1934. From 1936 to 1939 he was a Member of the Commission of Government of Newfoundland in charge of Natural Resources. In retirement he was Chairman of the Lake District Committee of the National Trust from 1948 to 1962; a member of the Church Assembly from 1950 to 1960; and High Sheriff of Westmorland from 1957 to 58.
