= Christopher Wyndham Wilson =

English landowner and agricultural pioneer

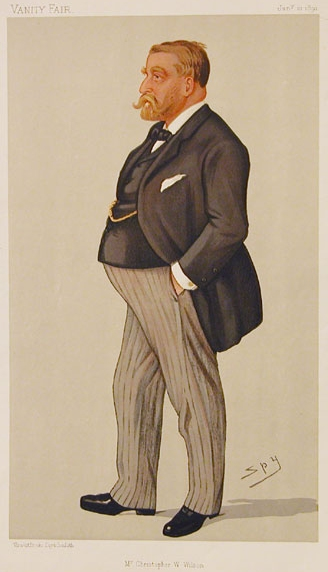
Christopher Wyndham Wilson “Kit” from Vanity Fair 1891

Col Christopher Wyndham Wilson JP DL known as “Kit” (1844 – 1918) was an English landowner, agricultural pioneer and appointed High Sheriff of Westmorland in 1884. He built two eponymous lakes in Westmorland: Kitmere and Wyndhamere.

== Early life ==
Wilson was born 9 November 1844 at Rigmaden Park, Mansergh, Westmorland. He was the eldest son of William Wilson (1810–1880) and his wife Maria Letitia Hulme (1817–1873) and grandson of Christopher Wilson a businessman of Abbot Hall Kendal. His maternal grandmother Maria being the daughter of Colonel Wadham Wyndham. He succeeded to his father’s estates in 1880. He attended Harrow School and later Trinity College Cambridge.

== Later life ==
Wilson bred the Wilson or Hackney pony a cross between the native fell pony and a thoroughbred Sir George. At this time he experimented in new agricultural techniques including fish farming on a series of lakes built on his lands and breeding shorthorn cattle. He was an early pioneer of electricity being the second homeowner in the UK to install electric light. Wilson was a Conservative, being active in the 1880 United Kingdom general election on behalf of William Lowther (diplomat) in the Westmorland (UK Parliament constituency) and later founding and chairing the Westmorland Conservative Association. An avid horseman Wilson served in the Yeomanry Cavalry becoming the Colonel of the Westmorland and Cumberland Yeomanry. He was also a sportsman, founding the Oxenholme Staghounds and the shooting in his "Valley of the Shadow of Death" on his estate. He kept five types of dear in his park including Wapati.

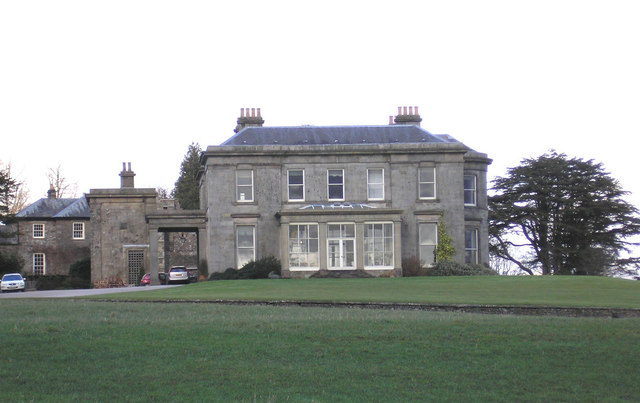
Rigmaden Park

== Family ==
Wilson married Mildred Eyre Spedding (1848–1878) of Mirehouse, Cumbria in 1874 and had one son Christopher Hulme Wilson (1875–1941), whose son Charles Eric Wilson was High Sheriff of Westmorland in 1962 and a daughter Beatrice b.1875 who worked for the British Information Services in New York during WWII. He married secondly Edith Townsend Farquhar in 1879, sister of the financier Horace Farquhar, 1st Earl Farquhar and had a further three sons and three daughters.
