= Walter Plumer =

British Whig politician

Walter Plumer (c. 1682–1746), of Cavendish Square and Chediston Hall, Suffolk, was a British Whig politician who sat in the House of Commons between 1719 and 1741.

== Early life ==
Plumer was the eldest surviving son of John Plumer, a wealthy London merchant of Blakesware, Hertfordshire, and his wife Mary Hale, daughter of William Hale of King's Walden, Hertfordshire. He had brothers Richard and William Plumer who were also in Parliament. He was educated at Eton College in 1698 and was admitted at Peterhouse, Cambridge on 26 April 1699, aged 16. In 1702, he was admitted at Gray's Inn. He married Elizabeth Hanbury, daughter of Thomas Hanbury of Kelmarsh, Northamptonshire. He succeeded to his father's estates in Berkshire, Essex and Middlesex in 1719. In 1722 he acquired the estate of Chediston Hall in Suffolk.

== Career ==
Plumer was elected with government support as Member of Parliament for Aldeburgh on 3 December 1719, after spending money liberally against the opposing interest of Lord Strafford. Soon after taking his seat he spoke in support of the Peerage Bill, and continued to support the Government for the rest of that Parliament. He was returned unopposed at the 1722 general election but subsequently spoke against the Government on the army estimates. In 1725 he was appointed to a committee drawing up the articles for the impeachment of Lord Macclesfield, and became one of the managers of the case.

Plumer lost the government interest for Aldeburgh and did not stand at the 1727 general election. Sackville Tufton, 7th Earl of Thanet brought him in as MP for Appleby at a by-election on 24 January 1730. He became one of the leading spokesmen of the opposition Whigs, and was actively engaged in securing the repeal of the salt duty in 1730 and in opposing its re-imposition in 1732. He was one of the more moderate members of his party and rather than insisting on the formal rejection of the excise bill, he felt their end had been met by the dropping of the bill, and thought Walpole had incurred mortification enough. In the ballot for a committee on frauds in the customs, he obtained more votes than any other opposition Member. He was returned again for Appleby at the 1734 general election. He supported the nonconformists and moved for the repeal of the Test Act in 1736 and made his last recorded speech on the subject in 1739. He retired from Parliament at the 1741 general election.

== Death and legacy ==
Plumer died without issue on 2 March 1746 and was buried at Eastwick, Hertfordshire. His estates passed to his brother William.

Parliament of Great Britain
| Preceded by Sir Henry Johnson; Samuel Lowe | Member of Parliament for Aldeburgh; 1719–1727; With: Samuel Lowe | Succeeded by William Windham; Samuel Lowe |
| Preceded by Sackville Tufton, 7th Earl of Thanet; John Ramsden | Member of Parliament for Appleby; 1730–1741; With: John Ramsden | Succeeded by George Dodington; John Ramsden |
