= John Tufton (cricketer) =

English cricketer and Member of Parliament

Personal information
- Full name: John Tufton
- Born: 23 November 1773; Hothfield, Kent, England
- Died: 27 May 1799 (aged 25); England
- Role: Batsman

Domestic team information
- Years: Team
- 1793–1798: Marylebone Cricket Club (MCC)
- Source: CricInfo, 22 March 2014

John Tufton (23 November 1773 – 27 May 1799) was an English cricketer and a Member of Parliament (MP). He was a member of the aristocratic Tufton family that produced the Earls of Thanet and related through his mother to the Sackville family that produced the Dukes of Dorset.

As a cricketer, Tufton is known to have been active from 1793 to 1798 and is recorded in 74 matches by CricketArchive, 48 of which are designated. He represented numerous teams but is mainly associated with Marylebone Cricket Club, of which he was an early member at Lord's Old Ground. Tufton's batting hand and bowling speed are unknown, though he was primarily a batsman who bowled occasionally, always underarm. He scored 1,049 known runs with a highest score of 61 and is credited with fourteen wickets including a best performance of four in one innings. (Note: Note that surviving match records to 1825 are incomplete and any statistical compilation of a player's career in that period is based on known data. Match scorecards were not always created, or have been lost, and the matches themselves were not always recorded in the press or other media. Scorecard data was not comprehensive: e.g., bowling analyses lacked balls bowled and runs conceded; bowlers were not credited with wickets when the batsman was caught or stumped; in many matches, the means of dismissal were omitted.)

Tufton was the MP for Appleby, Westmorland from 1796 until his death, aged 25, in 1799.

== Family ==
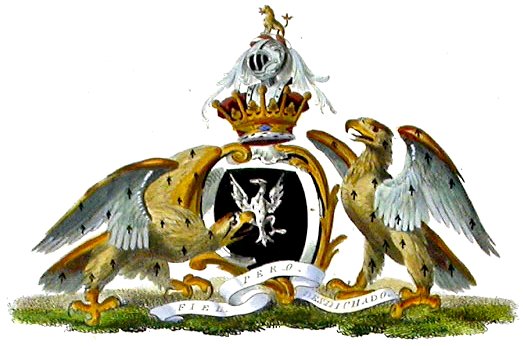
Arms of the Earls of Thanet

Styled the Honourable John Tufton, he belonged to an aristocratic family that was prominent in cricketing and other sporting circles. His parents were Sackville Tufton (1733–1786), the 8th Earl of Thanet, and Mary Sackville (1746–1778), who was the daughter of Lord John Philip Sackville and the sister of John Frederick Sackville, 3rd Duke of Dorset. Sackville and Dorset were famous patrons of Kent cricket. Tufton's younger brother was the Honourable Henry Tufton (1775–1849), later the 11th Earl of Thanet, who was also a noted amateur cricketer. If John Tufton had lived longer, he would have been the 11th Earl. He was educated at Westminster School and Jesus College, Cambridge.

There is a painting by Joshua Reynolds of John Tufton as a young child playing with his dog.

== Cricket ==
The earliest known record of Tufton in a cricket match is when he made his debut, aged nineteen, playing for Marylebone Cricket Club (MCC) against Kent at Dartford Brent on 27 and 28 June 1793. He scored one and nought and is not listed as a bowler.

Arthur Haygarth in Scores and Biographies says of Tufton that "his performances both as a batsman and as a bowler may be said to have been very good, if the early age at which he died is taken into consideration". Haygarth adds that Tufton was the first player ever to be recorded as being given out leg before wicket (lbw). This happened in a match at Moulsey Hurst in August 1795, when Tufton played in an "odds" match for England Thirteen versus Surrey. The bowler was John Wells. In his notes about that game, Haygarth says: "In this match, "leg before wicket" is found scored for the first time. In Britcher's printed score-book, Mr J. Tufton is in this match put down as bowled merely, and the leg before wicket added in a note. At first, when any one was got out in this way, it was marked down as simply bowled, and the leg before wicket omitted".

Tufton had his best season as a batsman in 1797 when he scored 428 runs including two half-centuries. In the match between MCC and a London XI at Lord's Old Ground 10 to 12 July, he scored 48 and 59 to help MCC win by 109 runs. His highest known career score of 61 was achieved at Itchin Stoke Down when MCC travelled to play Hampshire on 7 to 10 August. Tufton had scored 22 in the first innings and shared a significant partnership with Lord Frederick Beauclerk in the second when he scored 61 before being bowled out by Richard Purchase. MCC totalled 147 and 192, against 78 and 148 by Hampshire, to win by 113 runs.

Tufton's best performance as a bowler occurred 14 to 16 August 1797 in a match at Lord's Old Ground when he took six wickets for MCC in a return match against Hampshire, including four in the first innings which is his best known innings return. Hampshire batted first and were dismissed for 92 with four wickets falling to Tufton, three to Beauclerk, two catches (one by Tufton himself) and one stumping by his brother Henry. MCC replied with 114 and Tufton, listed at number five, made the top score of 39*. Hampshire were all out for 81 in the second innings, Tufton taking two more wickets, and MCC scored 60 for four to win by six wickets with Tufton again making top score (24*) to seal a matchwinning performance.

Tufton's final important match was on 16 and 17 August 1798 for England versus Surrey at Lord's Old Ground. He scored one and four and is not listed as a bowler.

Tufton's recorded career spanned the 1793 to 1798 seasons. He is credited by CricketArchive with 48 appearances in cricket and 26 appearances in other matches, but this is subject to the caveat that records of matches played prior to 1825 are incomplete. According to both ESPNcricinfo and CricketArchive, Tufton scored 1,049 known runs with a highest score of 61 and is credited with fourteen wickets including a best performance of four in one innings.

== Parliament ==
Tufton was elected at the 1796 general election as MP for the borough of Appleby in Westmorland, and held the seat until his death.

== Death and burial ==
Tufton was only 25 when he died soon after the 1799 English cricket season began. The details of his death, including the location, are unclear but he may have had tuberculosis. Haygarth says he had no monument and only a simple plaque on his coffin that stated:

The Honourable John Tufton,

Died 27th May, 1799,

In his 26th year.

He was buried in the family vault at Rainham Church in Kent.

== Sources ==
- Buckley, G. B. (1935). Fresh Light on 18th Century Cricket. Cotterell.
- Haygarth, Arthur (1862). Scores & Biographies, Volume 1 (1744–1826). Lillywhite.

Parliament of Great Britain
| Preceded by Hon. William Grimston; Hon. John Rawdon | Member of Parliament for Appleby; 1796 – 1799; With: John Courtenay | Succeeded by Robert Adair; John Courtenay |
