= William de Ireby =

13th century English noble

- Died: 1257
- Spouse(s): Christiana, daughter of Odard de Hodeholme
- Children: Christina de Ireby; Eva de Ireby
- Parents: Adam de Ireby (father); Juliana (mother)

William de Ireby (died 1257), Master of the Royal Hounds and Sheriff of Westmorland, was an English knight from Cumbria.

William was a younger son of Adam de Ireby and Juliana. He became one of King John of England’s household, as Master of the Royal Hounds. He obtained a grant of seisin of Nicholas de Stuteville's land in the valley of Liddel, during the First Barons' War, however this was not long in William's hands. He is known to be the Sheriff of Westmorland in 1230. William died in 1257.

== Marriage and issue ==
William married Christiana, daughter of Odard de Hodeholme, they are known to have had the following issue:

- Christina de Ireby, married, firstly, Thomas de Lascelles, secondly, Adam de Gesemuth and thirdly, Robert de Brus, Lord of Annandale.
- Eva Ireby
