= Mary Sackville (1746–1778) =

British noblewoman

- Lady Mary Sackville
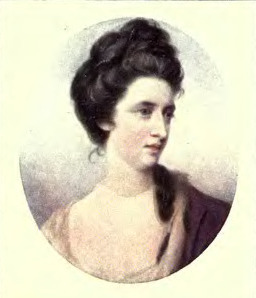
- Lady Mary Sackville
- Born: 1746
- Died: 30 September 1778 (aged 32)
- Husband: Sackville Tufton, 8th Earl of Thanet
- Issue: 7
- Father: Lord John Sackville
- Mother: Lady Frances Leveson-Gower

Mary Sackville (1746 – 30 September 1778) was a British noblewoman.

== Biography ==
Mary was the daughter of Lord John Sackville and Lady Frances Leveson-Gower. She married Sackville Tufton, 8th Earl of Thanet.

== Issue ==
She and her husband Sackville Tufton, 8th Earl of Thanet had seven children:

- Elizabeth Tufton (died 1768)
- Sackville Tufton, 9th Earl of Thanet
- Charles Tufton, 10th Earl of Thanet
- Caroline Tufton (born 1771), who married Joseph Foster Barham
- John Tufton, a noted cricketer
- Henry Tufton, 11th Earl of Thanet
- Edward William Tufton (1777–1786), who died by drowning
