= Joseph Foster Barham =

English politician, merchant and plantation owner

Joseph Foster Barham, the younger (1759 – 28 September 1832) was an English politician, merchant and plantation owner.

== Life ==
He was the son of Joseph Foster Barham I (formerly Joseph Foster) of Bedford and his wife Dorothea Vaughan. Thomas Foster Barham was his brother. Because he was brought up as a Moravian, the younger Joseph was barred from Eton and Oxford, so his parents sent him to a Moravian school in Germany.

In 1781, while travelling back from Jamaica to England, he was captured by an American privateer, and kept prisoner for several months, until he was finally released, and allowed to return home. He later converted to the Church of England, which then allowed him to pursue a political career.

== Mesopotamia and Island Estates ==
In 1779, young Joseph went to Jamaica to inspect his father's estates in Jamaica's western Westmoreland Parish, which he then managed for the next two years. He spent money renovating the great houses, but the estate's attorney, John Van Heilen, complained to the older Joseph that his son was not a prudent manager of the plantations.

In 1789 Foster Barham inherited his father's Mesopotamia estate in the Colony of Jamaica, including 299 slaves, and a partnership in the West Indian merchants Barham & Plummer with Thomas Plummer, Member for Ilchester.

In 1791, Foster Barham authorised the purchase of 61 slaves to bolster his workforce, and then another 30 in the next two years, to bolster his slave-force to 383. In 1810, Foster Barham's estates produced a record sugar crop. However, the conditions on the estates were poor, and the slave population declined to 298 in 1813, by which time Foster Barham's attorneys bought another 55 slaves from a neighbouring plantation.

In 1815 he withdrew from the partnership in favour of his brother and broke off dealings with the Atlantic slave trade, which had already been abolished in the British Empire eight years before. However, Foster Barham continued to make decisions concerning his estates. In 1818, he bought a small sugar estate named Springfield in Hanover Parish, and transferred the 112 slaves there to Mesopotamia. The Springfield slaves were transferred against their will, and many ran away to try to find their way back to Springfield. The estate's slave population reached a peak of 421, but the poor conditions there meant that deaths exceeded births at such a rapid rate that by the time the Slavery Abolition Act 1833 was passed, the number of slaves at Mesopotamia had fallen to 316.

When the Baptist War broke out in western Jamaica in 1831-2, Foster Barham's estates managed to avoid serious damage. His son, John, rewarded some slaves with tokens such as watches in appreciation of their loyalty.

== Political career ==
In 1793 Foster Barham bought one of the two seats at Stockbridge, a notorious rotten borough in Hampshire. He resigned the seat in 1799. He was then MP for Stockbridge again in 1802, sitting until 1806. He was subsequently MP for Okehampton (1806–07) and for a third time for Stockbridge (1807–22).

While Foster Barham supported the Slave Trade Act 1807, he supported the continuation of slavery in Jamaica, where his estates earned him a substantial annual income.

In a debate on an 1815 bill to abolish slavery, he stated that British capital upheld the Spanish slave trade, half of the Danish, and part of the Portuguese. Foster Barham continually opposed the emancipation of the slaves, and supported the sugar interests in Jamaica.

== Personal life and death ==
Foster Barham married Lady Caroline Tufton, daughter of Sackville Tufton, 8th Earl of Thanet and Mary Sackville. They had three sons and two daughters:

- John Foster Barham, eldest son, MP for Stockbridge; certified as of unsound mind in 1837, and died 1838. He married Lady Katherine Grimston, daughter of James Grimston, 1st Earl of Verulam. His eldest son, John Foster Barham, inherited the Mesopotamia estate. John closed the Moravian mission there, and showed little interest in the estate, except in terms of how much compensation he was due to receive. John valued his slaves at £43 each, and claimed a total of over £13,000, but the Commissioner of Compensation awarded him a smaller figure of less than £6,000. In 1836, John was put under medical superintendence, and a year later he was certified as being of "unsound mind". He married Lady Katherine Grimston, but they had no children.
- Charles Henry Barham (1808-1878), JP (Pembroke), MP for Appleby
- William.
- Caroline Gertrude married Sanderson Robins.
- Mary.

Foster Barham sold his Stockbridge borough seat to Earl Grosvenor in the early 1820s. He died on 28 September 1832 near Bedford, at the house of his sister Mary Livius. He was 72 when he died. Foster Barham's total Jamaican estate, exclusive of land and buildings, was valued at over £41,000.

== Works ==
- Considerations on the late Act for continuing the prohibition of corn in the distillery (1810)
- Considerations on the abolition of Negro slavery, and the means of practically effecting it (1823). Foster Barham was an abolitionist in principle, though his views were hedged with caveats. His abolitionist views did not extend to freeing the slaves on his own estates, and he argued that the slaves were unfit for freedom and needed "moral improvement". He produced plans for introducing Asian labour to run Caribbean plantations (as did William Layman and Robert Townsend Farquhar); and they circulated in government. He also gave an estimate of the cost of raising a plantation slave, lower than that of George Hibbert.
