= Sir John Ramsden, 3rd Baronet =

British landowner and Independent Whig politician

Sir John Ramsden, 3rd Baronet (1699–1769), of Byram and Longley Hall, Yorkshire, was a British landowner and Independent Whig politician who sat in the House of Commons from 1727 to 1754.

== Early life ==
Ramsden was baptised on 21 March 1699, the eldest son of Sir William Ramsden, 2nd Baronet, of Byram and Longley Hall, and his wife Elizabeth Lowther, daughter of John Lowther, 1st Viscount Lonsdale. He was admitted to Clare College, Cambridge on 4 April 1718. He succeeded his father in the baronetcy on 27 June 1736.

== Career ==
At the 1727 British general election, Ramsden was returned as Member of Parliament for Appleby by his uncle, Henry Lowther, 3rd Viscount Lonsdale. He was an independent Whig and voted with the government in 1729 on the civil list arrears, in 1733 on the Excise Bill, and in 1734 on the repeal of the Septennial Act. He was returned at the 1734 British general election and voted against the government on the Spanish convention in 1739. He was considered an opposition member in 1740. Ramsden was returned again at the 1741 British general election and was put forward, though not elected, for the secret committee on Walpole in 1742. However, he voted against the government on the Hanoverians in the following December and again in 1744. He was returned at the 1747 British general election and was classed as a government supporter, although he remained independent. He did not stand again in the 1754.

== Later life and legacy ==
Ramsden married, by licence dated 8 August 1748, Margaret Bright, widow of Thomas Liddell Bright of Badsworth, Yorkshire, and daughter of William Norton of Sawley, Yorkshire. They had two sons and two daughters. In 1766, he was responsible for the building of the Cloth Hall at Huddersfield. He died at Byram on 10 April 1769 and was buried at Brotherton on 17 April. He was succeeded by his son, John.

== See also ==
- Ramsden baronets
- Ramsden Estate

Parliament of Great Britain
Preceded by Sackville Tufton; James Lowther	Member of Parliament for Appleby; 1727–1754; With: Sackville Tufton 1727-1730; Walter Plumer 1730-1741; George Dodington 1741-1742; Sir Charles Wyndham, Bt 1742-1747; Randle Wilbraham 1747-1754	Succeeded by William Lee; Philip Honywood
Baronetage of England
Preceded by William Ramsden	Baronet (of Byram); 1736-1769	Succeeded by John Ramsden
