= Henry Tufton, 1st Baron Hothfield =

British peer, Liberal politician and owner and breeder of racehorses

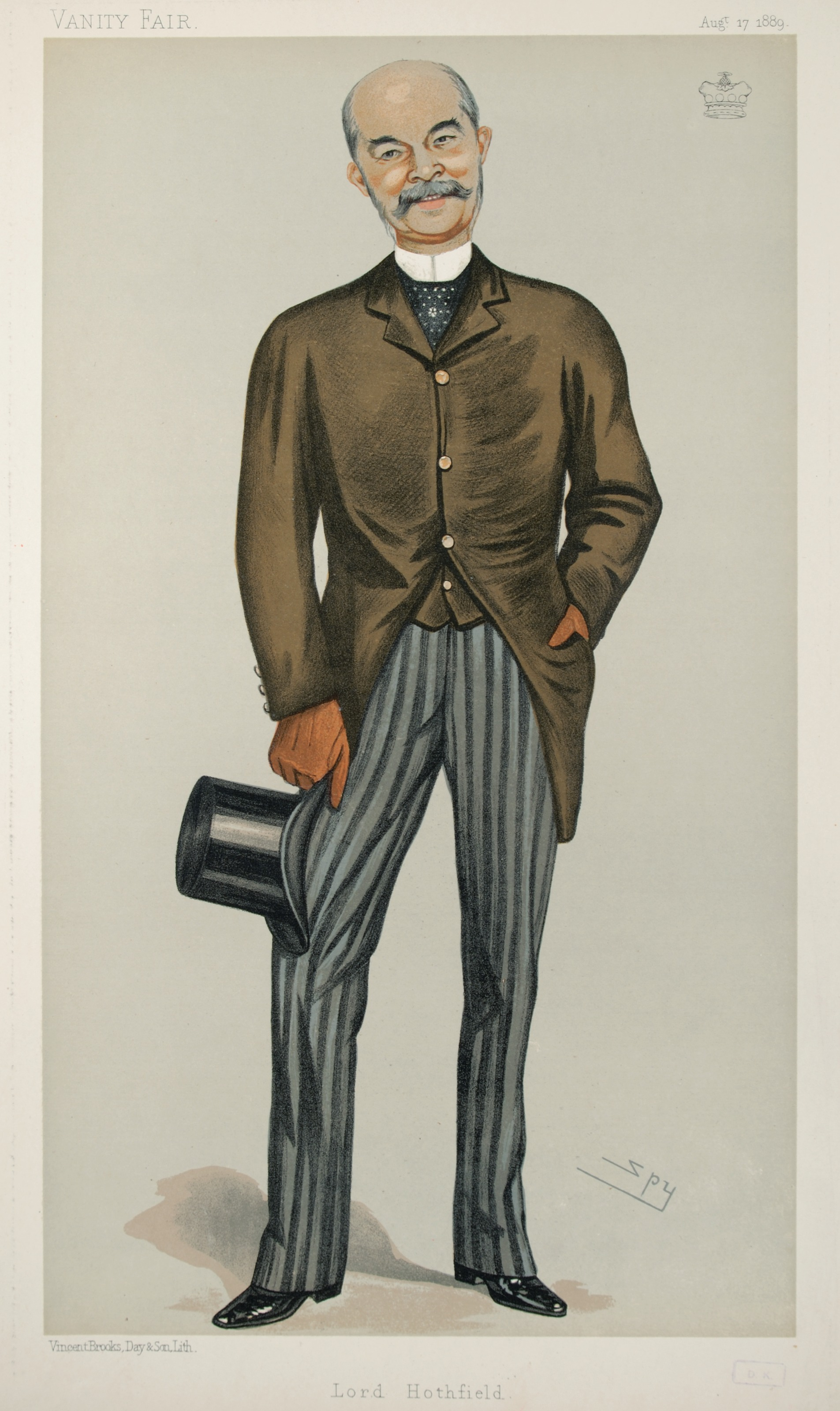
Lord Hothfield as caricatured by Spy (Leslie Ward) in Vanity Fair, August 1889

Henry James Tufton, 1st Baron Hothfield (4 June 1844 – 29 October 1926), known as Sir Henry James Tufton, 2nd Baronet, from 1871 to 1881, was a British peer, Liberal politician and owner and breeder of racehorses.

== Biography ==
Hothfield was the son of Sir Richard Tufton, 1st Baronet, and his wife Adelaide Amelie Lacour. His father was the reputed natural son of Henry Tufton, 11th and last Earl of Thanet, and had succeeded to the Tufton estates on the death of the Earl in 1849. Hothfield succeeded his father as second Baronet in 1871 and in 1881 he was raised to the peerage as Baron Hothfield, of Hothfield in the County of Kent. The same year he was appointed Lord Lieutenant of Westmorland, a post he held until 1926. He stood for election for the Liberal party in the 1880 general election in Westmorland. In 1886, he also served briefly as a Lord-in-waiting (government whip in the House of Lords) in the Liberal administration of William Ewart Gladstone. He was also a prominent breeder and owner of racehorses.

== Family ==
Tufton married in 1872 Alice Harriet Argyll Stracey (d. 1914), daughter of Reverend William James Stracy-Clitherow. They had children, three sons and a daughter:

- John Sackville Richard Tufton, 2nd Baron Hothfield (1873–1952); who was father of the third Baron.
- Hon. Sackville Philip Tufton (b.1875); whose son succeeded as fourth Baron.
- Hon. Rosamund Tufton (b.1877); married in 1907 Stuart Anderson.
- Hon. Charles Henry Tufton (1879-1923); married in 1903 Stella Josephine Faudel-Phillips, daughter of Sir George Faudel-Phillips, 1st Baronet; whose son succeeded as fifth Baron, and is father of the current Baron.

Lord Hothfield died in October 1926, aged 82, and was succeeded in his titles by his eldest son John. Lady Hothfield died in 1914.

== Arms ==
Coat of arms of Henry Tufton, 1st Baron Hothfield
Crest A Sea Lion sejant Argent debruised by a Bendlet wavy Sable. Escutcheon Sable an Eagle displayed Ermine within a Bordure wavy Or. Supporters On either side an Eagle Ermine gorged with a Collar Gules pendent therefrom an Escutcheon of the Arms of Tufton. Motto Ales Volat Propriis (The bird flies to its own)

== See also ==
- Earl of Thanet

Honorary titles
Preceded by Sir Richard Musgrave	Lord Lieutenant of Westmorland; 1881–1926	Succeeded by Lord Henry Cavendish-Bentinck
Peerage of the United Kingdom
New creation	Baron Hothfield; 1881–1926	Succeeded by John Sackville Richard Tufton
Baronetage of the United Kingdom
Preceded by Richard Tufton	Baronet (of Appleby); 1871–1926	Succeeded by John Sackville Richard Tufton
