= 1799 English cricket season =

Cricket season review

Surrey defeated England three times in the 1799 English cricket season. As in the previous year, the number of matches may have declined due to the impact of the Napoleonic War. Fewer were reported, but there was loose censorship in place. Details of ten matches are known, but few were historically important. (Note: Any match listed in the ACS' Important Match Guide (1981) is historically important, and therefore of the highest standard, whether or not a scorecard might exist. The same applies to numerous matches discovered by researchers since 1981. For further information, see First-class cricket.)

The earliest known mention of cricket in Devon has been found. A cricket club was formed at Seringapatam in south India after the successful British siege.

== England v Surrey ==
England played against Surrey three times in 1799, and all three games ended in convincing wins by Surrey. All the matches were played on Lord's Old Ground between 30 July and 17 August. Surrey's margins of victory were 8 wickets, 143 runs, and an innings & 117 runs. These were the season's only important matches.

== Other events ==
Cricket in the county of Devon was first referenced in 1799.

Following the siege of Seringapatam in south India, a cricket club was established there.

There were two matches in June between Montpelier and a combined Brentford/Richmond team. Montpelier won both games, by 91 runs at home, and by 148 runs away.

MCC played two matches in June against its own Thursday Club, many of whose members were Middlesex players. The Thursday Club won the first by 54 runs, and MCC the second by 41 runs.

Middlesex played Waltham & Hertfordshire twice in September. The first match at Waltham Abbey was drawn. Middlesex won the second on Lord's Old Ground by 3 runs.

== Bibliography ==
- ACS (1981). A Guide to Important Cricket Matches Played in the British Isles 1709–1863. Nottingham: ACS. OCLC 85045528.
- Bowen, Rowland (1970). Cricket: A History of its Growth and Development. London: Eyre & Spottiswoode. ISBN 978-04-13278-60-9.
- Buckley, G. B. (1935). Fresh Light on 18th Century Cricket. Birmingham: Cotterell & Co. OCLC 23450280.
- Haygarth, Arthur (1996) [1862]. Scores & Biographies, Volume 1 (1744–1826). Kennington: Frederick Lillywhite. ISBN 978-19-00592-23-9.
- Waghorn, H. T. (2005) [1906]. The Dawn of Cricket. London: J. W. McKenzie. ISBN 978-09-47821-17-3.
- Warner, Pelham (1946). Lords: 1787–1945. London: Harrap. OCLC 877106024.
