= Sackville Tufton, 8th Earl of Thanet =

English nobleman

Sackville Tufton, 8th Earl of Thanet (Lord Thanet) (1733–1786) was an English nobleman.

== Life ==
He was the second son of Sackville Tufton, 7th Earl of Thanet. Tufton received his early education at Westminster School. He was hereditary High Sheriff of Westmorland from 1753 to 1786.

== Family ==
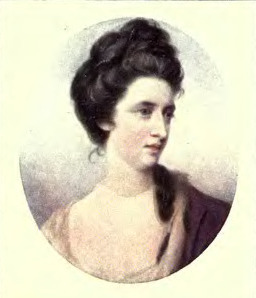
Mary Sackville, portrait by Ozias Humphry

Tufton married Mary Sackville, daughter of Lord John Sackville, in 1767. They had five sons and two daughters:

- Elizabeth (died 1768)
- Sackville Tufton, 9th Earl of Thanet
- Charles Tufton, 10th Earl of Thanet
- Caroline (born 1771), who married Joseph Foster Barham
- John Tufton, a noted cricketer
- Henry Tufton, 11th Earl of Thanet
- Edward William (1777–1786), who died by drowning.

== Arms ==
Coat of arms of Sackville Tufton, 8th Earl of Thanet
Coronet A Coronet of an Earl Crest A Sea Lion sejant Argent. Escutcheon Sable an Eagle displayed Ermine within a Bordure Argent. Supporters On either side an Eagle Ermine. Motto Ales Volat Propriis (The bird flies to its own)

Peerage of England
Preceded by Sackville Tufton	Earl of Thanet; 1753–1786	Succeeded by Sackville Tufton
