= Lord John Sackville =

English cricketer (1713–1765)

John Philip Sackville
- Born: 22 June 1713
- Died: 3 December 1765 (aged 52); Tour du Pain, Switzerland
- Father: Lionel Sackville

Lord John Philip Sackville (22 June 1713 – 3 December 1765) was the second son of Lionel Sackville, 1st Duke of Dorset. He was a keen cricketer who was closely connected with the sport in Kent.

He was Member of Parliament (MP) for Tamworth from 1734 to 1747.

== Cricket career ==
Sackville was first recorded as a cricketer in 1734 when he and his brother, Lord Middlesex, played for Kent against Sussex at Sevenoaks Vine.

On 20 August 1735, Sackville again captained Kent to victory against Sir William Gage's Sussex at Sevenoaks Vine. Shortly afterwards, the London Evening Post speculated that "the Conqueror" (i.e., a decider) between the Kent and Sussex teams would be played in a few days, but there is no record of a further match.

Sackville became the main patron of the Kent team and captained the side in many matches until 1745 at least, but he is not mentioned in the sources after that.

In 1739, Sackville played for London Cricket Club which was having selection problems at the time.

In the 1744 English cricket season, Lord John challenged an All-England side to play against his Kent team and Kent won the game with one wicket to spare, largely thanks to Sackville himself taking a memorable catch to dismiss Richard Newland. The match details were recorded and preserved in what is now cricket's second oldest known scorecard.

In 1745, Sackville wrote a letter to the Duke of Richmond after Sussex had lost to Surrey and said: "I wish you had let Ridgeway play instead of your stopper behind it might have turned the match in our favour". Evidently, Sackville had wagered on Sussex to win.

== Family and personal life ==
Sackville was a notorious rake in his youth. He was compelled to marry Lady Frances Leveson-Gower, daughter of John Leveson-Gower, 1st Earl Gower and sister of the Duchess of Bedford in 1744, after she gave birth to his child at Woburn. They eventually had two sons and one daughter. The couple's parents were furious, and the Prince of Wales compensated Sackville for any loss of income, making him a lord of his bedchamber in 1745, and thus securing him as a recruit to his party.

Two of Sackville's children were:

- John Frederick Sackville, 3rd Duke of Dorset (25 March 1745 – 19 July 1799).
- Mary Sackville (b. 1 April 1746). Married Sackville Tufton, 8th Earl of Thanet in 1767.

John Frederick, later the 3rd Duke of Dorset, became a member of the Hambledon Club, and a leading supporter of cricket in the latter half of the eighteenth century. Sackville's son-in-law, the 8th Earl of Thanet, was an early member of the Marylebone Cricket Club. His grandsons John Tufton and Henry Tufton were noted amateur players at the end of the 18th century.

Sackville was also disappointed when Lord Wilmington the late Prime Minister (d. 1743) declined to leave him his Sussex estates, worth £3-£4,000 a year. It is not clear if Wilmington's decision was made because of Sackville's messy private life, or his political inconstancy. Commissioned a captain in the 37th Regiment of Foot in 1734, he became a captain and lieutenant-colonel in the 2nd Regiment of Foot Guards on 1 May 1740. He disgraced himself by deserting from the Guards when they were sent on foreign service in 1746, and was forced to leave the Army in September. Finally, he was committed to a private lunatic asylum circa 1746, then sent abroad to exile on a very small allowance in Lausanne where Lord Shelburne met him in 1760, and commented on his dirty condition but lucid conversation.

According to his descendant Robert Sackville-West, 7th Baron Sackville in his book Inheritance he became insane later in life, dying in Geneva, Switzerland, aged 52. However, his brother lived long enough to allow John Philip's son to inherit his title and become the next Duke of Dorset.

== Bibliography ==
- Buckley, G. B. (1935). Fresh Light on 18th Century Cricket. Birmingham: Cotterell & Co. OCLC 23450280.
- Haygarth, Arthur (1996) [1862]. Scores & Biographies, Volume 1 (1744–1826). Kennington: Frederick Lillywhite. ISBN 978-19-00592-23-9.
- McCann, Tim (2004). Sussex Cricket in the Eighteenth Century (PDF). Vol. 88. Lewes: West Sussex Record Office. ISBN 978-08-54450-55-8.
- Waghorn, H. T. (1899). Cricket Scores, Notes, &c. From 1730–1773. Edinburgh: Blackwood. OCLC 1086375331.

Parliament of Great Britain
Preceded by Hon. Thomas Willoughby; William O'Brien, 4th Earl of Inchiquin	Member of Parliament for Tamworth; 1734 – 1747; With: Hon. George Compton 1734–35; Charles Cotes 1735–41; John Floyer 1741–42; Charles Cotes 1742–47	Succeeded by Henry Harpur; Hon. Thomas Villiers
