= Sackville Tufton, 7th Earl of Thanet =

English Tory politician

Coat of arms of Sackville Tufton, 7th Earl of Thanet
Coronet A Coronet of an Earl Crest A Sea Lion sejant Argent. Escutcheon Sable an Eagle displayed Ermine within a Bordure Argent. Supporters On either side an Eagle Ermine. Motto Ales Volat Propriis (The bird flies to its own)

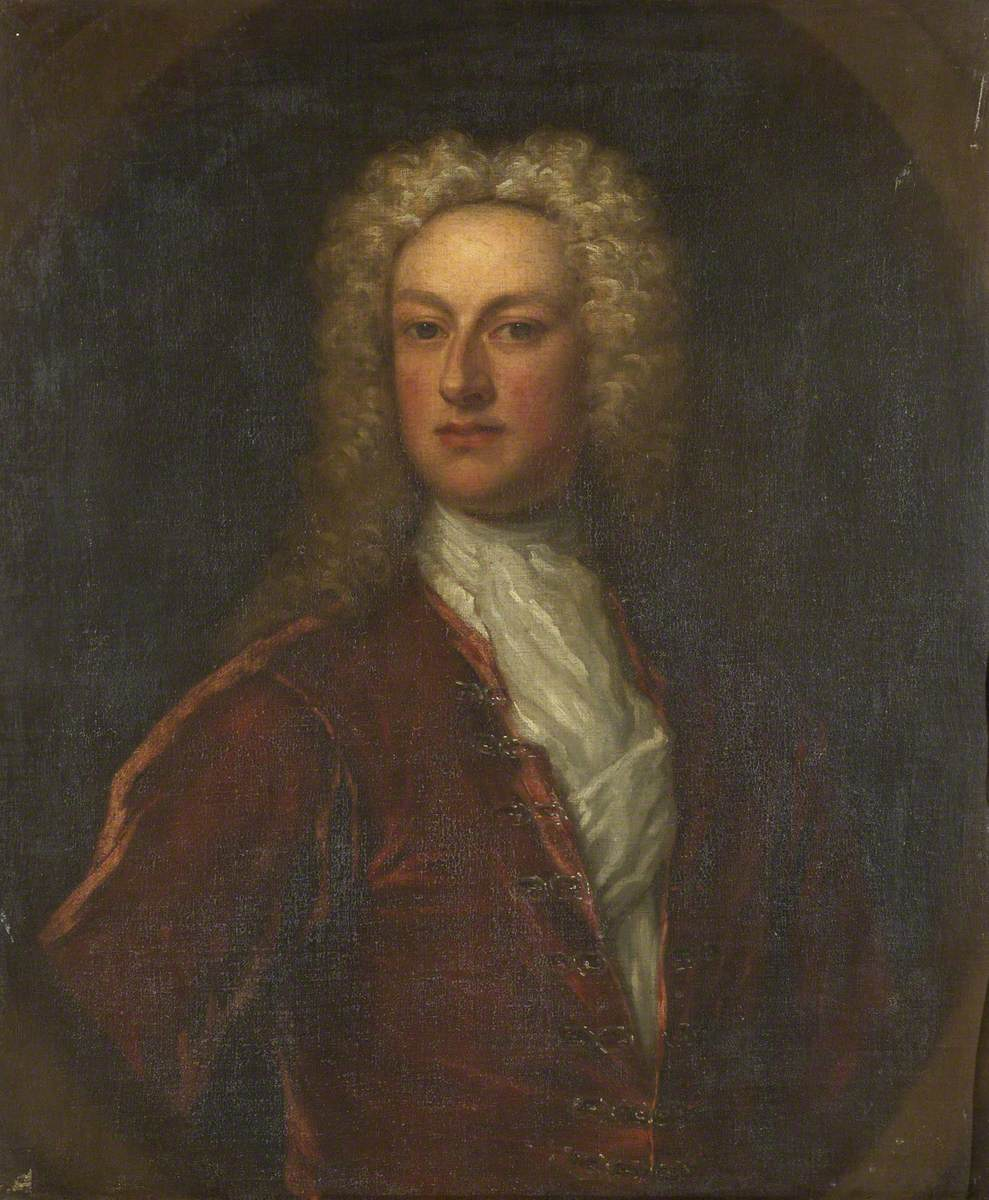
Portrait of Thanet by Joseph Highmore

Sackville Tufton, 7th Earl of Thanet (11 May 1688 – 4 December 1753) was an English Tory politician who sat in the House of Commons from 1722 until 1729 when he succeeded to the peerage as Earl of Thanet.

Tufton was the son of Colonel the Honourable Sackville Tufton, fifth son of John Tufton, 2nd Earl of Thanet. His mother was Elizabeth, daughter of Ralph Wilbraham of Newbottle. He succeeded his father in 1721 and married Lady Mary Saville, daughter of William Savile, 2nd Marquess of Halifax, on 11 June 1722.

Tufton was returned unopposed as Tory Member of Parliament for Appleby at the 1722 British general election. In 1725 he made an agreement with the 3rd Viscount Lonsdale while they were both alive, that each would recommend one Member for Appleby and not attempt to change the balance of power in the borough. Accordingly, he was returned unopposed again at the 1727 British general election. His only recorded vote in the Commons was against the Government on the civil list arrears in 1729. He vacated his seat in the Commons when he succeeded his uncle Thomas Tufton, 6th Earl of Thanet in the earldom of Thanet and entered the House of Lords. He was hereditary High Sheriff of Westmorland from 1729 to 1753.

Thanet's wife Mary died in July 1751. He survived her by two years and died in December 1753, aged 65. He was succeeded in his titles by his eldest surviving son, Sackville. His daughter Mary married Sir William Duncan, 1st Baronet, a royal physician, and his other daughter Charlotte died unmarried.

Parliament of Great Britain
Preceded by Thomas Lutwyche; Sir Richard Sandford, Bt	Member of Parliament for Appleby; 1722–1729; With: Sir Richard Sandford, Bt 1722–23; James Lowther 1723–27; Sir John Ramsden, Bt 1727–29	Succeeded by Sir John Ramsden, Bt; Walter Plumer
Peerage of England
Preceded by Thomas Tufton	Earl of Thanet; 1729–1753	Succeeded by Sackville Tufton
