= Anthony Lowther (died 1693) =

English politician

Anthony Lowther, FRS (c. 1641 – 27 January 1693) was an English landowner, of Marske-by-the-Sea, Yorkshire and Member of Parliament.

He was the eldest son of draper Robert Lowther (died 1655), an alderman of London and his second wife Elizabeth. Robert's brother was Sir John Lowther of Lowther. In 1649, he and his nephew, Sir John Lowther, 1st Baronet, of Lowther, MP for Westmorland, bought Marske-by-the-Sea for £13,000 and developed the alum deposits there.

He was one of the original Fellows of the Royal Society, from its chartered inception in 1663.

He was elected member of parliament for Appleby in March and October 1679.

He died in 1693 and was buried at Walthamstow. In February 1667, he had married Margaret Penn, daughter of Sir William Penn, and had one son, Sir William Lowther, 1st Baronet (1670–1705), who was created a baronet in 1697 and became MP for Lancaster in 1702.

Parliament of England
Preceded by John Dalston; Thomas Tufton	Member of Parliament for Appleby; 1679–1681; With: Richard Tufton 1679–1681; Sackville Tufton 1681	Succeeded by Sackville Tufton; Sir John Bland
