= Charles Tufton, 10th Earl of Thanet =

English Earl

Charles Tufton, 10th Earl of Thanet (10 September 1770 – 20 April 1832) was an English nobleman.

Charles was the second-born son of Sackville Tufton, 8th Earl of Thanet and his wife Mary Sackville.

He became Earl of Thanet on 24 January 1825, on the death of his elder brother Sackville Tufton, 9th Earl of Thanet. He was hereditary High Sheriff of Westmorland from 1825 to 1832.

He died 20 April 1832, aged 61. The title passed to his brother Henry Tufton, 11th Earl of Thanet

== Arms ==
Coat of arms of Charles Tufton, 10th Earl of Thanet
| Coronet A Coronet of an Earl Crest A Sea Lion sejant Argent. Escutcheon Sable an Eagle displayed Ermine within a Bordure Argent. Supporters On either side an Eagle Ermine. Motto Ales Volat Propriis (The bird flies to its own) |

Peerage of England
| Preceded by Sackville Tufton | Earl of Thanet; 1825–1832 | Succeeded by Henry Tufton |
