= Sackville Tufton =

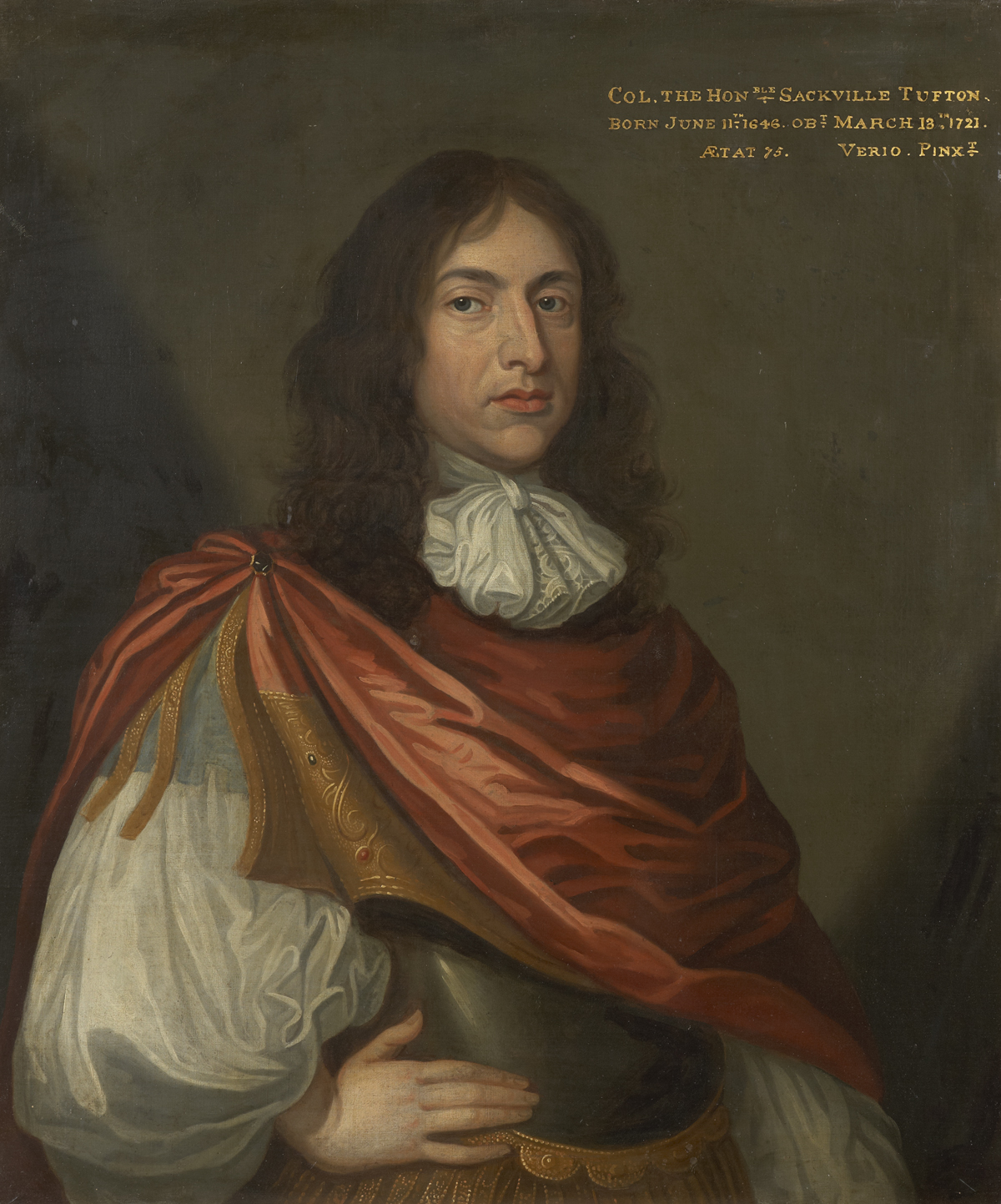
Colonel the Honourable Sackville Tufton (1646–1721) by Antonio Verrio

Colonel Sackville Tufton (11 June 1646 – 30 March 1721) was the son of John Tufton, 2nd Earl of Thanet and his second wife Margaret Sackville. He married Elizabeth, daughter of Ralph Wilbraham of Newbottle, Northumberland. They had twelve children:

- John Tufton (25 May 1687 – 23 February 1689)
- Sackville Tufton, 7th Earl of Thanet (1688–1753)
- John Tufton (d. 12 September 1727)
- Wilbraham Tufton (d. 20 October 1754)
- Thomas Tufton (d. 9 December 1733)
- Richard Tufton
- Catharine Tufton (d. 27 June 1731)
- Elizabeth Tufton (d. 19 June 1746)
- Margaret Tufton (d. 24 July 1758)
- Christian Tufton (d. 10 October 1746)
- Mary Tufton (d. 19 April 1785)
- Elizabeth Tufton (died an infant)

Tufton was an officer in the 1st Foot Guards. In 1673, he was wounded in the Battle of Schooneveld against the Dutch fleet. His right hand was shattered with muscles and tendons lacerated and bones broken. Recovery was slow and painful and he required several surgical operations to remove bone fragments, performed without the benefit of anaesthesia. He recuperated in Bath in the following spring where he was treated by Dr Robert Peirce. He returned to Bath over several years for further treatment under Peirce's direction and regained some use of his hand.

In 1687, he was appointed colonel of a regiment of foot, which later became the East Yorkshire Regiment. He was removed from his colonelcy at the end of 1688 for refusing to swear loyalty to William III after the Glorious Revolution.

Parliament of England
Preceded by Hon. Richard Tufton; Anthony Lowther	Member of Parliament for Appleby; 1681–1689; With: Anthony Lowther 1681; Sir John Bland, Bt 1681–1685; Philip Musgrave 1685–1689	Succeeded by Philip Musgrave; Richard Lowther
Military offices
Preceded by The Earl of Thanet	Governor of Gravesend and Tilbury; 1684–1689	Succeeded by William Selwyn
Preceded by Arthur Herbert	Colonel of Sackville Tufton's Regiment of Foot; 1687–1688	Succeeded by Sir James Leslie
