= John Tufton, 4th Earl of Thanet =

English politician and nobleman

John Tufton, 4th Earl of Thanet (7 August 1638 – 27 April 1680), styled The Honourable John Tufton until 1679, was an English politician and nobleman.

Tufton was the second son of John Tufton, 2nd Earl of Thanet, by Lady Margaret, daughter of Richard Sackville, 3rd Earl of Dorset and Lady Anne Clifford. Through his father, he was a great-great-grandson of William Cecil, 1st Baron Burghley.

He was educated at Eton and Queen's College, Oxford. He succeeded his elder brother Nicholas Tufton, 3rd Earl of Thanet in the earldom and entered the House of Lords in November 1679.

Lord Thanet died unmarried in April 1680, aged 41. He was succeeded in the earldom by his younger brother, Richard.

He was also the hereditary High Sheriff of Westmorland from 1679 to 1680.

Coat of arms of John Tufton, 4th Earl of Thanet
Coronet A Coronet of an Earl Crest A Sea Lion sejant Argent. Escutcheon Sable an Eagle displayed Ermine within a Bordure Argent. Supporters On either side an Eagle Ermine. Motto Ales Volat Propriis (The bird flies to its own)

Peerage of England
Preceded by Nicholas Tufton	Earl of Thanet; 1679–1680	Succeeded by Richard Tufton
