= Richard Tufton, 5th Earl of Thanet =

English nobleman

Coat of arms of Richard Tufton, 5th Earl of Thanet
Coronet A Coronet of an Earl Crest A Sea Lion sejant Argent. Escutcheon Sable an Eagle displayed Ermine within a Bordure Argent. Supporters On either side an Eagle Ermine. Motto Ales Volat Propriis (The bird flies to its own)

Richard Tufton, 5th Earl of Thanet (30 May 1640 or 1641 – 8 March 1684), styled The Honourable Richard Tufton until 1680, was an English nobleman.

Tufton was the third son of John Tufton, 2nd Earl of Thanet and Lady Margaret, daughter of Richard Sackville, 3rd Earl of Dorset and Lady Anne Clifford. Through his father, he was a great-great-grandson of Lord Burghley. He sat as Member of Parliament for Appleby from 1679 to 1680, when he succeeded his elder brother John Tufton, 4th Earl of Thanet in the earldom and entered the House of Lords. He also inherited the office of High Sheriff of Westmorland (1680–1684).

Lord Thanet died unmarried in March 1684 and was succeeded in his titles by his younger brother, Thomas.

Parliament of England
Preceded by Hon. Thomas Tufton; John Dalston	Member of Parliament for Appleby; 1679–1680; With: Anthony Lowther	Succeeded by Anthony Lowther; Hon. Sackville Tufton
Military offices
Preceded by Sir Francis Leke, Bt	Governor of Gravesend and Tilbury; 1669–1681	Succeeded by Hon. Sackville Tufton
Peerage of England
Preceded by John Tufton	Earl of Thanet; 1680–1684	Succeeded by Thomas Tufton
