= John Tufton, 2nd Baron Hothfield =

British Army officer, farmer, landowner, and cricketer

John Tufton
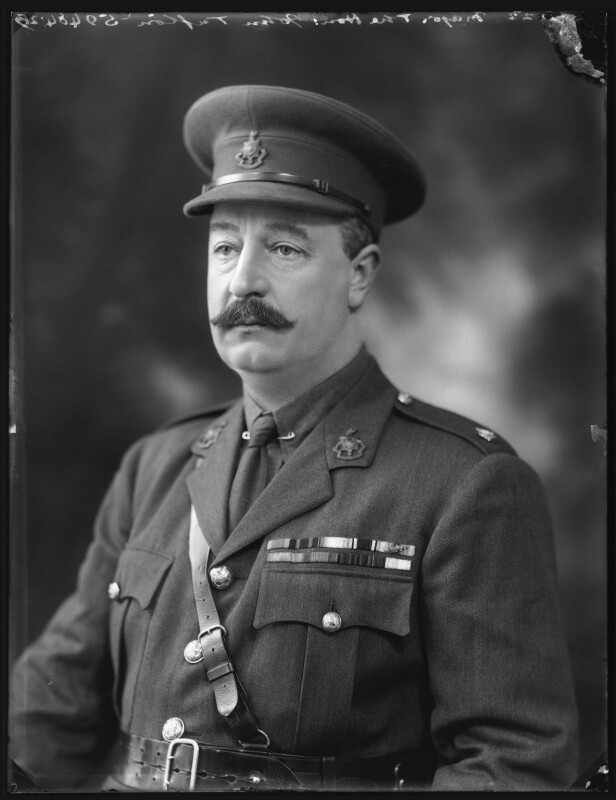
- Tufton photographed in 1922 by Bassano Ltd.
- Born: 8 November 1873; Hothfield Place, Ashford, Kent
- Died: 21 December 1962 (aged 89); Bayswater, London
- Relatives: Henry Tufton, 1st Baron Hothfield (father)
- Military career
- Allegiance: United Kingdom
- Branch: British Army
- Service years: 1893–1896; 1900–1925
- Rank: Major
- Units: 3rd Battalion, Royal Sussex Regiment (1892–1894); 1st Life Guards (1894–1896); 3rd Battalion, Royal Sussex Regiment (1900–1925); 6th Division (1915–1919)
- Conflicts: Second Boer War; Western Front (World War I)
- Awards: Queen's South Africa Medal; Distinguished Service Order; Ordre de Léopold; Order of Agricultural Merit

Major John Sackville Richard Tufton, 2nd Baron Hothfield, DSO (8 November 1873 – 21 December 1952) was a British Army officer, farmer and land owner who played first-class cricket for Kent County Cricket Club. He served during the Second Boer War and First World War and succeeded to his title as the 2nd Baron Hothfield in 1926.

== Early life ==
Tufton was born in November 1873 at Hothfield Place near Ashford in Kent. He was the eldest son of Henry Tufton, 1st Baron Hothfield and his wife Alice and was educated at Eton College between 1887 and 1892. He did not play cricket in the school XI but was a keen sportsman and came from a family with a "strong cricketing tradition" stretching back 150 years, his father having been President of Kent County Cricket Club in 1877.

== Army career ==
On leaving school in 1892, Tufton was commissioned as a second lieutenant in the 3rd Battalion of The Royal Sussex Regiment, a militia unit. He was promoted to lieutenant in 1893 before applying to join the regular army in 1894, reverting to the rank of second lieutenant in the 1st Life Guards. He resigned his commission in 1896.

Tufton rejoined the Royal Sussex Regiment as a lieutenant in March 1900 during the Second Boer War, the first in which militia regiments were allowed to fight overseas. He was promoted to captain on 18 August 1900 and saw active service in South Africa in reserve positions in Orange Free State and Transvaal. For his service in the war, he was awarded the Queen's South Africa Medal with five clasps. He moved with the battalion to Saint Helena to guard prisoners of war before returning to the Southampton on the SS Dominion in September 1902.

Following the war, the 3rd Royal Sussex became a reserve battalion in 1908 and Tufton was appointed Major, serving at the battalion's depot at Chichester. At the outbreak of the First World War he volunteered for active service, moving with the battalion to Dover initially and then to France in February 1915 where he was appointed Assistant Provost Marshal (APM) attached to 6th Division headquarters with the rank of major. He served throughout the war, the division seeing action on the Western Front from the Second Battle of Ypres in 1915 through to the Hundred Days Offensive and attacks on the Hindenburg Line in 1918. He was mentioned in dispatches and awarded the Distinguished Service Order (DSO) in the 1916 New Year Honours and received the Ordre de Léopold in 1918.

The division saw service in the army of occupation following the Armistice with Germany and Tufton continued to serve as APM until April 1919 and was again mentioned in dispatches in July. He was awarded the Order of Agricultural Merit by the French government before reverting to the Reserve of Officers.

Tufton was called back into service briefly during the 1921 threat of a General Strike but the army was not required to take action and he again reverted to the reserve. He relinquished his commission in 1925 after reaching the maximum age (50) for service in the reserve.

== Cricket ==
John Tufton, 2nd Baron Hothfield
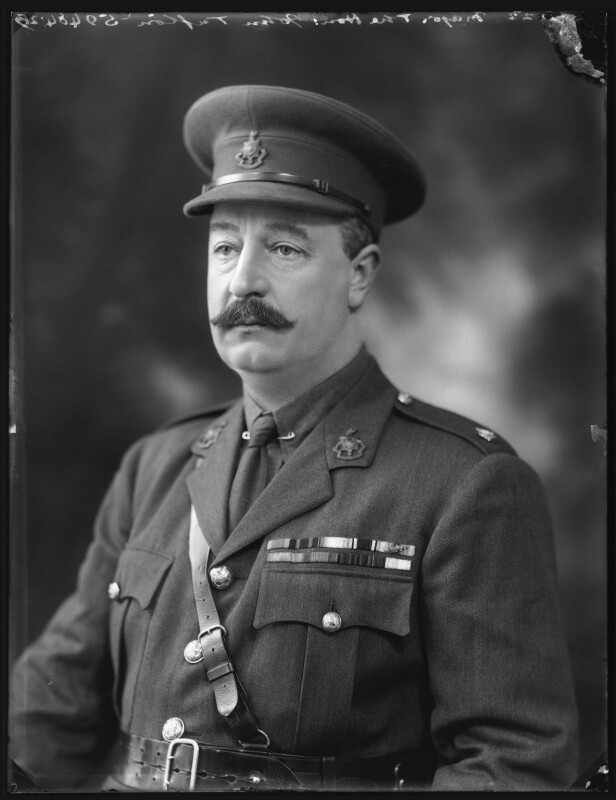

Cricket information
- Batting: Right-handed
- Bowling: Right-arm medium

Domestic team information
- Years: Team
- 1897–1898: Kent
- FC debut: 31 May 1897 Marylebone Cricket Club (MCC) v Leicestershire
- Last FC: 15 May 1899 MCC v Leicestershire

Career statistics
Competition	First-class
Matches	13
Runs scored	243
Batting average	14.29
100s/50s	0/0
Top score	33*
Catches/stumpings	5/–
- Source: CricInfo, 30 July 2020

Tufton played in 13 first-class cricket matches in the years after he first left the army between 1897 and 1899. He was on the General Committee at Kent County Cricket Club between 1897 and 1909 and then again in 1914 and played club cricket regularly. He made his first-class debut for Marylebone Cricket Club (MCC) against Leicestershire at Lord's in May 1897 before playing in six first-class matches for Kent during the same season. Two matches for both MCC and Kent in 1898 were followed by another two for MCC in 1899, another appearance against Leicestershire marking the end of his first-class career.

He continued to play club cricket until the 1914 season including Free Foresters, I Zingari and Band of Brothers, closely associated with Kent. He resigned his position on the Kent Committee at the start of the First World War as he opposed Lord Harris' position on continuing to play top-class cricket during the war.

== Family life ==
As well as playing cricket, Tufton was a keen lawn tennis player, considered one of the best in the House of Lords. He married Lady Ierne Hastings, the third daughter of the 13th Earl of Huntingdon, in 1896 and had two sons and two daughters. Following the death of his first wife in 1935 he married Sybil Augusta Sant.

He was appointed as Deputy Lieutenant of the County of Westmorland in 1894 and inherited his father's estates in Yorkshire and Westmorland in 1926. He served in the House of Lords, was a Justice of the Peace in both Kent and Westmorland and was twice Mayor of Appleby-in-Westmorland before the Second World War but had to sell most of land and property, mainly to his tenants, in 1947.

His second wife died in 1950, and Tufton died in December 1952 aged 79 at his Bayswater home. His eldest son Henry succeeded him as the 3rd Baron Hothfield.

== Arms ==
Coat of arms of John Tufton, 2nd Baron Hothfield
Crest A Sea Lion sejant Argent debruised by a Bendlet wavy Sable. Escutcheon Sable an Eagle displayed Ermine within a Bordure wavy Or. Supporters On either team an Eagle Ermine gorged with a Collar Gules pendent therefrom an Escutcheon of the Arms of Tufton. Motto Ales Volat Propriis (The bird flies to its own)

== Bibliography ==
- Carlaw, Derek (2020). Kent County Cricketers, A to Z: Part One (1806–1914) (PDF). Cardiff: ACS.

Peerage of the United Kingdom
Preceded by Henry Tufton	Baron Hothfield; 1926–1952	Succeeded by Henry Tufton
