= Nicholas Tufton, 3rd Earl of Thanet =

English nobleman

Nicholas Tufton, 3rd Earl of Thanet (7 August 1631 – 24 November 1679), styled Lord Tufton until 1664, was an English nobleman.

Tufton was the eldest son of John Tufton, 2nd Earl of Thanet, and Lady Margaret, daughter of Richard Sackville, 3rd Earl of Dorset and Lady Anne Clifford. Through his father, he was a great-great-grandson of Lord Burghley. He was imprisoned in the Tower of London in 1655 and again from 1656 to 1658, for allegedly conspiring to capture Charles II. In 1664 he succeeded his father in the earldom.

He successfully claimed the barony of de Clifford through his maternal grandmother Lady Anne Clifford (which had been in abeyance since the death of his great-grandfather George Clifford, 3rd Earl of Cumberland). This barony conferred the honour of hereditary High Sheriff of Westmorland.

Lord Thanet married Lady Elizabeth, daughter of Richard Boyle, 2nd Earl of Cork, on 11 April 1664. They had no children. He died in November 1679, aged 48, and was succeeded in the earldom by his younger brother, John. The Countess of Thanet died in September 1725.

Coat of arms of Nicholas Tufton, 3rd Earl of Thanet
Coronet A Coronet of an Earl Crest A Sea Lion sejant Argent. Escutcheon Sable an Eagle displayed Ermine within a Bordure Argent. Supporters On either side an Eagle Ermine. Motto Ales Volat Propriis (The bird flies to its own)

Peerage of England
Preceded by John Tufton	Earl of Thanet; 1664–1679	Succeeded by John Tufton
Preceded by Anne Clifford	Baron de Clifford; 1676–1679	Succeeded by John Tufton
