= John Tufton, 2nd Earl of Thanet =

English nobleman (1608–1664)

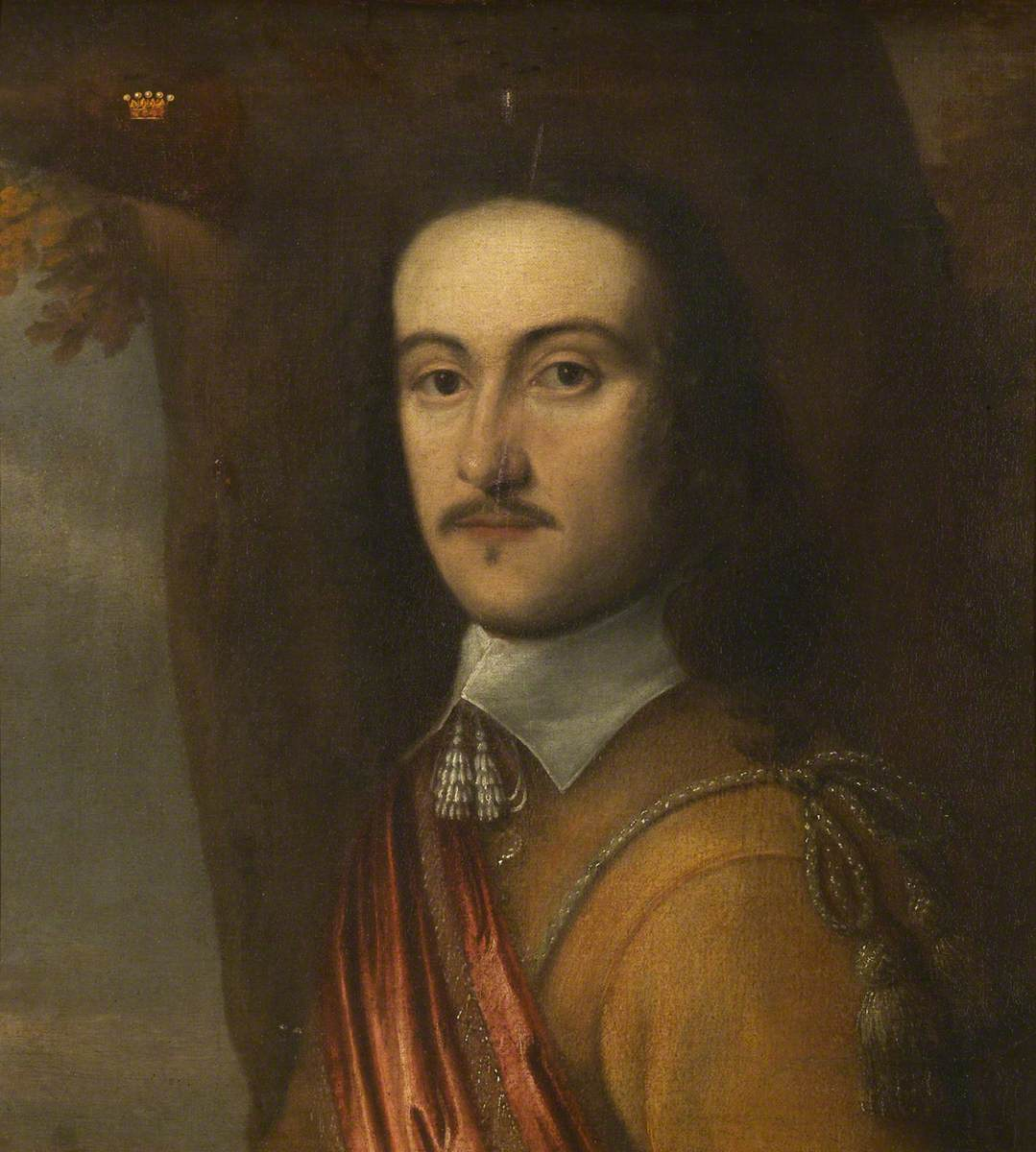
- Portrait of John Tufton (1609–1664), 2nd Earl of Thanet painted by William Dobson (1611–1646) held by the Abbot Hall Art Gallery
- Born: 15 December 1608
- Died: 7 May 1664 (aged 55)
- Spouse: Lady Margaret Sackville (m. 1629)
- Issue: Nicholas Tufton, 3rd Earl of Thanet; Margaret Coventry, Baroness Coventry; John Tufton, 4th Earl of Thanet; Richard Tufton, 5th Earl of Thanet; Thomas Tufton, 6th Earl of Thanet; Col. Sackville Tufton; Lady Anne Tufton; Lady Frances Drax; Cicely Hatton, Viscountess Hatton; Lady Mary Walter; Lady Anne Grimston
- Father: Nicholas Tufton, 1st Earl of Thanet
- Mother: Lady Frances Cecil

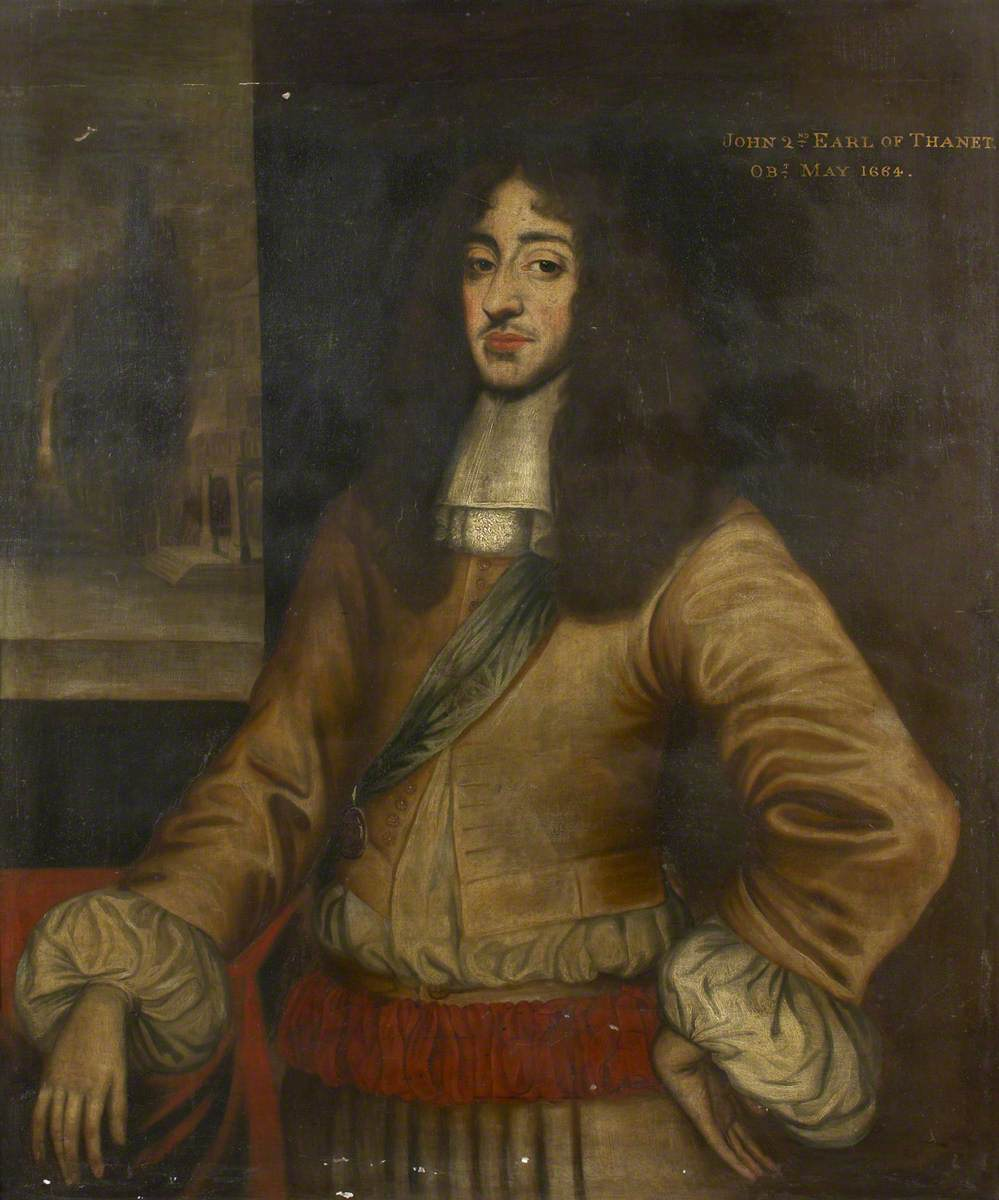
Portrait of John Tufton (1609–1664), 2nd Earl of Thanet painted by John Michael Wright (1617–1694) held by the Abbot Hall Art Gallery

John Tufton, 2nd Earl of Thanet (15 December 1608 – 7 May 1664) was an English nobleman and supporter of Charles I of England. He was the eldest son of Nicholas Tufton, 1st Earl of Thanet, and Lady Frances Cecil, granddaughter of William Cecil, 1st Baron Burghley.

== Career ==
Thanet was a staunch Cavalier, taking part in the Battle of Edge Hill and in 1642 he led a regiment of 100 horse to try to raise a rebellion in Sussex, taking part in the Capture of Chichester, the Battle of Muster Green, and the Siege of Chichester in support of Sir William Brockman in Kent. However, Brockman's revolt quickly collapsed, and Thanet was forced to surrender. He suffered considerably from confiscations and sequestrations of his large estates during the English Civil War.

Among his properties was Bodiam Castle, purchased from the Levett family in 1639, which Thanet sold for £6,000 in 1644.

== Personal life ==
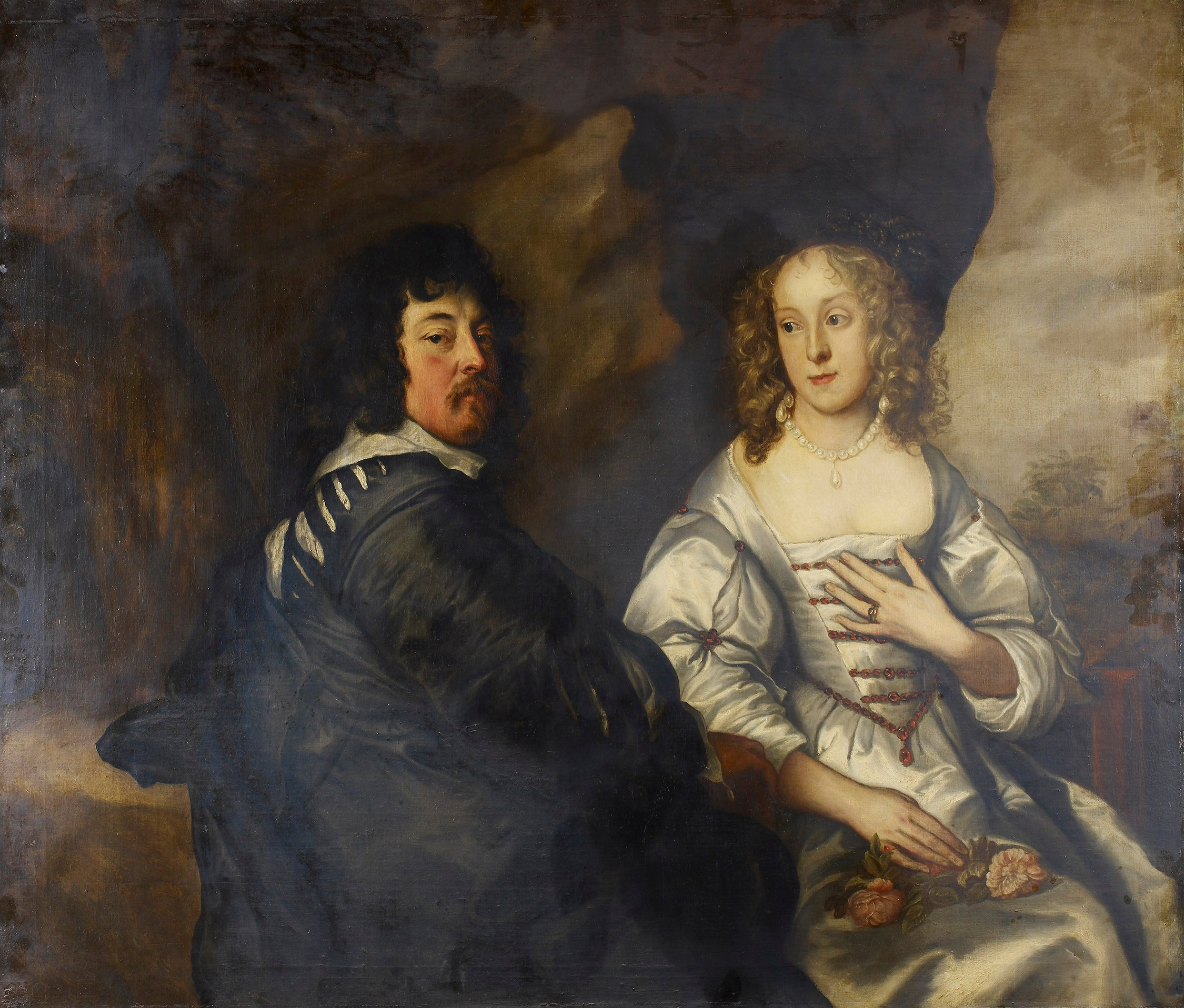
Painting of 2nd Earl of Thanet and his wife, Lady Margaret Sackville (1614–1676)

On 21 April 1629, he married Lady Margaret Sackville (1614–1676), daughter of Richard Sackville, 3rd Earl of Dorset and Lady Anne Clifford. They had eleven children:

- Nicholas Tufton, 3rd Earl of Thanet (1631–1679). no issue
- Lady Margaret Tufton (b. 1636), who married George Coventry, 3rd Baron Coventry on 18 July 1653.
- John Tufton, 4th Earl of Thanet (1638–1680), unmarried.
- Richard Tufton, 5th Earl of Thanet (1640–1684), unmarried.
- Thomas Tufton, 6th Earl of Thanet (1644–1729), married Catherine Cavendish, daughter of 2nd Duke of Newcastle, had many issues including Margaret, Countess of Leicester, who oversaw decorating of Holkham Hall.
- Col. Sackville Tufton (c. 1647–1721), had Sackville Tufton, 7th Earl of Thanet.
- Lady Anne Tufton, who died young.
- Lady Frances Tufton, who married Henry Drax, son of Sir James Drax, died without issue.
- Lady Cicely Tufton (1648–1672), who married Christopher Hatton, 1st Viscount Hatton on 12 February 1667. Had issue Anne Finch, Countess of Winchilsea and Nottingham.
- Lady Mary Tufton (d. 1674), who married Sir William Walter, 2nd Baronet (d. 1693).
- Lady Anne Tufton, who married Sir Samuel Grimston, 3rd Baronet

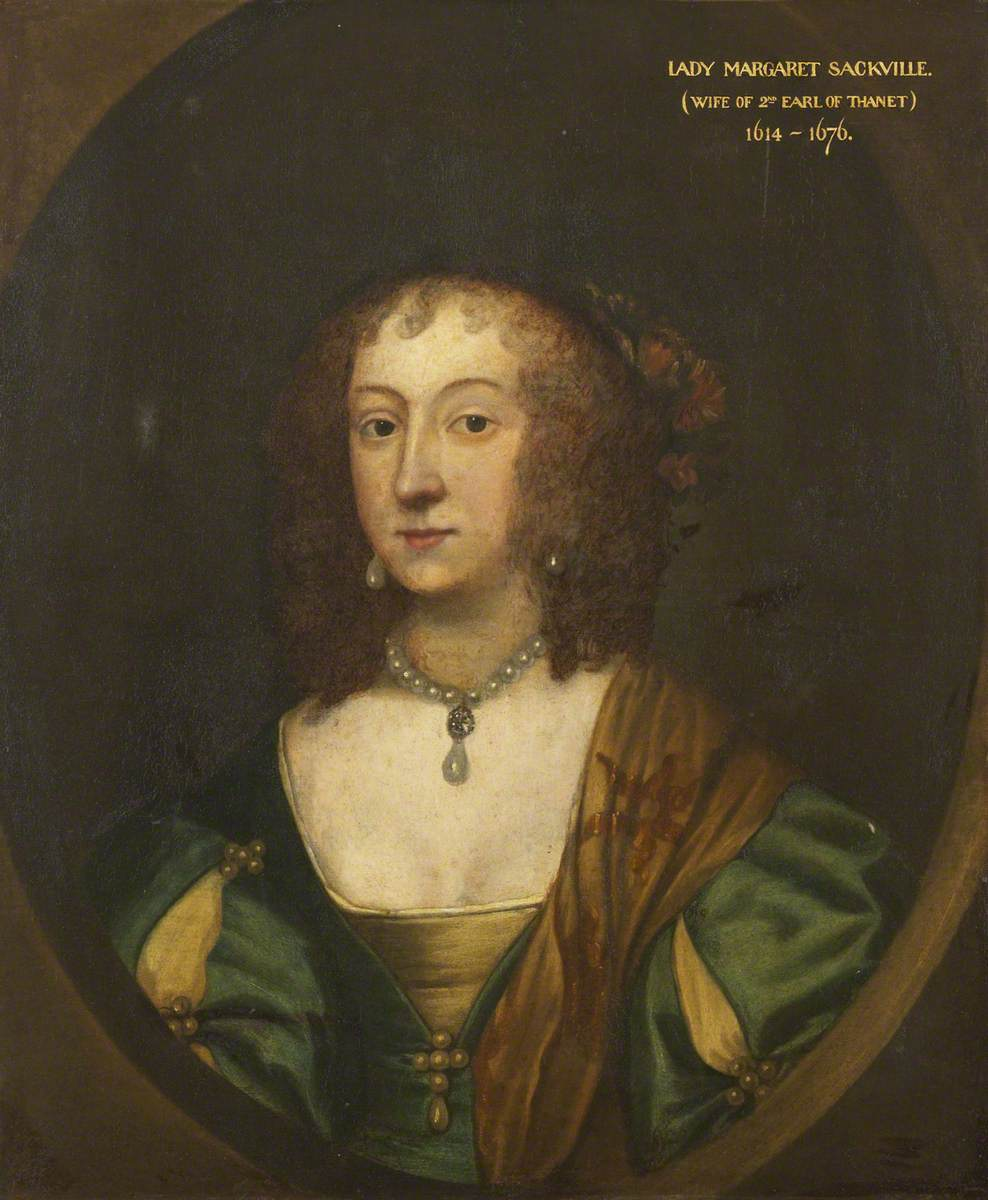
Lady Margaret Sackville (1614-1676), Countess of Thanet by Peter Lely

Curiously, he was succeeded as Earl of Thanet by four of his sons in succession, the first three having no issue.

Thanet died in 1664 at Thanet House.

== Arms ==
Coat of arms of John Tufton, 2nd Earl of Thanet
Coronet A Coronet of an Earl Crest A Sea Lion sejant Argent. Escutcheon Sable an Eagle displayed Ermine within a Bordure Argent. Supporters On either side an Eagle Ermine. Motto Ales Volat Propriis (The bird flies to its own)

Peerage of England
Preceded by Nicholas Tufton	Earl of Thanet; 1632–1664	Succeeded by Nicholas Tufton
