= Earl of Thanet =

Earldom of the Isle of Thanet
- Blazon: Sable an Eagle displayed Ermine within a Bordure Argent, A Sea Lion sejant proper.; On either side an Eagle wings expanded Ermine.
- Creation date: 5 Aug 1628
- Creation: First
- Created by: Charles I
- Peerage: Peerage of England
- First holder: Nicholas Tufton, 1st Earl of Thanet
- Last holder: Henry Tufton, 11th Earl of Thanet
- Status: Extinct
- Extinction date: 12 Jun 1849
- Former seats: Skipton Castle; Appleby Castle; Hothfield Place
- Motto: ALES VOLAT PROPRIIS; The bird flies to its own

Earl of the Isle of Thanet, in practice shortened to Earl of Thanet, was a title in the Peerage of England. It was created in 1628 for Nicholas Tufton, 1st Baron Tufton. He had already succeeded as second Baronet of Hothfield in 1631 and been created Baron Tufton, of Tufton in the County of Sussex, in 1626, also in the Peerage of England. The Baronetcy, of Hothfield in the County of Kent, was created in the Baronetage of England in 1611 for his father, John Tufton. Lord Thanet was succeeded by his son, the second Earl. He married Lady Margaret Sackville, daughter of Richard Sackville, 3rd Earl of Dorset and Lady Anne Clifford. Their son, the third Earl, successfully claimed the barony of de Clifford through his maternal grandmother Lady Anne (which had been in abeyance since the death of his great-grandfather George Clifford, 3rd Earl of Cumberland).

The third Earl was succeeded by his younger brother, the fourth Earl. He represented Steyning in Parliament. The latter was succeeded by his younger brother, the fifth Earl. He sat as Member of Parliament for Appleby. He was succeeded by his younger brother, the sixth Earl. He also represented Appleby in Parliament and served as Lord-Lieutenant of Cumberland and Westmorland. He had no surviving male issue and on his death in 1729 the barony of de Clifford fell into abeyance between his daughters (see Baron de Clifford for further history of the barony). The remaining titles were passed on to the late Earl's nephew, the seventh Earl. He was the son of the Honourable Sackville Tufton, fifth son of the second Earl. He represented Appleby in Parliament from 1722 to 1729. He was succeeded by his eldest surviving son, the eighth Earl. His three sons, the ninth, tenth and eleventh Earls, all succeeded in the titles. The latter served as Lord-Lieutenant of Kent. He never married and the titles became extinct on his death in 1849.

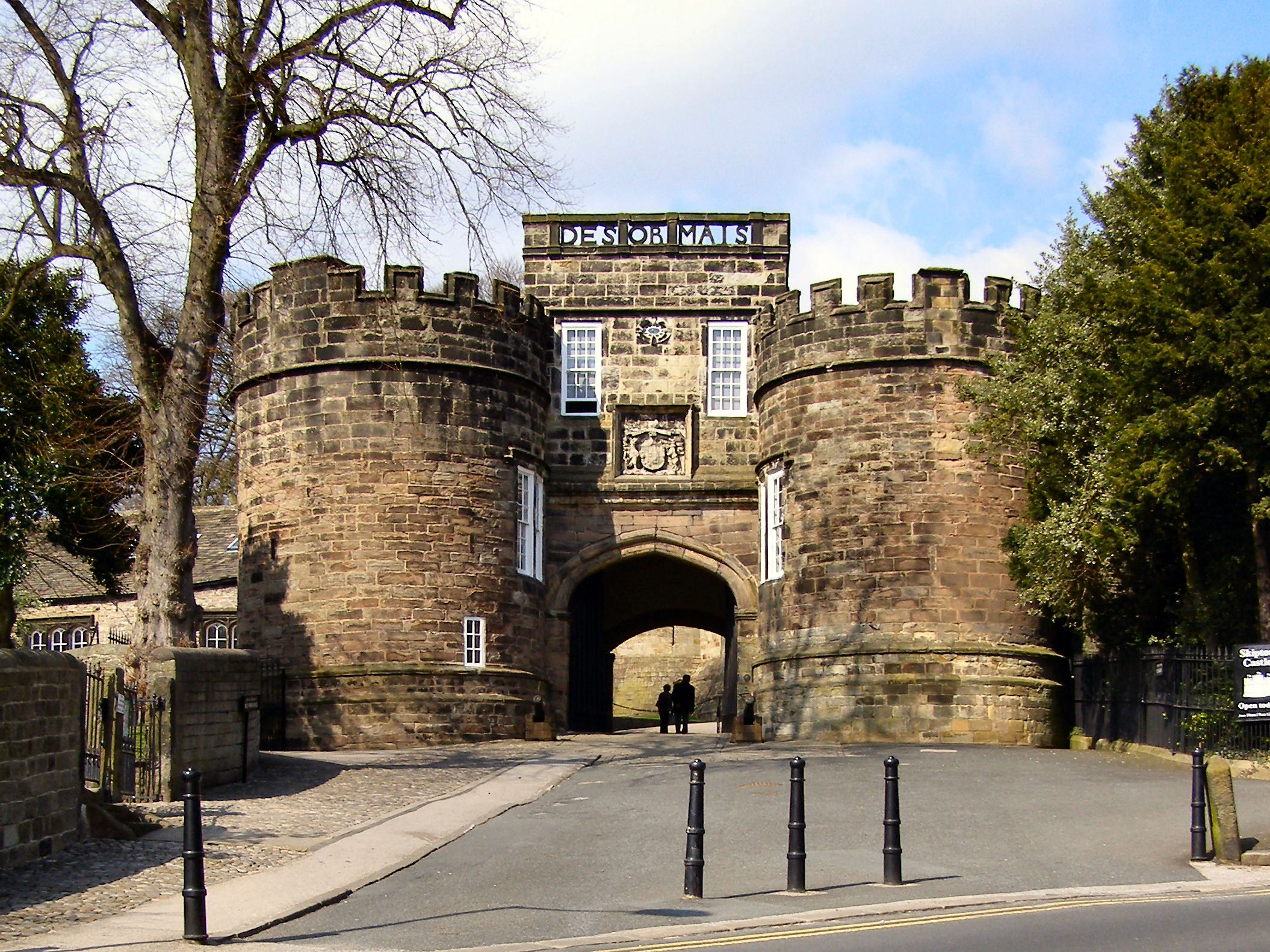
Skipton Castle, North Yorkshire

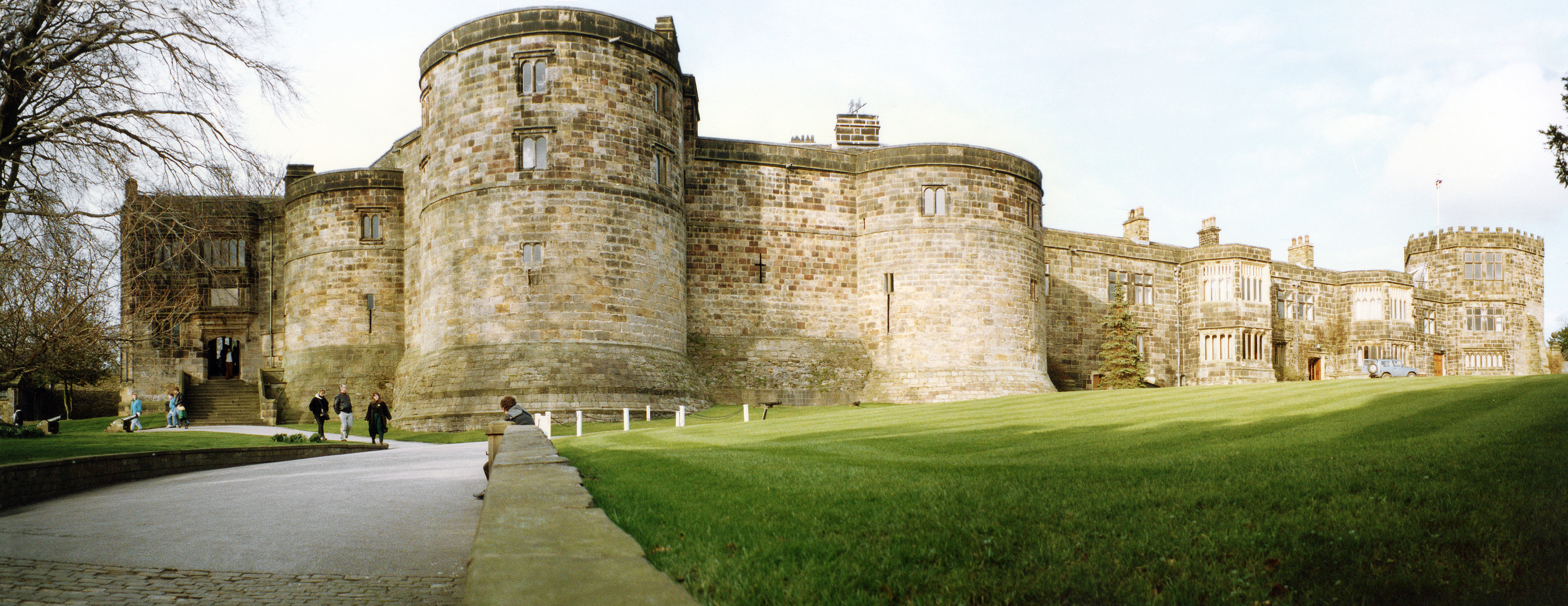
Skipton Castle, Yorkshire

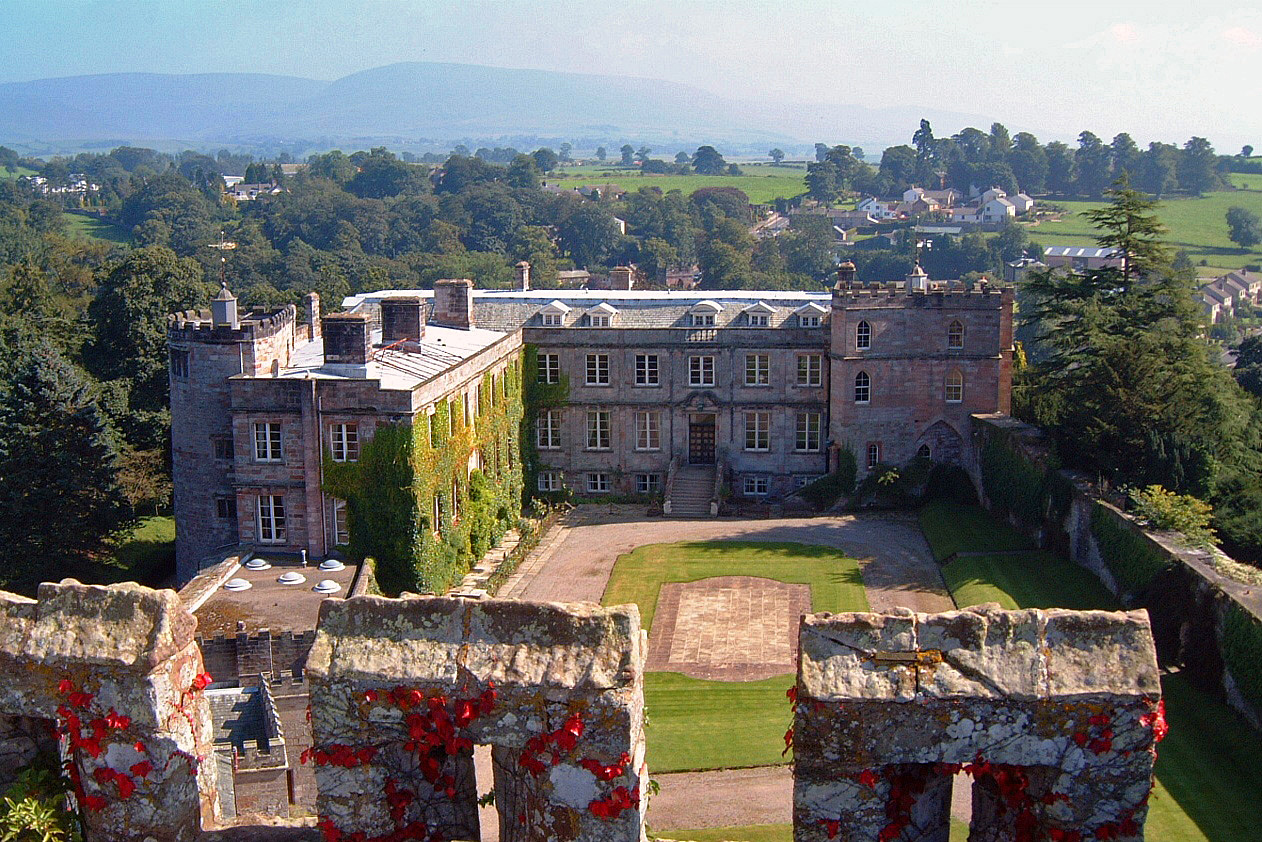
Appleby Castle, in the town of Appleby-in-Westmorland

Their former seats included Skipton Castle, Appleby Castle, and Hothfield Place, Kent.

The last Earl of Thanet devised his estates on his reputed natural son by a French woman, Richard Tufton, who was created a Baronet in 1851. Richard's son, the second Baronet, was created Baron Hothfield in 1881.

== Tufton Baronets, of Hothfield (1611) ==
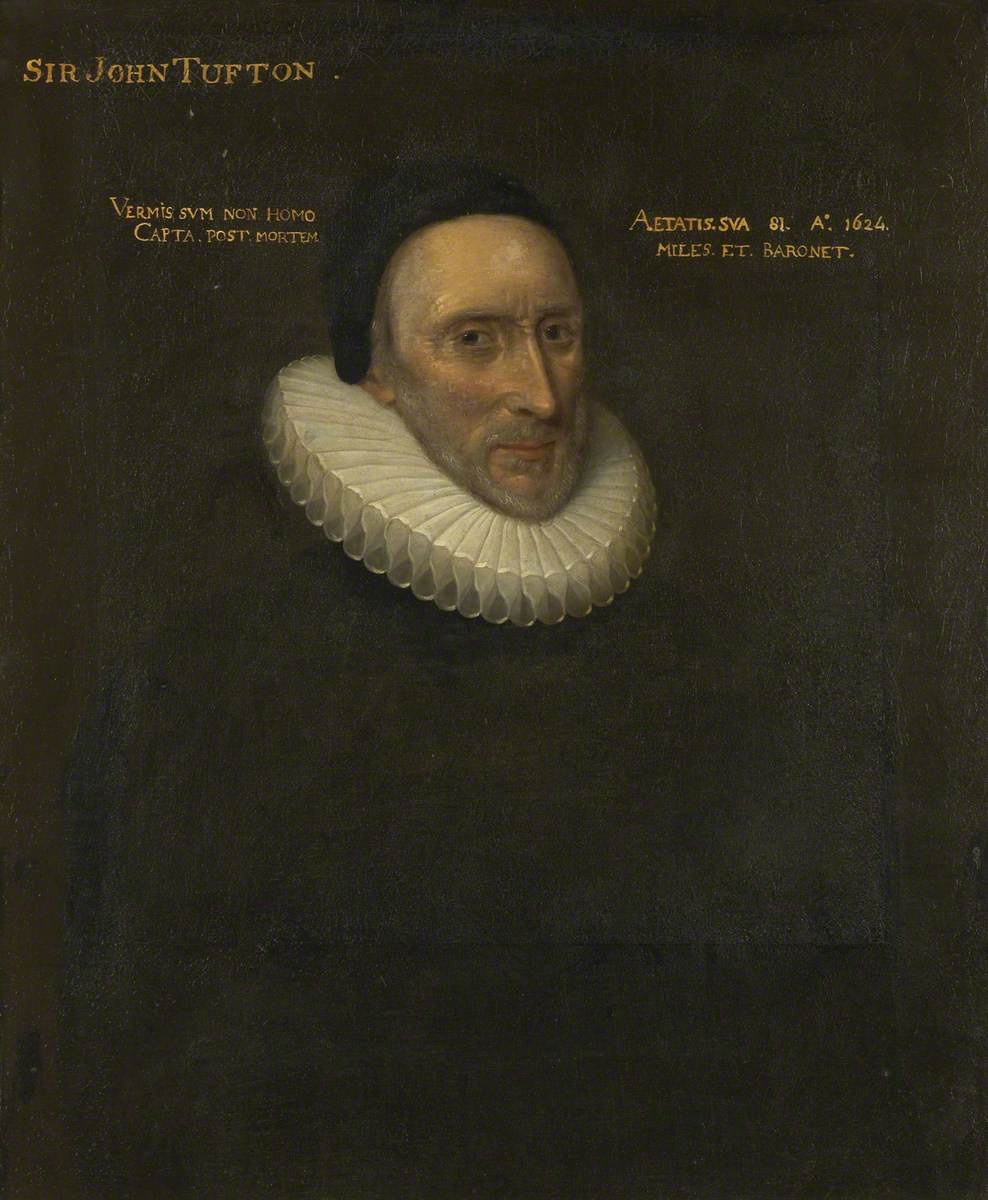
Portrait of Sir John Tufton, 1st Baronet by Cornelius Johnson

- Sir John Tufton, 1st Baronet (d. 1624)
- Sir Nicholas Tufton, 2nd Baronet (1578–1631) (created Baron Tufton in 1626 and Earl of Thanet in 1628)

== Earls of Thanet (1628) ==
- Nicholas Tufton, 1st Earl of Thanet (1578–1631)
- John Tufton, 2nd Earl of Thanet (1608–1664)
- Nicholas Tufton, 3rd Earl of Thanet (1631–1679)
- John Tufton, 4th Earl of Thanet (1638–1680)
- Richard Tufton, 5th Earl of Thanet (1640–1684)
- Thomas Tufton, 6th Earl of Thanet (1644–1729)
  - John Tufton, Lord Tufton (1686–1686)
  - Thomas Tufton, Lord Tufton (1690–1690)
  - John Tufton, Lord Tufton (1691–1691)
- Sackville Tufton, 7th Earl of Thanet (1688–1753)
  - John Tufton, Lord Tufton (c. 1724–1734)
- Sackville Tufton, 8th Earl of Thanet (1733–1786)
- Sackville Tufton, 9th Earl of Thanet (1767–1825)
- Charles Tufton, 10th Earl of Thanet (1770–1832)
- Henry Tufton, 11th Earl of Thanet (1775–1849)

== See also ==
- Baron de Clifford
- Baron Hothfield
- Isle of Thanet
- Hothfield
