= Henry Tufton, 11th Earl of Thanet =

British politician and cricketer

The Right Honourable The Earl of Thanet
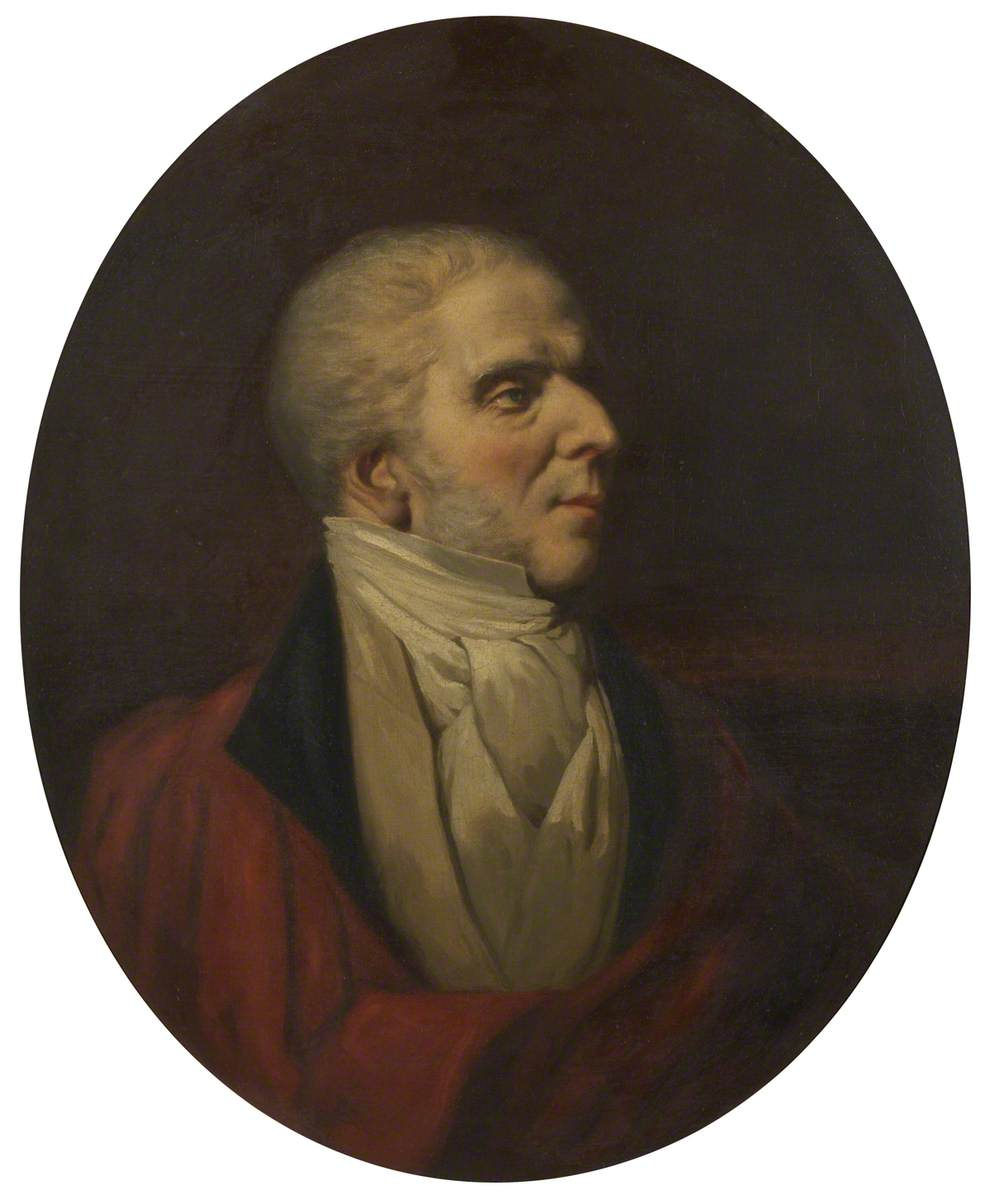

11th Earl of Thanet
- In office 1832–1849
- Preceded by: Charles Tufton, 10th Earl of Thanet

Member of the British Parliament for Rochester
- In office 1796–1802

Member of the British Parliament for Appleby
- In office 1826–1832

Lord Lieutenant of Kent
- In office 1841–1846

Personal details
- Born: 2 January 1775
- Died: 12 June 1849 (aged 74)
- Parents: Sackville Tufton, 8th Earl of Thanet (father); Mary Sackville (mother)
- Sports career
- Sport: cricket
- Team: Marylebone Cricket Club

Henry James Tufton, 11th Earl of Thanet (2 January 1775 – 12 June 1849) was a British politician and cricketer.

== Biography ==
Henry Tufton belonged to an aristocratic family that was prominent in cricketing and other sporting circles. His parents were Sackville Tufton, 8th Earl of Thanet (1733–1786), and Mary Sackville (1746–1778), who was the daughter of Lord John Philip Sackville and the sister of John Frederick Sackville, 3rd Duke of Dorset. Sackville and Dorset were famous patrons of Kent cricket. One of Tufton's older brothers was the Honourable John Tufton (1773–1799), who was also a noted amateur cricketer. Henry Tufton succeeded his elder brother Charles Tufton, 10th Earl of Thanet as 11th Earl of Thanet in April 1832. He served as hereditary High Sheriff of Westmorland from 1832 until his own death. He was member of parliament (MP) for Rochester 1796–1802, for Appleby 1826–1832. He was Lord Lieutenant of Kent 1841–1846.

== Cricket career ==
Tufton was a wicketkeeper-batsman who is believed to have been right-handed and made his debut in historically important matches for Surrey and Sussex in a game against England at the original Lord's Cricket Ground in June 1793. Arthur Haygarth in Scores and Biographies said of Tufton that he "was a successful batsman and wicket-keeper during his short career, which terminated when he was only twenty-six years of age. In the match between the Marylebone Club against the Thursday and Montpelier on 13 July 1796, he stumped six and caught two". In all, Henry Tufton played in 77 important matches until July 1801. His final game was for Marylebone Cricket Club (MCC) versus Homerton Cricket Club at the original Lord's Cricket Ground.

Haygarth adds that when Tufton "was travelling in France in 1803, he was seized on Napoleon's orders (along with the rest of the English) as a prisoner; nor did he on his return to England resume the game [of cricket]. He was at one time member of Parliament for Rochester".

== Private life ==
Henry Tufton did not marry and was the last of the Earls of Thanet. He was buried in the family vault at Rainham Church in Kent. Haygarth says he had no monument and only an inscription on his coffin that stated in 1849:

HENRY TUFTON,
Earl of Thanet,
Hereditary High Sheriff of the county of Westmorland,
Late Lord Lieutenant of Kent,
Died June 12, 1849
IN THE 75TH YEAR OF HIS AGE

== Arms ==
Coat of arms of Henry Tufton, 11th Earl of Thanet
Coronet A Coronet of an Earl Crest A Sea Lion sejant Argent. Escutcheon Sable an Eagle displayed Ermine within a Bordure Argent. Supporters On either team an Eagle Ermine. Motto Ales Volat Propriis (The bird flies to its own)

Parliament of Great Britain
Preceded by George Best; Sir Richard King, Bt	Member of Parliament for Rochester; 1796–1800; With: Sir Richard King, Bt	Succeeded by Parliament of the United Kingdom
Parliament of the United Kingdom
Preceded by Parliament of Great Britain	Member of Parliament for Rochester; 1801–1802; With: Sir Richard King, Bt	Succeeded by Sir Sidney Smith; James Hulkes
Preceded by Adolphus Dalrymple; Thomas Creevey	Member of Parliament for Appleby; 1826–1832; With: Viscount Maitland	Succeeded by Charles Henry Barham; Viscount Maitland
Honorary titles
Preceded by The Earl of Thanet	High Sheriff of Westmorland; 1832–1849	Succeeded by George Edward Wilson
Preceded by The Marquess Camden	Lord Lieutenant of Kent; 1840–1846	Succeeded by The Earl Cowper
Peerage of England
Preceded by Charles Tufton	Earl of Thanet; 1832–1849	Extinct
