= Katherine Lowther =

English electoral patron (1653–1713)

The Right Honourable The Viscountess Lonsdale
- Born: 21 September 1653; Caus Castle
- Died: 7 January 1713 (aged 59); London
- Spouse: John Lowther, 1st Viscount Lonsdale (m. 1674; died 1700)
- Children: 14

Katherine Lowther born Katherine Thynne became Katherine, Viscountess Lonsdale (21 September 1653 – 7 January 1713) was an English electoral patron. After her husband's death, she took over with his political influence in north-west England.

== Life ==
Lowther was born into the now ruined Caus Castle in 1653 into the Thynne family. She was a daughter of Sir Henry Thynne, 1st Baronet and Mary Coventry, her grandfather was Thomas Coventry, 1st Baron Coventry.

On 3 December 1674 she married John Lowther who was the first son of Colonel John Lowther and Elizabeth Bellingham. The Lowthers were an influential north-west English family. Their first child, Mary, was born at the home of her brother, Thomas Thynne, 1st Viscount Weymouth, in Staffordshire. Her husband's grandfather died on 30 November 1675 and he became the 2nd Baronet of Lowther in the County of Westmorland.

For the next few years she lived with her husband in London, where several of their children were born, after 1680 she lived mostly in Lowther. After the birth of a son in 1694, Katherine became seriously ill after childbirth so she took a cure in Bath and then stayed in London until her health was restored. Her husband was a long-serving Knight of the Shire for Westmorland in the House of Commons and he became Lord High Treasurer for several months in 1690. He resigned as Lord Lieutenant of Cumberland and Westmorland and Vice-Chamberlain of the Household in 1694. On 28 May 1696 he became Viscount Lonsdale and a member of the House of Lords and Katherine became Viscountess Lonsdale. Her husband became Lord Privy Seal in 1699, but he died on 10 July 1700.

== Widow ==
Lady Lonsdale was able to execute her husband's will thoroughly as their sons were still minors. She took over her husband's estates after consulting her brother Lord Weymouth and Sir John Lowther, 2nd Baronet († 1706), one of her husband's cousins. She ignored her brother, Lord Weymouth's advice to ignore the 1701 general election in Westmorland, because her husband had been a Whig. Sir Christopher Musgrave, 4th Baronet was running as the Tories' candidate for Westmorland but she assisted the Whig candidate Sir Sir Richard Sandford, 3rd Baronet who was elected. Lady Lonsdale remained a lifelong supporter of the Whigs. After the death of Sir John Lowther, she supported his son James Lowther in the general elections of 1708 and 1710, in which he was elected MP for Cumberland.

== Private life ==
With her husband she had five sons, two of whom died as children, and nine daughters, four of whom survived her, including: Mary Lowther († 1706), Sir John Wentworth, 1st Baronet, Elizabeth Lowther who married Sir William Ramsden, 2nd Baronet, Jane Lowther († 1752), Margaret Lowther who married Sir Joseph Pennington, 2nd Baronet, Barbara Lowther († 1716) (married Thomas Howard), Richard Lowther, 2nd Viscount Lonsdale (1694–1713), Henry Lowther, 3rd Viscount Lonsdale (1694–1751) and Anthony Lowther († 1741). Anthony would be a member of parliament in 1721.

== Death ==
Lowther died in London in 1713 and she was buried like her husband in Lowther, It was said that no one was invited to her funeral but lots came. In her will she considered her three sons, three of her daughters and Sir John Wentworth, the husband of her late daughter Mary, but not her daughter Barbara. Barbara had secretly married the Catholic Thomas Howard of Corby Castle in 1705. This necessitated a difficult series of negotiations over the property rights of the bride and her children, which took till September 1706 to complete.
