= Edward Meryon Wilson =

English Hispanist (1906–1977)

Edward Meryon Wilson, FBA (14 May 1906 – 21 November 1977) was an English Hispanist and bibliographer. He was Cervantes Professor of Spanish at the University of London from 1945 to 1953, and Professor of Spanish at the University of Cambridge from 1953 to 1973.

== Early life ==
Born in Kendal on 14 May 1906, Wilson was the son of an engineer and managing director; his elder brother Gilbert became a lecturer in structural geology at Imperial College London, and a younger brother, Paul, became Lord Lieutenant of Westmorland and then Cumbria and was made a life peer in 1976.

Having three times failed the Common Entrance Examination to attend Gresham's School, Wilson was educated at Windermere Grammar School, where he developed a passion for poetry, and at Trinity College, Cambridge, where he completed Part 1 of the English Tripos in 1926 and switched to modern languages for Part 2 (1928). He became friends with William Empson, James Smith and Ronald Bottrall. Wilson had planned on going into the priesthood, but changed his mind while at Cambridge.

Wilson's introduction to Spanish probably came from his maternal uncle Cecil Meryon Harris, who had retired to Spain. Wilson quickly blossomed as a Spanish scholar, and in 1929 his ability was recognised by the award of an Esmé Howard Studentship to the Residencia de Estudiantes in Madrid. In 1930 he also gained the Rouse Ball Studentship at Trinity College. He undertook PhD studies; the degree was awarded in 1934.

Wilson was a visiting fellow at Princeton University in 1932 and the next year was appointed an assistant lecturer at the University of Cambridge. In 1939, he was appointed as a full lecturer there; he was a fellow of Emmanuel College, Cambridge, for nine months in 1945. That year, he moved to the University of London to take up the Cervantes Professorship of Spanish (succeeding Antonio Pastor), which he held until 1953, when he was appointed Professor of Spanish at the University of Cambridge. Wilson returned to Emmanuel College, where he was vice-master from 1961 to 1965, and retired from his chair in 1973.

Recognised as an expert on the works of Pedro Calderón de la Barca, Wilson also published work on other aspects of Spanish literature and bibliography (influenced by Antonio Rodríguez-Moñino, Antonio Pérez Gómez, John William Crow, J. C. T. Oates and F. J. Norton). Wilson was elected a fellow of the British Academy in 1964, gave the Taylorian Lecture in 1966, received an honorary doctorate in 1972, and served as president of the Association of Hispanists of Great Britain and Ireland from 1971 to 1973. He was the subject of a Festschrift edited by R. O. Jones, Studies in Spanish Literature of the Golden Age Presented to Edward M. Wilson (London: Tamesis Books, 1973). He died on 21 November 1977.
