= Harry Pickering =

Harry Pickering may refer to:

- Harry Pickering (cricketer)
- Harry Pickering (footballer)

== See also ==
- Henry Pickering (disambiguation)
