= Purcell (architects) =

British architectural firm

Purcell is a British architectural design practice, founded in 1947 by Donovan Purcell. It has 11 regional studios in the UK and four studios in the Asia Pacific region.

== History ==
In 1947, Donovan Purcell set up a small practice in Bury St Edmunds. Working on church and army buildings for many years, Purcell developed his expertise in conservation and in 1960 was appointed Surveyor to the Fabric of Ely Cathedral.

In 1965, Purcell partnered with architects Peter Miller and William “Bill” Tritton and the practice of Purcell, Miller and Tritton was established.

Over the years, the practice set up studios across the UK to provide strong regional coverage. The practice rebranded as Purcell in 2012 and expanded, opening studios in Cardiff, Manchester, Newcastle and Nottingham. Purcell acquired Worcester-based architect S T Walker and Duckham in 2015 and merged with Norfolk-based practice Reynolds Jury Architecture in 2016.

Internationally, the practice established its first studio in Hong Kong in 2009 and has developed its coverage in Asia Pacific with heritage consultancy teams in Melbourne and Sydney, Australia.

In May 2019, it became a limited company, transitioning to an employee ownership model in 2021.

As of 2022, Purcell has UK studios in Bristol, Cambridge, Canterbury, Cardiff, Colchester, Leeds, London, Manchester, Norwich, Oxford and York. The practice is the UK's 16th largest practice according to the AJ100 in 2021 and ranked 83rd in the World Architecture 100 in 2022.

Notable employees of Purcell have included Corinne Bennett.

== Services ==
The practice offers design services, masterplanning, heritage consultancy, conservation expertise, funding advice and planning advice. It has worked on many UK listed buildings.

Purcell works across eight sectors: cultural, education, hospitality, places of worship, public, residential, transport, and workplace and retail.

== Projects ==
Purcell has worked on notable public and private buildings in the UK and internationally including:

- Bristol Aerospace Centre, Filton Airfield
- Canterbury Cathedral
- Cardigan Castle
- CoRE (Centre of Refurbishment Excellence)
- Coworth Park Spa
- Durham Cathedral
- Flinders Street Station
- Florence Institute
- Hampton Court Palace
- Hong Kong Cricket Club
- The Hyde, Dillington House
- National Maritime Museum, Sammy Ofer Wing
- Oxford University Museum of Natural History
- Penarth Pier Pavilion
- Shackleton's Hut, Cape Royd
- The Wallace Collection, The Great Gallery
- Tai Kwun Centre for Heritage and Arts
- Mandarin Oriental, Hyde Park
- National Portrait Gallery
- Renovation of Clifton Cathedral, Bristol

== Awards ==
Year	Project	Award(s)
2008	World Heritage Centre, Blaenavon Industrial Landscape	Gold Medal for Architecture, National Eisteddfod of Wales
2008	Kew Palace	RICS National Museums & Heritage Award for Excellence; RICS Conservation Award
2010	Arnos Vale Cemetery	RIBA South West Town and Country Design Awards: Conservation Award
2010	Stowe House, Marble Saloon	Country Life Restoration of the Century
2010	The Hyde, Dillington House	RIBA Award
2010	Wentworth Castle & Stainborough Park	Country Life Restoration of the Century Award
2011	Leighton House Museum	RIBA London Arts & Leisure Award
2011	No. 1 Smithery, Chatham Historic Dockyard	RIBA South/South East Award
2012	Ballyfin Hotel	RICS Project of the Year Award
2012	Florence Institute	IHBC North West Award for Conservation
2012	Leighton House Museum	Europa Nostra Conservation Award
2012	National Maritime Museum, Sammy Ofer Wing	RIBA London Award
2012	No.1 Smithery, Chatham Historic Dockyard	RICS Award
2012	St Paul's Cathedral, London	RIBA English Heritage Award for Conservation; RIBA London Award
2012	Stowe House	Georgian Group/EH Special Award for Outstanding Achievement
2012	Tudor House Museum	RICS South East Project of the Year Award; RICS South East Building Conservation Award
2013	Florence Institute	RICS National Building Conservation Award; RIBA North West Conservation Award; RIBA North West Award; RICS North West Building Conservation Award; Civic Trust Award Community Recognition
2014	Ballyfin Hotel	International Hotel & Property Awards, Best Suite
2014	Centre of Refurbishment Excellence	RIBA West Midlands Sustainability Award; RIBA West Midlands Award
2014	Coworth Park Spa	International Hotel & Property Awards, Best Spa
2014	Creative Arts Building, City College	Civic Trust Award
2014	Penarth Pier Pavilion	RICS Project of the Year; RICS Wales Community Benefit Award; Pier of the Year
2015	Black Gate	RICS North East Building Conservation Award
2015	Hexham Abbey	RICS North East Tourism and Leisure
2015	King's State Apartments, Kensington Palace	RICS London Building Conservation Award
2015	Oxford University Museum of Natural History	Civic Trust Awards, AABC Conservation Award
2016	Base Court, Hampton Court Palace	RICS London Building Conservation Award; RICS London Building of the Year Award
2016	Cardigan Castle	RSAW Welsh Architecture Award; RSAW Conservation Award
2016	Waddesdon Bequest Gallery, British Museum	RIBA London Award
2017	Aerospace Bristol	World Architecture Festival: Completed Buildings (shortlisted)
2017	Cardigan Castle	Channel 4 Restoration of the Year
2017	Cromford Mills	EU Prize for Cultural Heritage
2018	Aerospace Bristol	RICS South West Awards 2018: Leisure & Tourism Award and Project of the Year
2018	Canterbury Cathedral Great South Window	RICS South East Awards 2018: Building Conservation Award
2018	Delapre Abbey	RICS East Midlands Awards 2018: Conservation Award, Tourism and Leisure Award
2018	Durham Cathedral Open Treasure	RIBA National Award for Cultural Buildings, RIBA North East Building of the Year, RIBA North East Regional Award, RIBA North East Conservation Award
2018	St Fagans National Museum of History	RICS Wales Awards 2018: Tourism and Leisure Award
2018	Yr Ysgwrn	RICS Wales Awards 2018: Building Conservation Award, RSAW (RIBA Wales) Welsh Architecture of the Year Award, Conservation Award, Project Architect of the Year, Building of the Year
