= Charles Howard, 3rd Earl of Carlisle =

British nobleman, peer and statesman (c. 1669 – 1738)

The Right Honourable The Earl of Carlisle PC
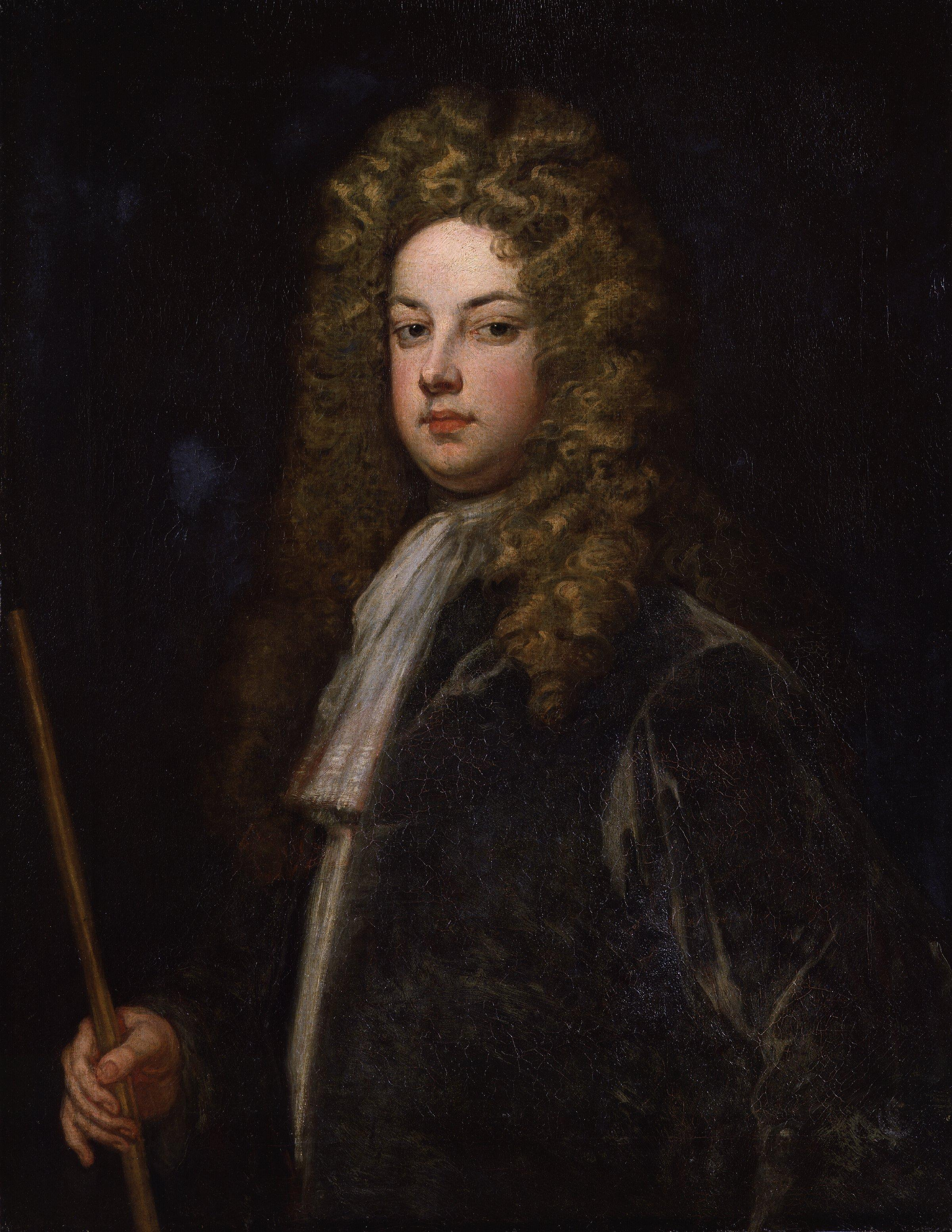

First Lord of the Treasury
- In office 23 May 1715 – 10 October 1715
- Monarch: George I
- Preceded by: The Earl of Halifax
- Succeeded by: Robert Walpole
- In office 30 December 1701 – 8 May 1702
- Monarch: Anne
- Preceded by: The Lord Godolphin
- Succeeded by: The Lord Godolphin as Lord High Treasurer

Member of Parliament for Morpeth
- In office 1689–1692 Serving with Roger Fenwick
- Monarchs: William III and Mary II
- Preceded by: Sir Henry Pickering
- Succeeded by: George Nicholas

Personal details
- Born: Charles Howard; 1669
- Died: 1 May 1738 (aged 68–69) Bath, Somerset, England
- Spouse: Lady Anne de Vere Capell
- Children: 6
- Parent(s): Edward Howard, 2nd Earl of Carlisle; Elizabeth Uvedale

Charles Howard, 3rd Earl of Carlisle, PC (c. 1669 – 1 May 1738), styled Viscount Morpeth from 1685 to 1692, was a British nobleman, peer, and Whig statesman. He served two brief terms as First Lord of the Treasury and commissioned the construction of Castle Howard.

== Early life ==
Charles Howard was the eldest son of Edward Howard, 2nd Earl of Carlisle and his wife Elizabeth, daughter of Sir William Uvedale. He was educated at Morpeth Grammar School. Howard inherited the family estates and title Earl of Carlisle on the death of his father in 1692. In 1697 he inherited the rump of the estates of his uncle, Sir John Fenwick, 3rd Baronet, following his execution.

== Political career ==
He was elected as a Member of Parliament for Morpeth in the Convention Parliament in 1689, while still underage, with a London home in Soho Square. He was re-elected unopposed in the 1690 English general election and in a subsequent list of the Commons compiled by Thomas Osborne, Howard was classed as a Whig. In August 1690 he was granted a leave of absence to undertake the Grand Tour. Upon succeeded to his father's title in 1692, he assumed his seat in the House of Lords.

As Earl of Carlisle, he was appointed Governor of Carlisle from 1693 to 1728 and Lord-Lieutenant of Cumberland and of Westmorland from 1694 to 1714. William III made him a Gentleman of the Bedchamber between 1700 and 1702, First Lord of the Treasury from 1701 to 1702 and Privy Counsellor in 1701. He acted as Earl Marshal between 1701 and 1706 because his cousin, the Duke of Norfolk, was a minor. He exercised considerable influence in parliamentary affairs and became the political patron of many Whig candidates. He voted consistently with Whigs in the Lords, a notable exception being his opposition to the attainder of his uncle, Sir John Fenwick, in 1696.

On Anne, Queen of Great Britain's death on 1 August 1714 he was appointed Lord Justice of the Realm until the arrival of King George I of Great Britain on 18 September 1714. The new king reappointed him as First Lord of the Treasury from 23 May 1715 to 10 October 1715 and made him Constable of the Tower of London between 1715 and 1722. John Macky described Carlisle as a "gentleman of great interest in the country... [who] hath a very good understanding".

== Business dealings ==
From 1699 to 1709 Carlisle was involved with the fraudulent schemes of pirate John Breholt. First Carlisle backed a plan to dive on and salvage a supposed wreck off Havana – Breholt even named his ship Carlisle – which came to naught, after which Breholt let slip that he intended to sail for Cape Verde and then to Madagascar to engage in outright piracy. A few years later Carlisle backed Breholt's plan (presented directly to Queen Anne) to pardon the pirates of Madagascar and have them return to England with their collected wealth. This scheme fell apart when Breholt's pirate past was exposed.

== Personal life ==
In 1699 he commissioned a new Baroque mansion, Castle Howard, in Yorkshire, England to the design of Sir John Vanbrugh which is still occupied by his descendants.

He married in 1683 Lady Anne de Vere Capell, daughter of Arthur Capell, 1st Earl of Essex. They had six children:

- Henry Howard, 4th Earl of Carlisle (1693–1758)
- General Sir Charles Howard (c. 1696–1765)
- Lady Harriet Howard, died young
- Lady Elizabeth Anne Howard, married Nicholas Lechmere, 1st Baron Lechmere, then Sir Thomas Robinson, 1st Baronet
- Lady Anne Howard, married Rich Ingram, 5th Viscount of Irvine, then Brig-Gen. William Douglas of Kirkness (d. 1747)
- Lady Mary Howard, unmarried

He died in Bath in 1738 and is buried in The Mausoleum, Castle Howard.

Parliament of England
Preceded by Sir Henry Pickering, Bt; Theophilus Oglethorpe	Member of Parliament for Morpeth; 1689–1692; With: Roger Fenwick	Succeeded by Roger Fenwick; George Nicholas
Political offices
Preceded by The Lord Godolphin	First Lord of the Treasury; 1701–1702	Succeeded by The Lord Godolphin (as Lord High Treasurer)
Preceded by The Earl of Halifax	First Lord of the Treasury; 1715	Succeeded by Robert Walpole
New office	Master of the Harriers; 1730–1738	Succeeded by The Lord Walpole
Military offices
Preceded by Jeremiah Bubb	Governor of Carlisle; 1693–1738	Succeeded by John Folliot
Honorary titles
Preceded by Sir John Lowther	Lord Lieutenant of Cumberland and Westmorland; 1694–1738	Succeeded by The 3rd Viscount Lonsdale
Preceded by The 1st Viscount Lonsdale	Custos Rotulorum of Cumberland; 1700–1714	Succeeded by The Earl of Thanet
Preceded by The Earl of Thanet	Custos Rotulorum of Cumberland; 1715–1738	Succeeded by The 3rd Viscount Lonsdale
Preceded by The Earl of Northampton	Constable of the Tower; 1715–1722	Succeeded by The Earl of Lincoln
Preceded by Hatton Compton	Lord Lieutenant of the Tower Hamlets; 1717–1722	Succeeded by The Earl of Lincoln
Preceded by The Viscount Cobham	Constable and Governor of Windsor Castle; 1723–1730	Succeeded by The Duke of St Albans
Preceded by The Earl of Peterborough and Monmouth	Senior Privy Counsellor; 1735–1738	Succeeded by The Duke of Somerset
Peerage of England
Preceded by Edward Howard	Earl of Carlisle; 1692–1738	Succeeded by Henry Howard
