= Henry Pickering =

Henry Pickering may refer to:

- Sir Henry Pickering, 1st Baronet (died 1668), English landowner and politician
- Sir Henry Pickering, 2nd Baronet (c. 1656–1705), English politician
- Henry Pickering (artist) (active c.1745–d.1771), English portrait painter
