= Roger Fenwick (MP for Morpeth) =

English politician

Roger Fenwick (c. 1662 – by October 1701) was an English politician.

== Biography ==
Roger Fenwick was the eldest son of William Fenwick (died 1675) of Irthington, Cumberland and educated at St. Edmund Hall, Oxford, matriculating on 25 June 1678, aged 16. He entered Grays's Inn in 1678 and was called to the bar in 1686. He inherited Stanton Hall, Northumberland from his grandfather in 1689.

Fenwick was a Member of Parliament (MP) for Morpeth from 1689 to 1695. He died aged approximately thirty-nine.

== Family ==
Fenwick married Elizabeth, daughter and heiress of George Fenwick of Brinkburn, Northumberland; they had four sons (1 d.v.p.) and two daughters.

== Notes ==
Parliament of England
Preceded by Henry Pickering with Theophilus Oglethorpe	Member of Parliament for Morpeth; 1689–1695; With: Charles Howard with George Nicholas	Succeeded by George Nicholas with Henry Belasyse
