= Edward Howard, 2nd Earl of Carlisle =

English Whig politician (1646–1692)

Edward Howard

Member of Parliament for Carlisle
- In office 1681–1685 Serving with Christopher Musgrave

Member of Parliament for Cumberland
- In office 1679–1681 Serving with Sir John Lowther

Member of Parliament for Morpeth
- In office 1666–1679 Serving with Sir George Downing

Personal details
- Born: 27 November 1646
- Died: 23 April 1692 (aged 45)
- Party: Whig
- Spouse: Elizabeth Uvedale (m. 1668)
- Children: Charles Howard; William Howard (died 1701)
- Parent: Charles Howard (father)

Edward Howard, 2nd Earl of Carlisle (27 November 1646 – 23 April 1692), known as Viscount Morpeth from 1661 to 1685, was an English Whig politician.

== Biography ==
Carlisle was the eldest son of Charles Howard, 1st Earl of Carlisle, and his wife Anne, daughter of Edward Howard, 1st Baron Howard of Escrick. He became a captain of foot in 1667 and the same year served as an ensign in the English gens d'armes in the French Royal Army during the War of Devolution.

While still underage, he was chosen by his father to succeed Henry Cavendish as the Member of Parliament for Northumberland, but the opportunity did not materialise. He was elected to the House of Commons for Morpeth in 1666, a seat he held until 1679. He was a generally inactive member of the Cavalier Parliament, but usually voted with the court in favour of supply. From 1667, he was a justice of the peace for Cumberland. He represented Cumberland from 1679 to 1681 and Carlisle from 1681 to 1685. During the Exclusion Crisis, he voted against the committal of the Exclusion Bill. The latter year he succeeded his father in the earldom and entered the House of Lords. He also served as Deputy Governor of Carlisle between 1679 and 1687 and was an alderman (from 1680) and mayor (1683–84) of the town. Before the Glorious Revolution, in 1687 Carlisle was listed among those opposed to James II. He pledged his allegiance to William of Orange in July 1688.

Lord Carlisle married Elizabeth, daughter of Sir William Uvedale of Wickham, Hampshire, in 1668. He died in April 1692, aged 45, and was succeeded in his titles by his elder son Charles. Lady Carlisle died in 1696.. His other son was William Howard (died 1701).

Parliament of England
Preceded by Sir George Downing; Henry Widdrington	Member of Parliament for Morpeth; 1666–1679; With: Sir George Downing	Succeeded by Sir George Downing; Daniel Collingwood
Preceded by Sir John Lowther; Richard Lamplugh	Member of Parliament for Cumberland; 1679–1681; With: Sir John Lowther	Succeeded by Sir John Lowther; Sir George Fletcher
Preceded by Sir Philip Howard; Christopher Musgrave	Member of Parliament for Carlisle; 1681–1685; With: Christopher Musgrave	Succeeded by Christopher Musgrave; James Grahme
Peerage of England
Preceded by Charles Howard	Earl of Carlisle; 1685–1692	Succeeded by Charles Howard
