= Custos Rotulorum of Westmorland =

This is a list of people who have served as Custos Rotulorum of Westmorland.

- Ambrose Middleton bef. 1544 – aft. 1547
- Alan Bellingham bef. 1558–1578
- Sir Thomas Boynton bef. 1579–1582
- Robert Bragge 1582–1584
- Sir Thomas Strickland 1584–1612
- Henry Clifford, 1st Baron Clifford 1621–1641
- Sir Philip Musgrave, 2nd Baronet 1641–1646
- Interregnum
- Sir Philip Musgrave, 2nd Baronet 1660–1678
- John Lowther, 1st Viscount Lonsdale 1678–1700
- Thomas Wharton, 5th Baron Wharton 1700–1702
- Thomas Tufton, 6th Earl of Thanet 1702–1706
- Thomas Wharton, 1st Earl of Wharton 1706–1714
- Thomas Tufton, 6th Earl of Thanet 1714
- Thomas Wharton, 1st Marquess of Wharton 1714–1715
- Henry Lowther, 3rd Viscount Lonsdale 1715–1751

For later custodes rotulorum, see Lord Lieutenant of Westmorland.
