= Thomas Tufton, 6th Earl of Thanet =

English politician (1644–1729)

The Right Honourable The Earl of Thanet PC
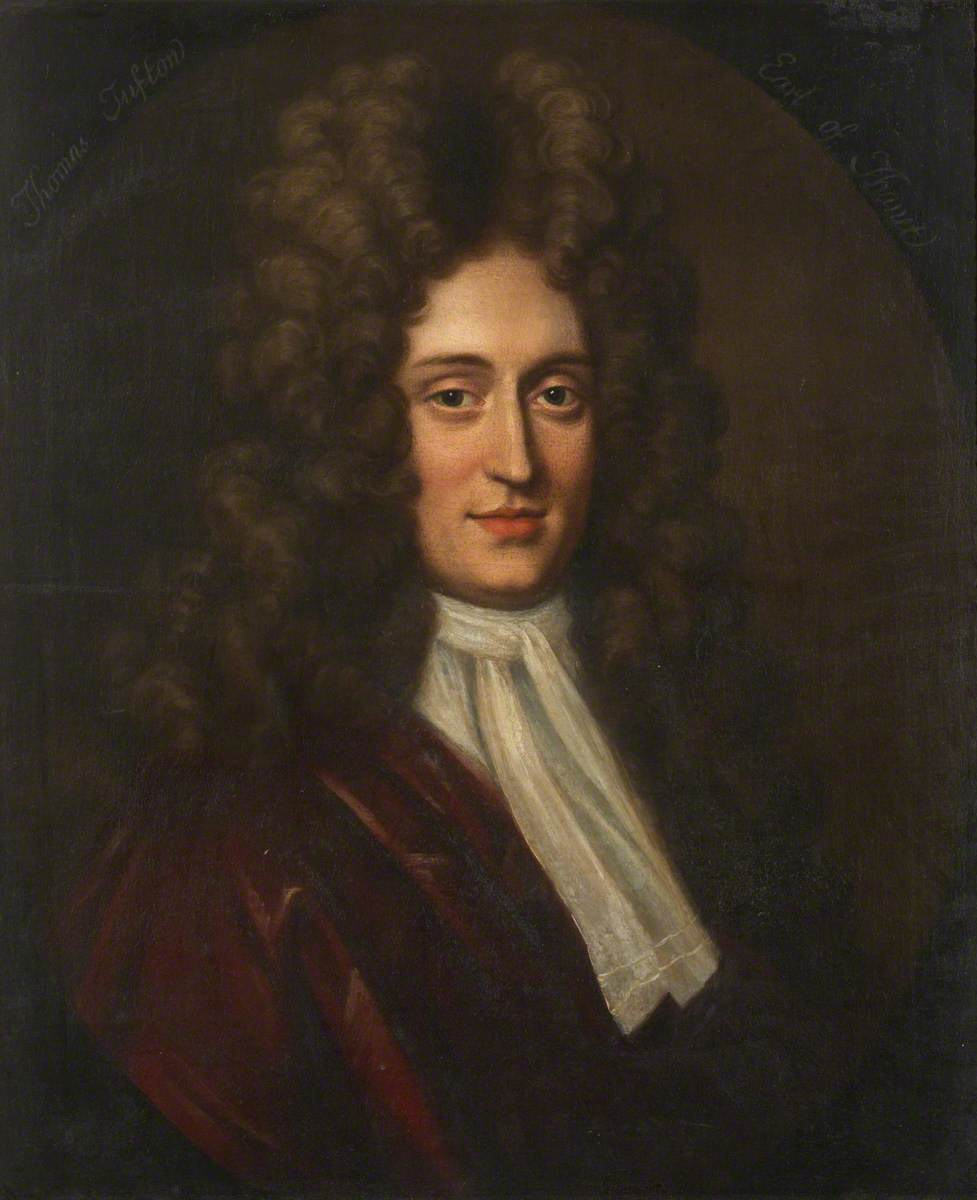

Member of the English Parliament for Appleby
- In office 1668–1679 Serving with John Dalston
- Preceded by: John Lowther; John Dalston
- Succeeded by: Richard Tufton; Anthony Lowther

Personal details
- Born: 30 August 1644
- Died: 30 July 1729 (aged 84)
- Party: Tories
- Spouse: Lady Catharine Cavendish (m. 1684; died 1712)
- Children: Anne Cecil, Countess of Salisbury; Margaret Coke, Countess of Leicester
- Parents: John Tufton, 2nd Earl of Thanet (father); Lady Margaret Sackville (mother)

Thomas Tufton, 6th Earl of Thanet, PC (30 August 1644 – 30 July 1729) was an English politician.

== Early life ==
He was the fourth son of John Tufton, 2nd Earl of Thanet and his wife Lady Margaret Sackville, Baroness Clifford and inherited the title on the death in 1684 of his elder brother Richard Tufton, 5th Earl of Thanet. Through his maternal grandmother, he was heir to the Barony de Clifford and to vast estates in Cumberland and Westmorland. He served as hereditary High Sheriff of Westmorland from 1684 to 1729.

== Career ==
He gained the rank of captain in a troop of horse. He held the office of Member of Parliament (M.P.) for Appleby between 1668 and 1679. He succeeded to the title of 6th Earl of the Isle of Thanet, co. Kent [E., 1628] on 27 April 1680. He gained the rank of colonel in 1685 in the service of the Regiment of Horse (5th Horse). He held the office of Lord Lieutenant of Westmorland between 1685 and 1687. He held the office of Lord Lieutenant of Cumberland between 1685 and 1687. He succeeded to the title of 18th Lord Clifford [E., 1299] on 12 December 1691, resolved by the House of Lords. He was invested as a Privy Counsellor (P.C.) from 1703 to 1707 and 1711 to 1714. He held the office of Lord-Lieutenant of Cumberland between 1712 and 1714.

In 1703, he was sworn a Privy Counsellor. A country gentleman and a Tory, he was noted by Swift for his "piety and charity".

== Personal life ==
On 14 August 1684, he married Lady Catharine Cavendish (d. 1712), daughter of Henry Cavendish, 2nd Duke of Newcastle. They had three sons, who all died in infancy, and five daughters:

- John Tufton, Lord Tufton (1686–1686), who died young.
- Thomas Tufton, Lord Tufton (1690–1690), who died young.
- John Tufton, Lord Tufton (1691–1691), who died young.
- Lady Catherine Tufton (1692–1734), who married Edward Watson, Viscount Sondes, in 1709.
- Lady Anne Tufton (d. 1757), who married James Cecil, 5th Earl of Salisbury in 1709.
- Lady Margaret Tufton (1700–1775), who married Thomas Coke, 1st Earl of Leicester, in 1718.
- Lady Isabella Tufton (1700–1764), who married Lord Nassau Powlett in 1731. After his death in 1741, she married Sir Francis Blake Delaval.
- Lady Mary Tufton (1701–1785), who married Anthony Grey, Earl of Harold. After his death in 1723, she married John Leveson-Gower, 1st Earl Gower, in 1736.

On his death, his title passed to his nephew Sackville Tufton, 7th Earl of Thanet, son of his younger brother Sackville. The barony of Clifford again fell into abeyance until 1734.

=== Coat of arms ===
Coat of arms of Thomas Tufton, 6th Earl of Thanet
Coronet A Coronet of an Earl Crest A Sea Lion sejant Argent. Escutcheon Sable an Eagle displayed Ermine within a Bordure Argent. Supporters On either side an Eagle Ermine. Motto Ales Volat Propriis (The bird flies to its own)

Parliament of England
Preceded by John Lowther; John Dalston	Member of Parliament for Appleby; 1668–1679; With: John Dalston	Succeeded by Richard Tufton; Anthony Lowther
Honorary titles
Preceded by The Earl of Thanet	High Sheriff of Westmorland; 1684–1729	Succeeded by The Earl of Thanet
Preceded by The Earl of Carlisle	Lord Lieutenant of Cumberland and Westmorland; 1685–1687	Succeeded by The Viscount Preston
Preceded by The Earl of Carlisle	Custos Rotulorum of Cumberland; 1685–1689	Succeeded by Sir John Lowther, Bt
Preceded by The Lord Wharton	Custos Rotulorum of Westmorland; 1702–1706	Succeeded by The Earl of Wharton
Preceded by The Earl of Wharton	Custos Rotulorum of Westmorland; 1714	Succeeded by The Earl of Wharton
Preceded by The Earl of Carlisle	Custos Rotulorum of Cumberland; 1714–1715	Succeeded by The Earl of Carlisle
Peerage of England
Preceded by Richard Tufton	Earl of Thanet; 1684–1729	Succeeded by Sackville Tufton
Preceded by Richard Tufton	Baron de Clifford; 1684–1729	Vacant Title next held by Margaret Coke
