= Duke Street, Liverpool =

Road in Liverpool, England

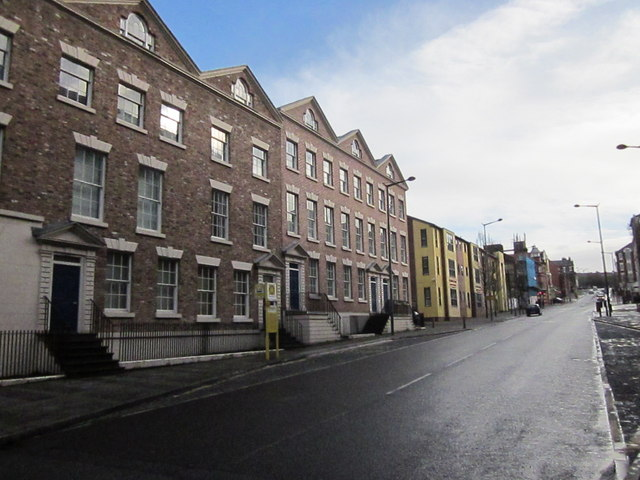
- Duke Street in 2012

- Location within Liverpool
- Location: Liverpool city centre
- Postal code: L1
- Coordinates: 53.4014°N 2.9832°W

Other
- Known for: Offices, shops, pubs, restaurants

Duke Street is a road in Liverpool, England. Situated in the city centre, it runs between Hanover Street and Upper Duke Street and is part of Liverpool's Ropewalks district.

== History ==
Duke Street is believed to take its name from the Duke of Cumberland, marking his victories at battles such as Culloden. The street was first set out in the 1720s, containing merchant's businesses and their homes, often above their commercial premises. The street's growth was largely fueled by the opening of the Old Dock in 1709.

In 1827, construction began on a cemetery, known as St James'. Duke Street became home to Liverpool's first public library, which opened in 1852.

=== Chinatown ===
Liverpool is home to the oldest Chinese community in Europe, thanks to its status as an important port in the 1800s. Duke Street falls within the Chinatown area, and even has road signs stating the street's name in Chinese (公爵街), to denote its historical importance.

=== Ropewalks ===
Duke Street forms part of Liverpool's Ropewalks district, an area where rope for shipping was manufactured. This business dominated the area up until the 19th century.

== Buildings ==
The Scandinavian Hotel, which was originally built for visiting sailors from Scandinavia has sat on Duke Street since the early 1800s.

The Union Newsroom was built by John Foster Sr. in the early 1800s, becoming home to Liverpool's first library in 1852. Before then, the building had held the Earl of Derby's natural history collections.

The Casartelli Building dated from 1760 and was built for an Italian family of scientific instrument manufacturers. No longer standing, a new building exists on the site, with its facade built using materials from the original building.

Dukes Terrace exists just off Duke Street, and is a Grade II listed building consisting of nine terraced houses. It was originally built for housing employees of some of the local merchants.

City of Liverpool College has a campus located on Duke Street, offering courses on baking and confectionery, tourism, makeup and beauty and English.

== Notable people ==
Poet Felicia Hemans, who was famous for her work Casabianca, was born on Duke Street, and spent her early life both living in Wales and on Duke Street.

John Bellingham, the assassin of British Prime Minister Spencer Perceval, was a merchant who lived in Duke Street for part of his life.

Welsh Liberal Party politician Samuel Holland was born on Duke Street in 1803.
