= Richard Lowther, 2nd Viscount Lonsdale =

English nobleman

Richard Lowther, 2nd Viscount Lonsdale (1692 – 1 December 1713) was an English nobleman, the eldest son of John Lowther, 1st Viscount Lonsdale and Katherine Thynne.

He succeeded his father at the age of eight, but died in 1713 a few months after reaching his majority.

Peerage of England
Preceded by John Lowther	Viscount Lonsdale; 1700–1713	Succeeded by Henry Lowther
