= Judge Lord =

Judge Lord may refer to:

- John W. Lord Jr. (1901–1972), judge of the United States District Court for the Eastern District of Pennsylvania
- Joseph Simon Lord III (1912–1991), judge of the United States District Court for the Eastern District of Pennsylvania
- Miles Lord (1919–2016), judge of the United States District Court for the District of Minnesota

== See also ==
- Justice Lord (disambiguation)
