= Henry Lowther, 3rd Viscount Lonsdale =

English courtier and landowner

Henry Lowther, 3rd Viscount Lonsdale, PC, FRS (1694 – 7 March 1751) was an English courtier and landowner.

== Life ==
He was a son of John Lowther, 1st Viscount Lonsdale and Katherine Thynne.

He succeeded to the Viscountcy in 1713, upon the death of his elder brother, Richard Lowther, 2nd Viscount Lonsdale. During the 1715 rising, he and the Lord Lieutenant of Cumberland, the Earl of Carlisle, assembled the Cumberland and Westmorland militia at Penrith's Beacon Fell with the posse comitatus, but the citizen army disintegrated upon the approach of the Earl of Derwentwater's troops. Lonsdale found twenty of his servants the only persons faithful to him, and was compelled to retire to Appleby Castle.

His brave, if futile conduct, won admiration. He was appointed a Lord of the Bedchamber to George I on 19 July 1717. He held the post for ten years, although he much preferred country life to that of London. He was sworn of the Privy Council and appointed Constable of the Tower of London in 1726, but he resigned the constableship in 1731, also because of his desire to live in the country. During this period, Lowther Hall was badly damaged by fire in 1718, and he spent little time there. In 1720, during the collapse of the South Sea Bubble, he may have lost as much as £30,000, worsening the condition of an estate already weakened by his gambling at cards and on the turf. He also spent significant sums to secure the burgage tenures of Appleby, bringing that borough under the family's control.

Appointed Lord Lieutenant of Cumberland and Westmorland in 1738, he was, by virtue of that office, responsible for the defense of those counties during the Rising of '45. However, he remained at his sister Elizabeth's house at Byram, Yorkshire during that period, Lowther Hall being uninhabitable due to alterations, and left military affairs largely in the hands of Sir George Fleming, Bt, Bishop of Carlisle. He died at Byram on 7 March 1751 and was buried on 18 March at Lowther Hall. The viscountcy became extinct on his death; his baronetcy and estates went to his second cousin James.

Political offices
Preceded by The Duke of Devonshire	Lord Privy Seal; 1733–1735	Succeeded by The Earl of Godolphin
Honorary titles
Preceded by The Duke of Bolton	Constable of the Tower of London; Lord Lieutenant of the Tower Hamlets; 1726–1731	Succeeded by The Earl of Leicester
Preceded by The Marquess of Wharton	Custos Rotulorum of Westmorland; 1715–1751	Vacant Title next held by Sir William Lowther, Bt
Preceded by The Earl of Carlisle	Lord Lieutenant and Custos Rotulorum of Cumberland; 1738–1751	Succeeded by The Earl of Egremont
Preceded by The Earl of Carlisle	Lord Lieutenant of Westmorland; 1738–1751	Vacant Title next held by Sir William Lowther, Bt
Peerage of England
Preceded by Richard Lowther	Viscount Lonsdale; 1713–1751	Extinct
Baronetage of Nova Scotia
Preceded by Richard Lowther	Baronet (of Lowther); 1713–1751	Succeeded by James Lowther
