= Justice Lord =

Justice Lord may refer to:

- Otis Lord (1812–1884), associate justice of the Massachusetts Supreme Judicial Court
- William Paine Lord (1838–1911), associate justice of the Oregon Supreme Court

== See also ==
- Justice Lords, a DC Comics supervillain team
- Lord Justice (disambiguation)
- Judge Lord (disambiguation)
