= Sir Christopher Musgrave, 4th Baronet =

English landowner and politician

Sir Christopher Musgrave, 4th Baronet (c. 1632 – 29 July 1704) was an English landowner and politician who sat in the House of Commons from 1661 to 1704, and briefly became Father of the House in 1704 as the member with the longest unbroken service.

== Biography ==
Musgrave was the son of Sir Philip Musgrave, 2nd Baronet of Edenhall and his wife Julia Hutton daughter of Sir Richard Hutton of Goldsborough, Yorkshire. He matriculated at Queen's College, Oxford on 10 July 1651 and was awarded his B.A. on the same date. He was a student of Gray's Inn in 1654. As a young man, he was active in the Royal cause. He was captain of the Guards before 1661.

In 1661, Musgrave was elected Member of Parliament for Carlisle in the Cavalier Parliament. He was knighted in 1671 and was Mayor of Carlisle in 1672. In 1677 he was governor of Carlisle. He was re-elected MP for Carlisle in the two elections of 1679, in 1681 and in 1685 and was a Commissioner of the Ordnance from 1679 to 1681. He succeeded to the baronetcy on the death of his brother in about 1687.

In 1690 Musgrave was elected MP for Westmorland. He was elected MP for Appleby in 1695 and for Oxford University in 1698. In 1700 he was elected MP for Westmorland for a second time and in 1701 he was elected MP for Totnes. He was elected MP for Westmorland for the third time in 1702. In 1702 Queen Anne made him one of the four tellers of the Exchequer.

Musgrave died of apoplexy at the age of 72 at St. James', Westminster and was buried at Trinity Minories, London.

Musgrave married firstly on 31 May 1660 Mary Cogan, the eldest daughter of Sir Andrew Cogan, of East Greenwich, Kent. She died in childbirth at Carlisle Castle on 8 July 1664, aged 27 and was buried at St. Cuthbert's, Edenhall. He married secondly by licence, dated 16 April 1671 Elizabeth Francklyn daughter of Sir John Francklyn, of Willesden, Middlesex. She died on 11 April 1701, and was buried at Edenhall.

Parliament of England
Preceded by William Briscoe; Jeremiah Tolhurst	Member of Parliament for Carlisle; 1661–1690; With: Sir Philip Howard; Viscount Morpeth; James Grahme; Jeremiah Bubb	Succeeded by Jeremiah Bubb; Christopher Musgrave
Preceded by Sir John Lowther; Goodwin Wharton	Member of Parliament for Westmorland; 1690–1695; With: Sir John Lowther	Succeeded by Sir John Lowther; Sir Richard Sandford
Preceded by William Cheyne; Sir John Walter	Member of Parliament for Appleby; 1695–1698; With: Sir William Twysden; Sir John Walter	Succeeded by Sir John Walter; Gervase Pierrepont
Preceded by Heneage Finch; Sir William Trumbull	Member of Parliament for Oxford University; 1698–1700; With: Sir William Glynne, 2nd Baronet	Succeeded by Heneage Finch; William Bromley
Preceded by Sir Richard Sandford; William Fleming	Member of Parliament for Westmorland; 1700–1701; With: Henry Graham	Succeeded by Henry Graham; Sir Richard Sandford
Preceded by Thomas Coulson; Francis Gwyn	Member of Parliament for Totnes; 1701–1702; With: Thomas Coulson	Succeeded by Thomas Coulson; William Seymour
Preceded by Henry Graham; Sir Richard Sandford	Member of Parliament for Westmorland; 1702–1704; With: Henry Graham	Succeeded by Henry Graham; William Fleming
Preceded by Thomas Turgis	Father of the House; 1704	Succeeded by Thomas Strangways
Military offices
Preceded by George Legge	Lieutenant-General of the Ordnance; 1682–1687	Succeeded by Sir Henry Tichborne
Baronetage of England
Preceded by Richard Musgrave	Baronet (of Hartley Castle); 1687–1704	Succeeded by Christopher Musgrave
