= Paul Wilson, Baron Wilson of High Wray =

Paul Norman Wilson, Baron Wilson of High Wray OBE DSC KStJ (24 October 1908 – 24 February 1980) was a British engineer, Lord Lieutenant of Westmorland (1965 to 1974) and of Cumbria (1974 to 1980) and Governor of the BBC.

== Early life ==
Wilson was the youngest son of Norman Forster Wilson, of Kendal, Westmorland, and of Mrs H. G. M. Wilson (née Harris). His two elder siblings were Gilbert, an academic geologist, and Edward, a scholar of Spanish. Wilson was educated at Gresham's School, Holt, and Clare College, Cambridge.

== Career ==
Wilson began his career as an engineer in South Africa, working there between 1930 and 1934. He then joined Gilbert Gilkes & Gordon Ltd, water turbine manufacturers, as managing director, in his home town of Kendal. He served the Second World War of 1939–1945 with the Royal Naval Volunteer Reserve, most of that time being spent at sea in capital ships. He was awarded the Distinguished Service Cross and retired as a temporary Lieutenant-Commander, to return to Gilbert Gilkes & Gordon. He was chairman of the company from 1954 to 1978.

In 1950 and 1951, he stood as Labour Party General Election candidate for his home constituency of Westmorland but lost on both occasions.

In public life, Wilson became a justice of the peace in 1958 and a Deputy Lieutenant for Westmorland in 1964, later DL for Cumberland and Westmorland, and Lord Lieutenant of the newly created county of Cumbria, 1974 to 1980. He was a Governor of the BBC from 1968 to 1972, governor of Sedbergh School, 1965–1974, and chairman of governors of Kendal College of Further Education, 1958–1974. He served as chairman of the Kendal & District Local Employment Committee (1954–1969), a member of the Westmoreland Youth Employment Committee (1946–1969) and of the National Youth Employment Council (1959 to 1969). A member of the Advisory Council of the Science Museum, 1968–1972 and 1973–1978, he was also Chairman of the Fund for the Preservation of Technological and Scientific Material, 1973–1978. Chairman of Trustees and Governors of the Lake District Museum Trust, 1968–1978.

== Honours ==
- Distinguished Service Cross, 1945
- Officer of the Order of the British Empire, 1959
- Lord Lieutenant of Westmorland, 1965 to 1974
- Knight of the Venerable Order of Saint John, 1966
- Lord Lieutenant of Cumbria, 1974 to 1980
- Created a life peer with the title Baron Wilson of High Wray, of Kendal in the County of Cumbria on 3 February 1976
- President of the Newcomen Society, 1973–1975 (and vice-president, 1968–1973 and 1975–1977)
- Patron of the Cumberland & Westmorland Antiquarian and Archaeological Society, 1965 (President, 1975–1978)
- Deputy Chairman of the British Hydromechanics Research Association, 1973–1975

== Major publications ==
- Watermills, an introduction (1956, 2nd edn 1973)
- Watermills with Horizontal Wheels (1960)
- Water Turbines (Science Museum, 1974)
- Water and other forms of Motive Power in History of Technology, 1900–1950 (1977)

Honorary titles
Preceded by Henry Hornyold-Strickland	Lord Lieutenant of Westmorland; 1965–1974	Office abolished
New office	Lord Lieutenant of Cumbria; 1974–1980; With: John Charles Wade	Succeeded by John Charles Wade
