= Corinne Bennett =

English conservation architect

Corinne Bennett MBE
- Bennett in 2010
- Born: Corinne Marie Wilson; 3 March 1935; London, England
- Died: 10 July 2010 (aged 75)
- Education: University College London
- Occupation: Architect
- Spouse: Keith Bennett
- Awards: MBE
- Practice: Purcell Miller Tritton, National Trust for Places of Historic Interest or Natural Beauty

Corinne Marie Gillian Bennett MBE (3 March 1935 – 10 July 2010) was an English conservation architect. She worked on the restoration and preservation of many historic buildings in England throughout her career, including Winchester Cathedral and the Royal Pavilion. She worked for the National Trust in the 1980s and became the first national cathedrals architect for English Heritage in 1991.

== Early life ==
Bennett was born Corinne Marie Wilson in London in 1935. Her father Gilbert was a professor of geology at Imperial College London and her mother Lucile was French Canadian. She was evacuated with her mother and younger brother to Montreal during World War II, and returned to England in 1944. She attended the Sacred Heart convent school in Hove. She had decided by the age of 12 to pursue a career in the preservation and repair of historic monuments and buildings, and a male teacher was specially hired by the convent to conduct drawing lessons for Bennett. She attended University College London's Bartlett School of Architecture from 1952 to 1957.

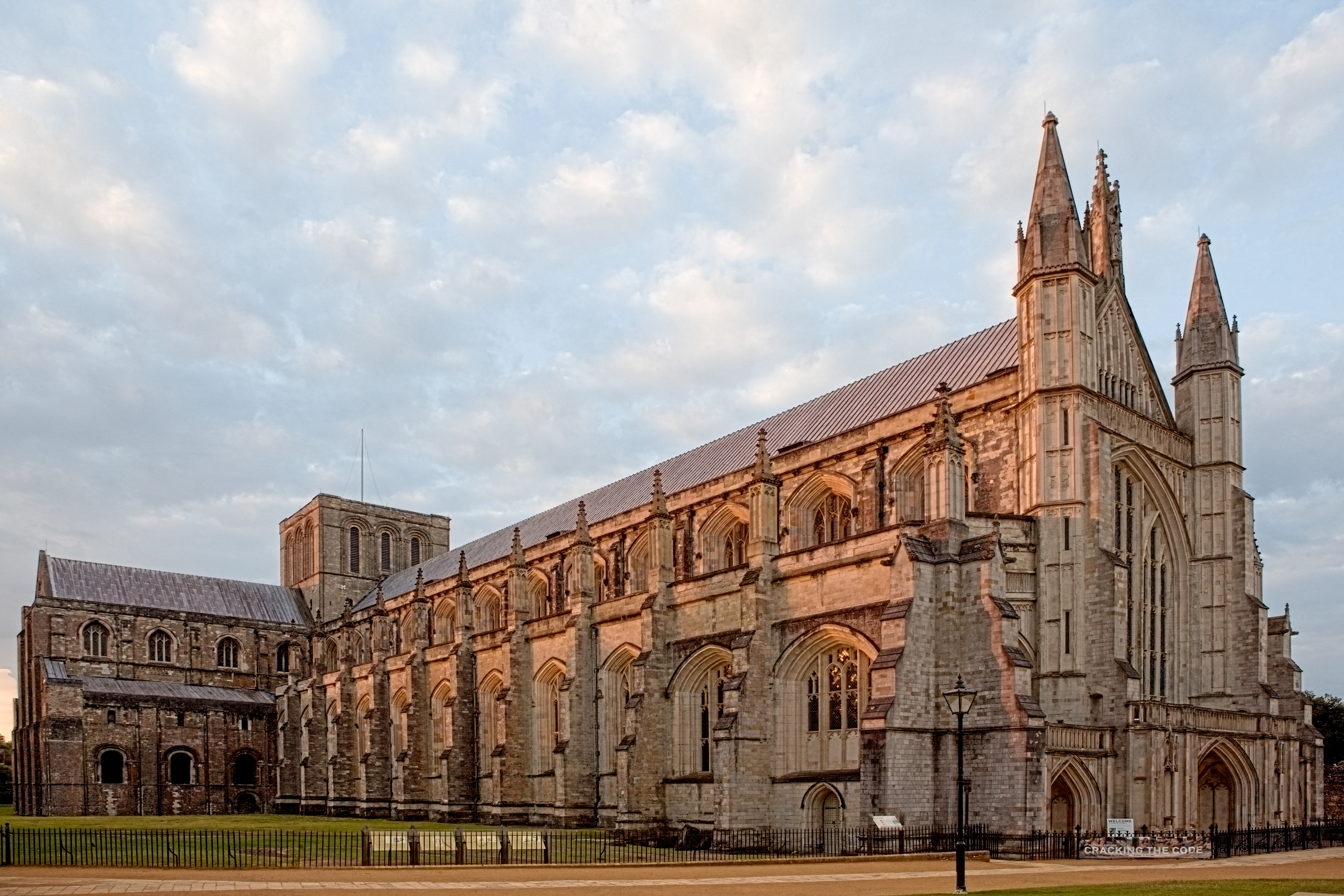
Winchester Cathedral, Winchester: Bennett oversaw a 15-year restoration programme beginning in 1974

== Career ==
After qualifying as an architect, Bennett worked for Powell & Moya, the practice of Philip Powell and Hidalgo Moya, before starting to work with historic buildings. She worked briefly for London County Council before taking up a role at the Ministry of Public Building and Works in 1963. In this role, she undertook experiments on new stone cleaning techniques with the Building Research Establishment; under her guidance, the techniques were used at the Tower of London, the Jewel Tower, the Methodist Central Hall Westminster, Audley End House, Bolsover Castle, Holyrood Palace and the Sheldonian Theatre. Her particular interest in stone preservation was inspired by her geologist father.

Bennett began working for Purcell Miller Tritton in 1968, for whom she completed her first cathedral-repair project on Ely Cathedral. After she was made a senior partner at the Purcell Miller Tritton firm, she opened a branch office at Sevenoaks, Kent. In 1974 she commenced a 15-year-long project of restoration work on Winchester Cathedral, thereby becoming the first woman to be a consultant architect to an English cathedral.

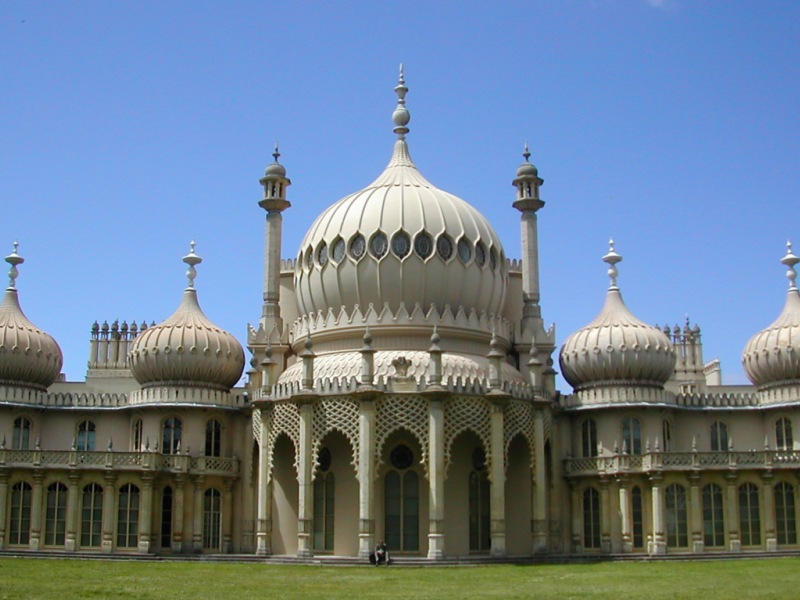
Royal Pavilion, Brighton: Bennett was responsible for repairs and alterations in 1980

In 1980 she was appointed consultant architect at the Royal Pavilion in Brighton, where she oversaw repairs and alterations. Throughout the 1980s she also oversaw preservation work on Wilton House, Ealing Abbey, Charleston Farmhouse and the ruins of Cowdray House. She concurrently worked for the National Trust on Mompesson House, Mottistone Manor, Mottisfont Abbey, Lacock Abbey and Alfriston Clergy House. She also reordered the chapels of the English College in Rome and St John's Seminary in Wonersh. In 1989 she co-founded the Hampshire and the Islands Historic Churches Trust.

In 1991 Bennett joined English Heritage as the national cathedrals architect—the first person to hold the position—and retired from most of her other duties. She was also the representative for English Heritage on the Cathedrals Fabric Commission from 1996 to 2006. Other committees in which she was involved in her later career included the fabric committees at St George's Cathedral, Southwark, and Chichester Cathedral, and the art and architecture committee of Westminster Cathedral.

Bennett was made an MBE in 1988 for her repair work on various churches throughout Kent. She was made a fellow of the Society of Antiquaries of London in 1997 and became a member of the Order of the Holy Sepulchre in 1979, eventually being appointed dame commander.

== Personal life ==
Bennett was a Roman Catholic. She married Keith Bennett, another conservation architect, in 1979. She and her husband were frequent visitors to Corsica and were the only English members of the island's historical organisation, Fédération d'Associations et Groupements pour les Etudes Corses. They lived for most of their married life in the village of Michelmersh and later moved to Brighton and Hove.

She died on 10 July 2010.
