= Goodwin Wharton =

English Whig politician and autobiographer

- Goodwin Wharton, c. 1694; from an oil painting attributed to Godfrey Kneller

Personal details
- Born: 8 March 1653
- Died: 28 October 1704 (aged 51)
- Party: Whigs
- Occupation: Politician, autobiographer

Goodwin Wharton (8 March 1653 – 28 October 1704) was an English Whig politician and autobiographer, as well as an avid mystic, alchemist and treasure hunter. His unpublished manuscript autobiography, in the British Library, "ranks high in the annals of psychopathology" according to the historian Roy Porter.

== Early life ==
Goodwin Wharton was the third and youngest son out of the seven children of Philip Wharton, 4th Baron Wharton and Jane Goodwin, daughter and heiress of Arthur Goodwin (died 1643), of Upper Winchendon, Buckinghamshire. He was privately educated in France and attended a Protestant academy in Caen in 1663–64. In public and family life he was overshadowed by his forceful older brother, Thomas Wharton, 1st Marquess of Wharton and Malmesbury.

Elected a member of Parliament for East Grinstead in 1680, he made a hot-headed speech in favour of excluding the Duke of York (later James II) from the throne and had to go into hiding for a time.

== Fairies and visions ==
Wharton sent two expeditions to Tobermory to try to raise a galleon from the Spanish Armada wrecked there. Some of his singularly unsuccessful treasure-hunting was done on the advice of a lover, the self-professed medium Mary Parish, who claimed to have placed him in contact with fairies. The soldier-politician John Wildman also became fascinated by Parish's predictions in 1684.

In the following year, Wharton began to receive messages that ostensibly came directly from God and several of his angels. Many of these concerned the prospect of seducing a number of women, including his stepmother, Anne Carr Popham. He claimed to have had an affair with his sister-in-law, the poet Anne Wharton, in the early 1680s. He never married, but he was persuaded by Parish that Hezekiah Knowles, the son of an associate of hers, was his illegitimate son.

== Admiralty lord ==
Wharton's mental instability seems to have gone unnoticed outside his family circle, but he was out of favour under James II for his pronounced Whiggery, despite making representations to his consort, Mary of Modena (and fantasizing about having an affair with her). With the Glorious Revolution he rose to some eminence and was commissioned a lieutenant colonel of cavalry.

Wharton inherited Buckinghamshire estates on his father's death in 1696. He had been elected to Parliament again in 1690, and sat successively for Westmoreland, Malmesbury, Cockermouth, and the shire of Buckinghamshire until his death. He was one of the Lords Commissioners of the Admiralty in 1697–99. He suffered a stroke in 1698, which ended his public career.

Parliament of England
Preceded by Thomas Pelham; Sir Thomas Littleton, Bt	Member for East Grinstead; 1679–1681; With: William Jephson	Succeeded by Sir Cyril Wyche; Henry Powle
Preceded by Sir John Lowther, Bt; Henry Wharton	Member for Westmorland; 1689–1690; With: Sir John Lowther, Bt	Succeeded by Sir John Lowther, Bt; Sir Christopher Musgrave, Bt
Preceded by Thomas Tollemache; Charles Godfrey	Member for Malmesbury; 1690–1696; With: Sir James Long 1690–1692; George Booth 1692–1695; Craven Howard 1695–1696	Succeeded by Craven Howard; Sir Thomas Skipwith, Bt
Preceded by Sir Orlando Gee; Sir Wilfrid Lawson, Bt	Member for Cockermouth; 1695–1698; With: Sir Charles Gerard, Bt	Succeeded by William Seymour; George Fletcher
Preceded by The Viscount Newhaven; Henry Neale	Member for Buckinghamshire; 1698–1704; With: The Viscount Newhaven 1698–1701, 1702–1704; Robert Dormer 1701–1702	Succeeded by The Viscount Newhaven; Sir Richard Temple, Bt
