= John Lowther, 1st Viscount Lonsdale =

English politician (1655–1700)

The Right Honourable The Viscount Lonsdale PC FRS
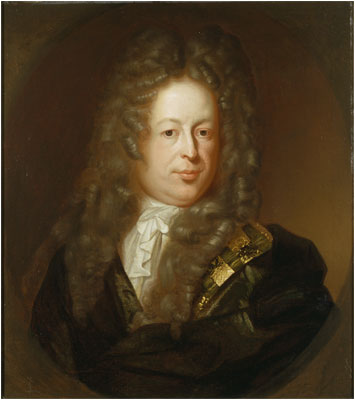
- Portrait of Viscount Lonsdale by Hyacinthe Rigaud

Lord Privy Seal
- In office 1699–1700
- Preceded by: The Earl of Pembroke and Montgomery
- Succeeded by: The Earl of Tankerville

Member of Parliament for Westmorland
- In office 1681–1696 Serving with Alan Bellingham, Henry Wharton, Goodwin Wharton, Sir Christopher Musgrave, Sir Richard Sandford
- Preceded by: Alan Bellingham; Christopher Philipson
- Succeeded by: Sir Richard Sandford; William Fleming
- In office 1677–1679 Serving with Sir Philip Musgrave, Alan Bellingham
- Preceded by: Sir Philip Musgrave; Sir Thomas Strickland
- Succeeded by: Alan Bellingham; Christopher Philipson

Vice-Chamberlain of the Household
- In office 1689–1694
- Preceded by: James Porter
- Succeeded by: Peregrine Bertie

First Lord of the Treasury
- In office March 1690 – November 1690
- Preceded by: The Earl of Monmouth
- Succeeded by: The Lord Godolphin

Personal details
- Born: John Lowther; 25 April 1655 Hackthorpe Hall, Lowther, Westmorland
- Died: 10 July 1700 (aged 45) Lowther, Westmorland
- Spouse: Lady Katherine Thynne (m. 1674)
- Relations: Sir John Lowther, 1st Baronet (grandfather); Sir Henry Bellingham, 1st Baronet (grandfather)
- Parent(s): John Lowther; Elizabeth Bellingham
- Education: Sedbergh School
- Alma mater: Queen's College, Oxford

John Lowther, 1st Viscount Lonsdale, PC FRS (25 April 1655 – 10 July 1700), known as Sir John Lowther, 2nd Baronet, from 1675 to 1696, was an English politician.

== Early life ==
He was born at Hackthorpe Hall, Lowther, Westmorland, the son of Col. John Lowther of Lowther (the eldest son of Sir John Lowther, 1st Baronet) and his wife, Elizabeth Bellingham, daughter of Sir Henry Bellingham, 1st Baronet, of Hilsington, Westmoreland.

He was educated at Sedbergh School before admission to Queen's College, Oxford, where he matriculated in 1670. He was admitted to the Inner Temple in 1671 and called to the Bar in 1677.

== Career ==
Prior to his creation as a viscount in 1696, Lowther had succeeded his grandfather as a baronet, and was twice member of parliament for Westmorland between 1677 and 1696. In 1688 he was serviceable in securing Cumberland and Westmorland for King William III, and was appointed to the Privy Council in 1689. In 1690, he was first lord of the treasury, and he was Lord Privy Seal from March 1699 until his death. He was badly injured in a duel in 1691.

Lonsdale wrote in 1688 a brief account of events from the accession of James II to the landing of the Prince of Orange at Torbay, which was later printed as Memoirs of the Reign of James II (in 1808, for private circulation) and again in 1857. The Memoirs reveal no more of Lonsdale's part in events than his public utterances.

== Personal life ==
On 3 December 1674, he married Lady Katherine Thynne (1653–1712/3), sister of Thomas Thynne, 1st Viscount Weymouth, and second daughter of Sir Henry Frederick Thynne, 1st Baronet and the former Hon. Mary Coventry (second daughter, by his second wife, of Thomas Coventry, 1st Baron Coventry). Together, they were the parents of:

- Richard Lowther, 2nd Viscount Lonsdale (1692–1713), who died a few months after reaching his majority in 1713.
- Henry Lowther, 3rd Viscount Lonsdale (1694–1751), who died unmarried in 1751.
- Hon. Mary Lowther (c. 1676–1706), who married Sir John Wentworth, 1st Baronet of North Elmsall in February 1692.
- Hon. Elizabeth Lowther, who married Sir William Ramsden, 2nd Baronet on 6 August 1695.
- Hon. Margaret Lowther (d. 1728), who married Sir Joseph Pennington, 2nd Baronet on 20 April 1706.
- Hon. Barbara Lowther (d. 1716), who married Thomas Howard of Corby (d. 1740), a direct descendant of Lord William Howard.
- Hon. Anthony Lowther (d. 1741)
- Hon. Jane Lowther (d. 1752), who died unmarried.

He died at Lowther on 10 July 1700 and was buried in Lowther churchyard. His wife Katherine Lowther took over his political influence and she was eventually buried at Lowther in 1713. The tomb is by William Stanton.

His branch of the Lowther family became extinct when his son Henry, the 3rd viscount, died unmarried in March 1751, and the baronetcy and estates went to his cousin, James Lowther, later the first Earl of Lonsdale.

Parliament of England
Preceded by Sir Philip Musgrave; Sir Thomas Strickland	Member of Parliament for Westmorland; 1677–1679; With: Sir Philip Musgrave 1677–1678; Alan Bellingham 1678–1679	Succeeded by Alan Bellingham; Christopher Philipson
Preceded by Alan Bellingham; Christopher Philipson	Member of Parliament for Westmorland; 1681–1696; With: Alan Bellingham 1681–1689; Henry Wharton 1689; Goodwin Wharton 1689–1690; Sir Christopher Musgrave 1690–1695; Sir Richard Sandford 1695–1696	Succeeded by Sir Richard Sandford; William Fleming
Political offices
Preceded by James Porter	Vice-Chamberlain of the Household; 1689–1694	Succeeded by Peregrine Bertie
Preceded by The Earl of Monmouth	First Lord of the Treasury; 1690	Succeeded by The Lord Godolphin
Preceded by The Earl of Pembroke and Montgomery	Lord Privy Seal; 1699–1700	Succeeded by The Earl of Tankerville
Honorary titles
Preceded by Sir Philip Musgrave, Bt	Custos Rotulorum of Westmorland; 1678–1700	Succeeded by The Lord Wharton
Preceded by The Earl of Carlisle	Vice-Admiral of Cumberland and Westmorland; 1686–1700	Vacant Title next held by Sir Richard Musgrave, Bt
Preceded by The Viscount Preston	Lord Lieutenant of Cumberland and Westmorland; 1689–1694	Succeeded by The Earl of Carlisle
Preceded by The Earl of Thanet	Custos Rotulorum of Cumberland; 1689–1700	Succeeded by The Earl of Carlisle
Peerage of England
New creation	Viscount Lonsdale; 1696–1700	Succeeded by Richard Lowther
Baronetage of Nova Scotia
Preceded by John Lowther	Baronet (of Lowther); 1675–1700	Succeeded by Richard Lowther
