= Custos Rotulorum of Cumberland =

This is a list of people who have served as Custos Rotulorum of Cumberland.

- Anthony Barwys bef. 1544 – aft. 1547
- Thomas Salkeld bef. 1558 – aft. 1562
- Sir Thomas Dacre bef. 1564–1566
- Henry Scrope, 9th Baron Scrope of Bolton bef. 1577–1592
- Thomas Scrope, 10th Baron Scrope of Bolton 1592 – aft. 1596
- Francis Clifford, 4th Earl of Cumberland bef. 1605–1641
- George Dalston 1641–1643
- Henry Howard, Lord Maltravers 1643–1652
- Interregnum
- Charles Howard, 1st Earl of Carlisle 1660–1685
- Thomas Tufton, 6th Earl of Thanet 1685–1689
- John Lowther, 1st Viscount Lonsdale 1689–1700
- Charles Howard, 3rd Earl of Carlisle 1700–1714
- Thomas Tufton, 6th Earl of Thanet 1714–1715
- Charles Howard, 3rd Earl of Carlisle 1715–1738
- Henry Lowther, 3rd Viscount Lonsdale 1738–1751
- Charles Wyndham, 2nd Earl of Egremont 1751–1763
- vacant
- James Lowther, 1st Earl of Lonsdale 1765–1802

For later custodes rotulorum, see Lord Lieutenant of Cumberland.
