= Wentworth baronets of North Elmsal (1692) =

Escutcheon of the Wentworth baronets of North Elmsal

The Wentworth baronetcy, of North Elmsal in the County of York, was created in the Baronetage of England on 28 July 1692 for the landowner John Wentworth. He married that year Mary Lowther, daughter of John Lowther, 1st Viscount Lonsdale.

The title became extinct on the death of the 2nd Baronet in 1741.

== Wentworth baronets, of North Elmsal (1692) ==
- Sir John Wentworth, 1st Baronet (1673–1720)
- Sir Butler Cavendish Wentworth, 2nd Baronet (c. 1710–1741)
