= Gilbert Wilson (geologist) =

British geologist (1899–1986)

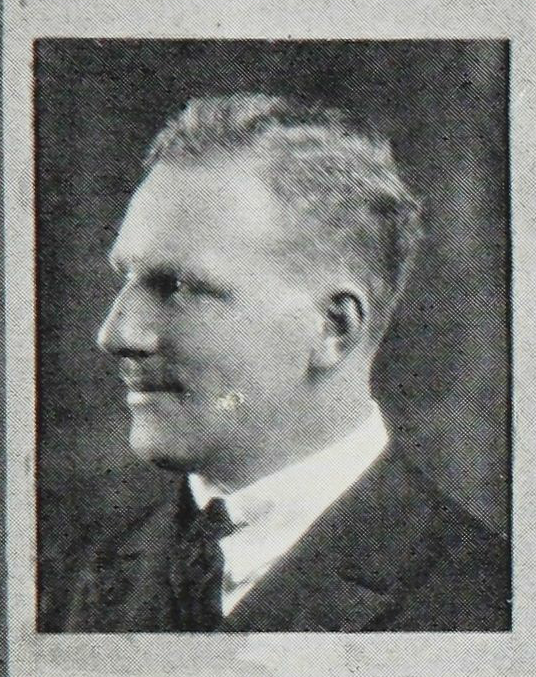
- Gilbert Wilson, Old McGill Yearbook, 1925
- Born: 5 March 1899; Kendal, England
- Died: 27 July 1986 (aged 87)
- Education: McGill University (BSc); University of Wisconsin-Madison (MSc); Imperial College, London (PhD)
- Awards: Murchison Medal (1968)
- Scientific career
- Fields: Structural geology
- Workplaces: Imperial College, London
- Doctoral students: John G. Ramsay, Neville J. Price

Gilbert Wilson (5 March 1899 – 27 July 1986) was a British structural geologist, who was best known for his work on small-scale geological structures. He was awarded the Murchison Medal of the Geological Society of London in 1968.

== Early life ==
Wilson was born in Kendal, in the English Lake District, on 5 March 1899. He was the eldest son of civil engineer Norman Foster Wilson (1869–1948) and Henrietta Gwendolen Meryon, née Harris (b. 1876). His younger brothers were Paul Wilson (1908–1980), who was later a mechanical engineer and life peer, and Edward Wilson (1906–1977), who was later a Spanish scholar.

Wilson first went to school in Windermere, where he was the youngest of five boys called 'Wilson', so was known as Wilson 'Quintus'. Later, Wilson was educated at Gresham's School, in Norfolk. After completing his schooling, Wilson spent two years serving with the Tank Corps in France and Germany in 1918 and 1919. After the end of the war, Wilson went to McGill University, Montreal, Canada, to study for a degree in mining engineering and geology. In the McGill yearbook for 1924, Wilson identified his hobbies as "Tea, beer and mountains"; his love of mountains extended to some first ascents in the Purcell Mountains of British Columbia.

Wilson graduated in 1925, and his interest in structural geology next took him to the University of Wisconsin-Madison in the United States to study for a master's degree in geology. He worked with geologists Charles Leith and W.J. Mead, and learned new skills in identifying the 'way up' of ancient sedimentary rocks. As a student there, Wilson wrote a ‘theme song for structural geologists’ which he performed at the 1926 University of Wisconsin Geology Club Banquet, to the tune of Bonny Dundee. This was later reproduced in an issue of the Edinburgh Geological Society's magazine.

There are some rocks that flow while others get broke ...
The stress is a force that we never quite see
While the strain shows in such things as schistosity

Wilson graduated in 1926, and worked briefly in the mining industries in Canada, Yugoslavia, Russia and Africa, before heading to Imperial College, London, to study for a PhD. He completed his PhD in 1931. As a student, Gilbert became the first president of the Imperial College mountaineering club in 1929, and in 1930 led a group from the club across the Eiger and the Mönch in a day.

== Career ==
Wilson taught for a while at the University of Reading, and returned to Imperial College in 1939 as a lecturer in structural geology, teaching the concepts he had learned in Wisconsin. His lecturing style was engaging, and he has been described as a "supreme blackboard artist" since his blackboard drawings of geological features in coloured chalks were "works of art ... conveying the geometric concepts of structural geology". During the 1950s, Wilson's influence grew as he inspired new students to work in the discipline of structural geology. Wilson's reputation was built on his recognition that the small-scale deformational structures that could be seen in the field in isolated rocky outcrops, would themselves reflect the larger but not directly observable regional structures. Wilson is credited with having brought this idea back from Wisconsin, to Europe.

== Family ==
Wilson married Lucile Terroux in 1927, and they had a son, David (1938–2022) and a daughter, Corinne (1935–2010). Wilson died in July 1986, aged 87. As a part of his bequest, he left £1500 to the Geologists' Association.

== Awards and recognition ==
In 1953, Wilson was awarded the Lyell Fund of the Geological Society of London "for his works on structural geology ... and studies of granitization and coastal geomorphology". In 1968, he was awarded the Murchison Medal of the Geological Society of London.

Wilson was made an honorary member of the Geologists' Association in 1975, and was awarded the Andre Dumont medal of the Geological Society of Belgium.

== Selected works ==
Over the course of his career, Wilson published a number of research papers. He published a book during his retirement, which was based on a paper he had originally presented to the Geological Society of Belgium twenty years earlier. Reviewers commented that the book was 'too late ... to get its due recognition', and the poor quality of the photos could have been improved by a 'chimpanzee with a snapshot camera'.

=== Book ===
Wilson, Gilbert; Cosgrove, John W. (1982). Introduction to Small-Scale Geological Structures. George Allen & Unwin. ISBN 978-94-011-6840-3.

=== Selected papers ===
- Wilson, Gilbert (1946). "The relationship of slaty cleavage and kindred structures to tectonics". Proceedings of the Geologists' Association. 57 (4): 263–302. Bibcode:1946PrGA...57..263W. doi:10.1016/S0016-7878(46)80014-2.
- Wilson, Gilbert (1950). "The tectonics of the Tintagel area, North Cornwall". Quarterly Journal of the Geological Society. 106 (1–4): 393–432. Bibcode:1950QJGS..106..393W. doi:10.1144/GSL.JGS.1950.106.01-04.19.
- Wilson, Gilbert (1953). "Mullion and rodding structures in the Moine Series of Scotland". Proceedings of the Geologists' Association. 64 (2): 118–151. Bibcode:1953PrGA...64..118W. doi:10.1016/S0016-7878(53)80012-X.
- Wilson, Gilbert (1967). "The geometry of cylindrical and conical folds". Proceedings of the Geologists' Association. 78 (1): 179–209. Bibcode:1967PrGA...78..179W. doi:10.1016/S0016-7878(67)80043-9.
