= Lord Justice =

Lord Justice may refer to:

- A member of a collective regency in the temporary absence of the sovereign or viceroy:
  - Lords Justices of Ireland, in the absence of the chief governor
  - Under the Regency Acts until 1840, if the monarch died while the heir was abroad, Lords Justices would be appointed until the new monarch arrived.
  - Lords Justices appointed during the absence of King George I in 1719, when the king was in Hanover
- Style of various senior judges in Britain or Ireland
  - Lord Justice of Appeal in England and Wales (since 1875)
  - Lord Justice of Appeal in Ireland (1877–1924)
  - Lord Justice of Appeal in Northern Ireland (since 1921)
  - Lord Justice of Appeal in Chancery (1851–1875)
  - Lord Justice of Appeal in Chancery in Ireland (1856–1877)
  - Lord Justice Clerk second most senior judge in Scotland
  - Lord Justice General senior criminal judge in Scotland, since 1836 merged with Lord President of the Court of Session

== See also ==
- Lord Chief Justice (disambiguation)
- Lord Judge, style of Igor Judge, Baron Judge
- Lady Justice, an allegorical personification of the moral force in judicial systems
- Justice Lord (disambiguation)
