= Pickering baronets =

Extinct baronetcy in the Baronetage of England

There have been two baronetcies created for persons with the surname Pickering, one in the Baronetage of Nova Scotia and one in the Baronetage of England. Both creations are extinct.

The Pickering Baronetcy, of Titchmarsh in the County of Northampton, was created in the Baronetage of Nova Scotia on 5 June 1638 for Gilbert Pickering, subsequently a member of the English Council of State during the Protectorate of Oliver Cromwell. The third baronet sat as a Knight of the Shire for Leicestershire. The fourth baronet represented Mitchell in Parliament. The title became extinct on his death in 1749. John Pickering, brother of the first baronet, also fought as a Parliamentarian in the First English Civil War.

The Pickering Baronetcy, of Whaddon in the County of Cambridge, was created in the Baronetage of England on 2 January 1661 for Henry Pickering, Member of Parliament for Cambridgeshire. His son, the second baronet, represented Morpeth and Cambridge in Parliament. The title became extinct on the latter's death in 1705.

== Pickering baronets, of Titchmarsh (1638) ==
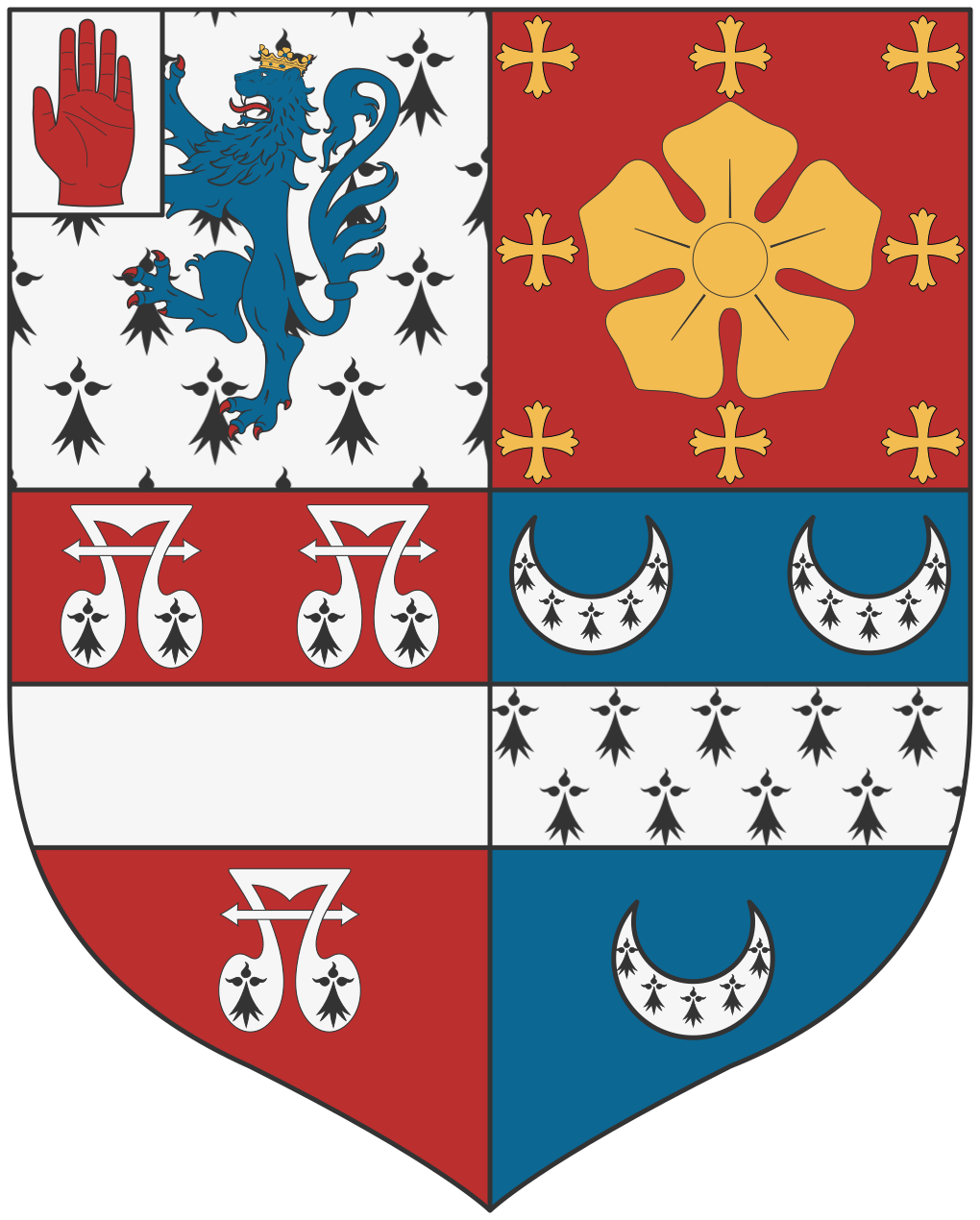
Pickering baronets of Titchmarsh.

- Sir Gilbert Pickering, 1st Baronet (c. 1611–1668)
- Sir John Pickering, 2nd Baronet (c. 1640–1703)
- Sir Gilbert Pickering, 3rd Baronet (c. 1669–1736)
- Sir Edward Pickering, 4th Baronet (c. 1715–1749)

== Pickering baronets, of Whaddon (1661) ==
Pickering baronets of Whaddon.

- Sir Henry Pickering, 1st Baronet (died 1668)
- Sir Henry Pickering, 2nd Baronet (c. 1655–1705)
