= Casartelli Building =

Building in Liverpool, Merseyside, England

Coordinates: 53.40265°N 2.98525°W

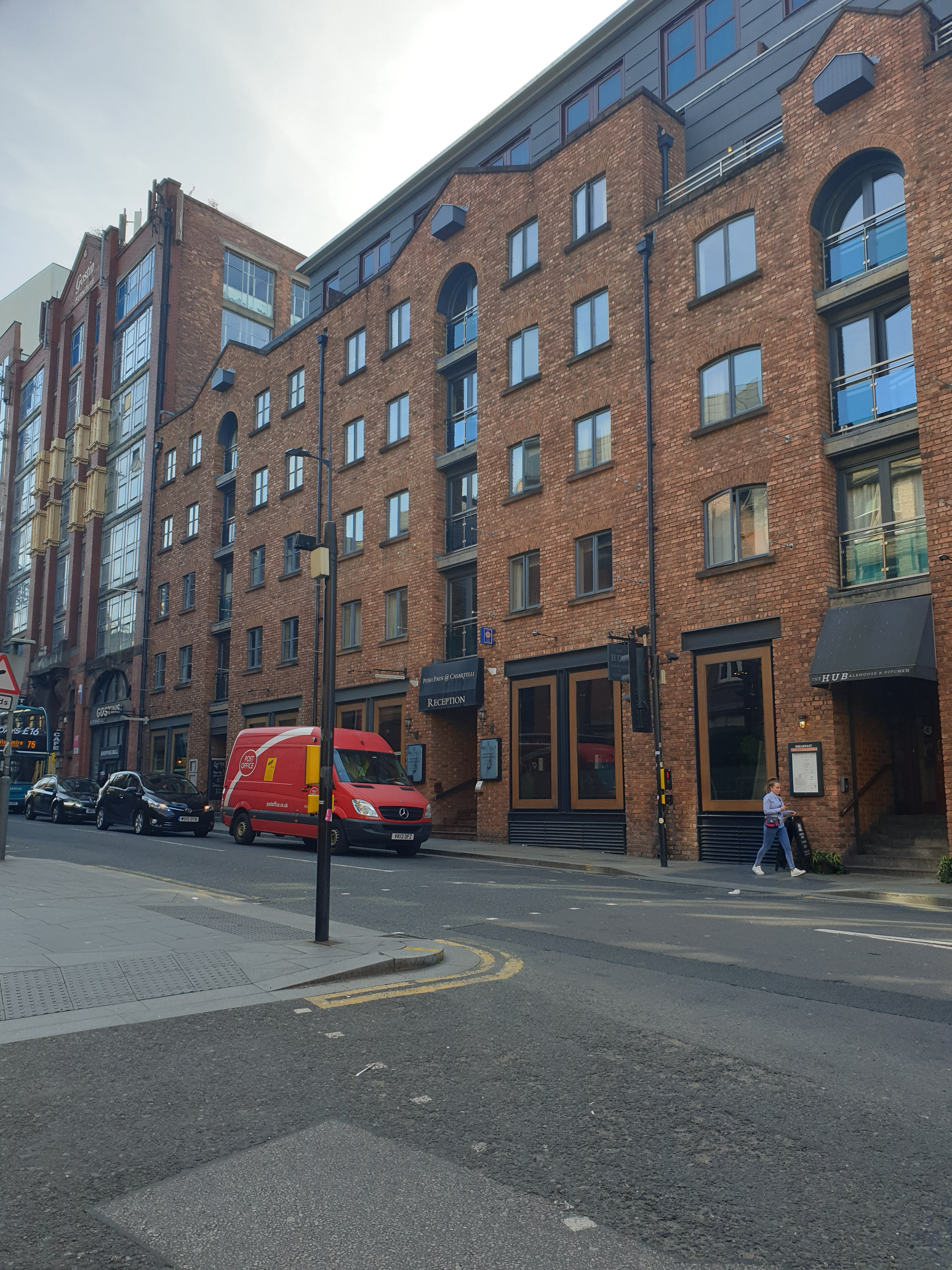
- Building
- Interactive map of the Casartelli Building area

General information
- Location: Liverpool, England
- Completed: 1760

The Casartelli Building, built in 1760, was a grade II* listed building at the meeting of Hanover Street and Duke Street, Liverpool, England. It has now been replaced with a replica.

== History ==
Its name comes from the Italian Casartelli family, who ran their scientific instrument manufacturing business from the site. It eventually became a wine warehouse before falling into disuse and disrepair.

By October 2000, the condition of the building was so poor that part of it collapsed, prompting the local newspaper, the Liverpool Echo, to launch the Stop the Rot conservation campaign, with the Casartelli Building as its symbol of architectural and cultural neglect in the city centre. After months of wrangling between the owners of the building, the Liverpool City Council and English Heritage, on plans for renovation and development of the site, in October 2001 the building was declared unsalvageable due to a rotten wooden beam at the ground floor, which would have required all of the above brickwork to be removed, and the building was dismantled.

== Rebuilding ==
In January 2002, it was announced that an exact replica of the original building was to be constructed on the site, using as many original materials as possible. Construction was completed and the building was officially opened in March 2007 as a successful 31-room apartment hotel called Posh Pads.
