= Stop the Rot =

Architectural conservation campaign based in Liverpool, England

'Stop the Rot' is a campaign launched in October 2000 by the Liverpool Echo newspaper with the aim of rescuing and preserving the rich architectural heritage of Liverpool and the greater Merseyside area. The campaign was launched when part of the Casartelli Building in Hanover Street in Liverpool collapsed, and this building subsequently became the symbol of the campaign.

The first meeting of the 'Stop the Rot' committee was held in April 2001 and at that stage there were 11 sites listed by the campaign as most at risk. The programme mobilised public support and received support from leaders of Liverpool City Council and from English Heritage, and as a result in October, with financial assistance from English Heritage, the council appointed a full-time Buildings at Risk officer.

Added impetus for the campaign was created by Liverpool being named as the 2008 European City of Culture and a wish for the city to present the best image possible for the expected influx of tourists and visitors.

In 2011 the Creative Ropeworks Project won an award from the Georgian Group for effective preservation of Georgian architecture and the 'Stop the Rot' campaign was highlighted as part of Liverpool's bid.

Currently 16 sites remain within the focus of the campaign and at risk. These are as follows:

- 64/72 Seel Street
- 98-102a High Street, Wavertree
- Buddleia Centre
- Cheapside, Liverpool
- St Luke's Church
- Duke Street Terraces
- Newsham Park Hospital
- Scandinavia Hotel
- Seel Street/Slater Street
- Stanley Dock Tobacco Warehouse
- Wellington Rooms
- Welsh Presbyterian Church
- White House Pub

== Sites formerly on the list ==
- Casartelli Building
- Fruit Exchange Building
- Fleet Street Warehouses
- St Peter's Catholic Church
- Stanley Buildings
- St Andrew's Church
- The Florence Institute for Boys
- Royal Insurance Building
