= Sir Philip Musgrave, 2nd Baronet =

English politician

Sir Philip Musgrave, 2nd Baronet (21 May 1607 – 7 February 1678) was an English politician who sat in the House of Commons of England from 1640 to 1643 and from 1661 to 1678. He served in the Royalist army in the Civil War.

== Biography ==
Musgrave was the son of Sir Richard Musgrave, who was MP for Westmorland, and his wife Frances Wharton, daughter of Philip Lord Wharton. The Musgrave family had been settled at Musgrave in Westmorland for many centuries. He inherited the baronetcy on the death of his father in 1615.

In April 1640, Musgrave was elected Member of Parliament for Westmorland in the Short Parliament. He was re-elected for Westmorland in November 1640 for the Long Parliament. He supported the King and was disabled from sitting in parliament in March 1643. Musgrave was Governor of Carlisle and fought for the King at the Battle of Marston Moor and the Battle of Worcester.

He was appointed the Governor of the Isle of Man by Charlotte Stanley, Countess of Derby during the Manx Rebellion of 1651.

After the Restoration, Musgrave was appointed Custos Rotulorum of Westmorland from 1660 until his death and was re-elected MP for Westmorland in 1661 for the Cavalier Parliament and sat until his death in 1678. Other offices received at this time were a joint deputy lieutenancy of Cumberland and Westmorland, a commission of the peace for Westmorland, and a militia colonelcy although his military leadership during the civil wars had been a failure. He was offered a peerage as Baron Musgrave, of Hartley Castle in the County of Westmorland, but did not take up the patent.

Musgrave died at Eden Hall at the age of 70.

Musgrave married Julia Hutton, daughter of Sir Richard Hutton of Goldsborough Hall, Yorkshire. He was succeeded in the baronetcy by his son Richard.

Parliament of England
Vacant Parliament suspended since 1629	Member of Parliament for Westmorland; 1640–1643; With: Sir Henry Bellingham	Succeeded by Henry Lawrence; Sir James Bellingham
Preceded by Sir John Lowther; Sir Thomas Wharton	Member of Parliament for Westmorland; 1661–1678; With: Sir Thomas Strickland 1661–77; Sir John Lowther 1677–79	Succeeded by Sir John Lowther; Alan Bellingham
Baronetage of England
Preceded by Richard Musgrave	Baronet (of Hartley Castle); 1615–1678	Succeeded by Richard Musgrave
