= Lord Lieutenant of Cumbria =

Representative of the British monarch in Cumbria

This is a list of those who have held the position of Lord Lieutenant of Cumbria. Cumbria was formed on 1 April 1974 by combining Cumberland and Westmorland, the area of Lancashire North of the Sands part of the Lonsdale Hundred and the former Sedbergh Rural District of the West Riding of Yorkshire.

== History ==
The position of Lord Lieutenant of Cumbria has existed since the creation of the non-metropolitan and ceremonial county of Cumbria in 1974 which saw the abolition of the former lieutenancies of Cumberland and Westmorland. As well as Cumberland and Westmorland Cumbria also includes former parts of Lancashire and the West Riding of Yorkshire.

The non-metropolitan county of Cumbria was abolished on 1 April 2023 and replaced with two unitary authorities known as Cumberland and Westmorland and Furness. The two new unitary authorities continue to constitute a ceremonial county named "Cumbria" for the purpose of lieutenancy and shrievalties, being presided over by a Lord Lieutenant of Cumbria and a High Sheriff of Cumbria.

== List of Lord Lieutenants of Cumbria ==
- John Charles Wade (formerly Lord Lieutenant of Cumberland) 1 April 1974 – with a lieutenant:
  - Lieutenant-Commander Paul Norman Wilson 1 April 1974 – 1980 (formerly Lord Lieutenant of Westmorland)
- Sir Charles Graham, 6th Baronet 1983–1994
- Sir James Anthony Cropper 18 July 1994–2012
- Claire Hensman December 2012–5 July 2023
- (Francis) Alexander Scott 6 July 2023–present

== See also ==
See Lord Lieutenant of Cumberland and Lord Lieutenant of Westmorland for Lord Lieutenants of those counties before 1974.
