= Sir Henry Pickering, 1st Baronet =

English politician

Sir Henry Pickering, 1st Baronet (died 4 March 1668) was an English landowner and politician who sat in the House of Commons in 1654. He fought in the Parliamentary army in the English Civil War.

== Biography ==
Pickering was the son of Rev. Henry Pickering DD, rector of Aldwinckle, Northamptonshire. In 1645 he was colonel of foot in the New Model Army. He purchased the estate of Whaddon in 1648 and was High Sheriff of Cambridgeshire and Huntingdonshire from 1648 to 1649. In 1654 he was elected Member of Parliament for Cambridgeshire in the First Protectorate Parliament. He was re-elected MP for Cambridgeshire in 1656 for the Second Protectorate Parliament. He was knighted by Oliver Cromwell at Whitehall on 1 February 1658. In 1659 he was re-elected MP for Cambridgeshire in the Third Protectorate Parliament. After the Restoration, he was created baronet by King Charles II on 2 January 1661.

Pickering died at Whaddon in 1668.

== Family ==
Pickering married Elizabeth Viner, daughter of Sir Thomas Viner, 1st Baronet and his first wife Anne Parsons, at Hackney on 19 July 1647. He was succeeded by his son Henry.

Parliament of England
Preceded by John Sadler; Thomas French; Robert Castle; Samuel Warner	Member of Parliament for Cambridgeshire; 1654–1659; With: John Delbrow 1654; Robert Castle 1654–1656; Francis Russell 1654–1656; Robert West 1656; Sir Thomas Willys, 1st Baronet 1659	Succeeded by Not represented in Restored Rump
Baronetage of England
New creation	Baronet (of Whaddon); 1661–1668	Succeeded by Henry Pickering
