= Sir Henry Pickering, 2nd Baronet =

English politician

Sir Henry Pickering, 2nd Baronet (c. 1656 – 7 May 1705) was an English politician who sat in the House of Commons from 1685 to 1689, and later settled in Barbados, where he played a prominent part in the island's government.

Pickering was the son of Sir Henry Pickering, 1st Baronet of Whaddon, Cambridgeshire, and his wife Elizabeth Viner, daughter of Sir Thomas Viner, 1st Baronet, and his first wife Anne Parsons. He was educated at Queens' College, Cambridge (1672) and the Inner Temple (1674). He succeeded his father in 1668, inheriting his Whaddon estate.

He was appointed High Sheriff of Cambridgeshire and Huntingdonshire for 1683–84 and deputy lieutenant for Cambridgeshire from 1685 to his death. He was a member of the Barbados assembly in 1693–94 and a member of the Barbados council from 1705 to his death.

Pickering was elected Member of Parliament (MP) for Morpeth in 1685 and sat until 1689. He sat later for Cambridge from 1698 until his death.

He married twice: firstly Philadelphia, the daughter of Sir George Downing, 1st Baronet of East Hatley, Cambridgeshire, with whom he had 3 daughters and secondly Grace, the daughter and coheiress of Constant Sylvester of Barbados. He died in Barbados in 1705 and was buried at Whaddon. His widow sold the Whaddon estate in 1716.

Parliament of England
Preceded by Sir George Downing; Daniel Collingwood	Member of Parliament for Morpeth; 1685–1689; With: Theophilus Oglethorpe	Succeeded by Charles Howard; Roger Fenwick
Baronetage of England
Preceded by Henry Pickering	Baronet (of Whaddon); 1668–1705	Extinct
