= Florence Institute =

Historic Grade building in Liverpool

The Florence Institute for Boys
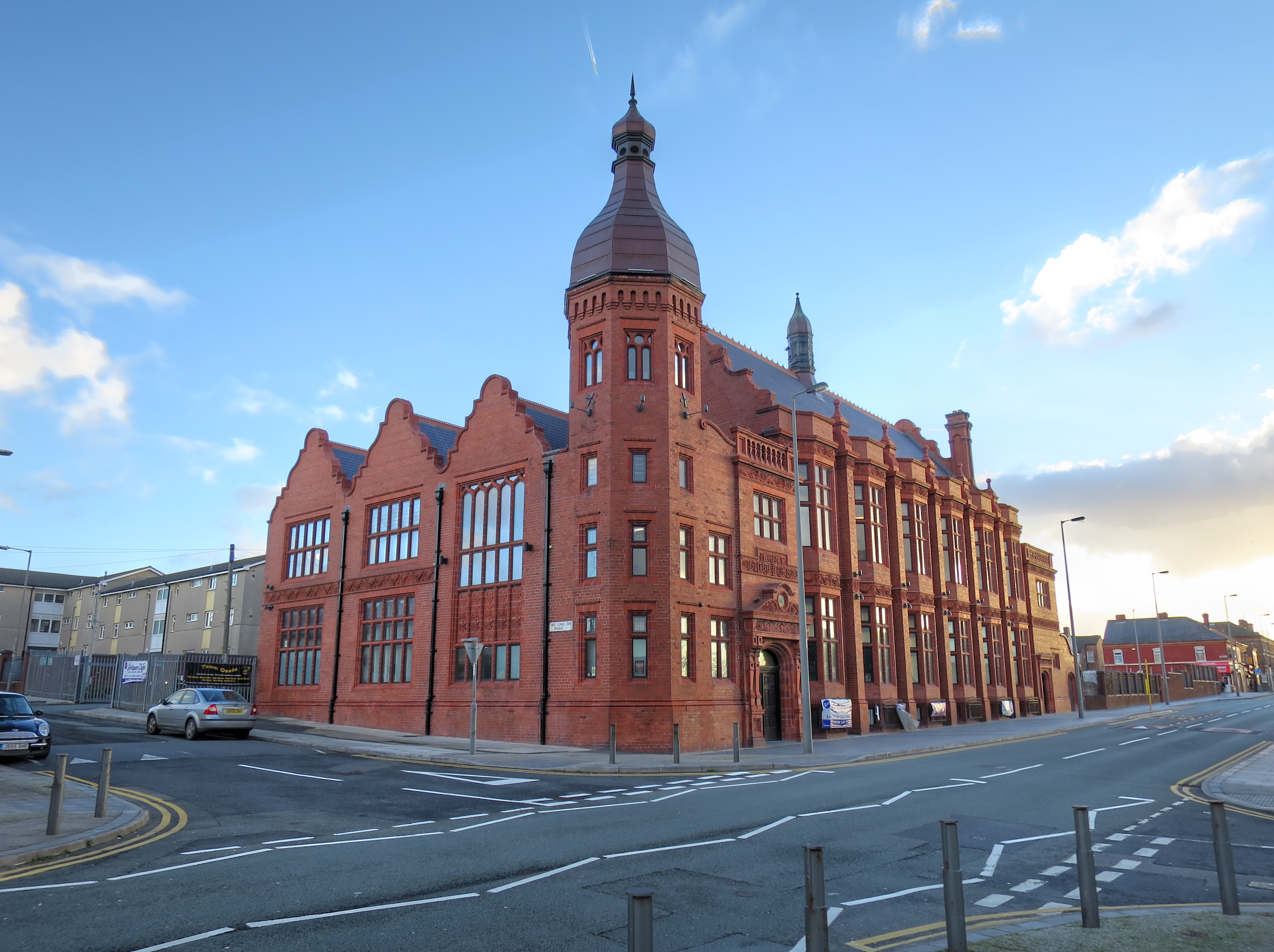
- The Florence Institute in its restored state in December 2014

- Location within Merseyside

General information
- Architectural style: Jacobean
- Location: Liverpool, England
- Coordinates: 53.383615°N 2.968752°W
- Construction started: 1889
- Completed: 1890
- Client: Sir Bernard Hall

Design and construction
- Architect: H W Keef

The Florence Institute for Boys, known colloquially as The Florrie, is a local landmark and a Grade II listed building on Mill Street in the Dingle, Liverpool, England (grid reference SJ356878).

== History ==
Probably designed by H W Keef, it was built in 1889 by Sir Bernard Hall, a West Indies merchant, Alderman and former Mayor of Liverpool. His daughter Florence died while in Paris at the age of 22 and he built this boys' club as a memorial and tribute to her at his sole expense.

The building itself was a fine example of late Victorian architecture with delicate use of terracotta, and originally it had splendid interiors, from the great hall to the top lit gym to the library.

The Florence Institute was officially opened as a boys club in 1890, four years after the opening of a similar establishment, the Gordon Working Lads Institute in Kirkdale on the other side of the city. However it was the first building in Britain to be specifically constructed as a boys' youth club.

As a magistrate Bernard Hall knew all too well the product of poverty and lack of recreation for youth in the area, and as stated by the plaque on the building, he created what he hoped would be 'an acceptable place of recreation and instruction for the poor and working boys of this district of the City'.

For a hundred years the 'Florrie' served the working and unemployed youth of the tough dock-side area. Weekend camps were held at Heswall on the Wirral Peninsula, reached by 6d ferry and bus return ticket. Summer camps were held in the Lake District away from the smoke, grime and pestilence of the inner city. A variety of sports and outdoor pursuits were provided for the community, including football, boxing and baseball to name a few. Gymnastics also was a part of the activities available for the local community. On the weekends dances were provided.

Towards the end of the 1980s, at the depths of the economic slump for Liverpool the funding dried up for the Institute and in 1987 it was sold and its management, The Florence Institute Incorporated Company, was dissolved in 1988 with the intention that the charitable work should be continued by another body. Unfortunately this never happened and through the Bona Vacantia principle title to the building eventually fell to the Duchy of Lancaster, which is the private property portfolio of the British monarch.

The building fell into disrepair and suffered from vandalism and the natural elements. This was compounded when in 1999 there was a major fire which destroyed the roof.

== Campaigning and regeneration ==
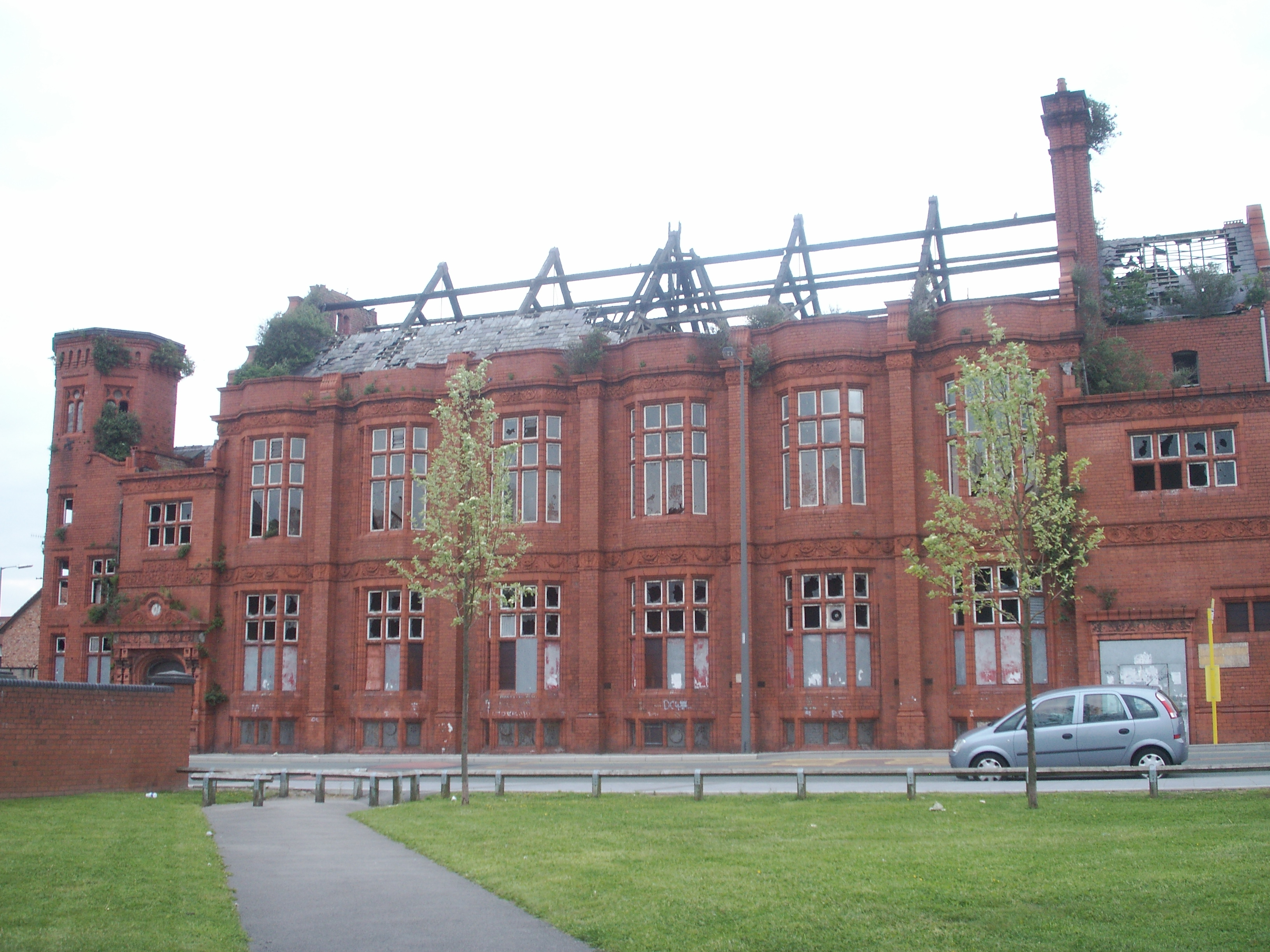
The Florence Institute in its derelict state in May 2008, prior to the restoration

As time went on the local community formed a pressure group, 'The Friends of the Florrie' to work with all the agencies and stakeholders to restore the splendour of the Florrie and provide a multi-ethnic community centre for all ages and abilities.

In 2004 the plight of the Florrie was featured as a part of the 'Stop the Rot' campaign run by the largest circulation newspaper in Liverpool, the Liverpool Echo, this raised the profile of the derelict state of the building widely.

The Florence Institute Trust Ltd is a community-led trust set up at the end of 2004 and chaired by the Bishop of Liverpool, Rev. James Jones. The trust applied for and received charitable status and also completed a community consultation on the future of the Florrie and successfully applied for a preliminary grant to create a regeneration plan and produce bids for more substantial funding for the repair and restoration of the building.

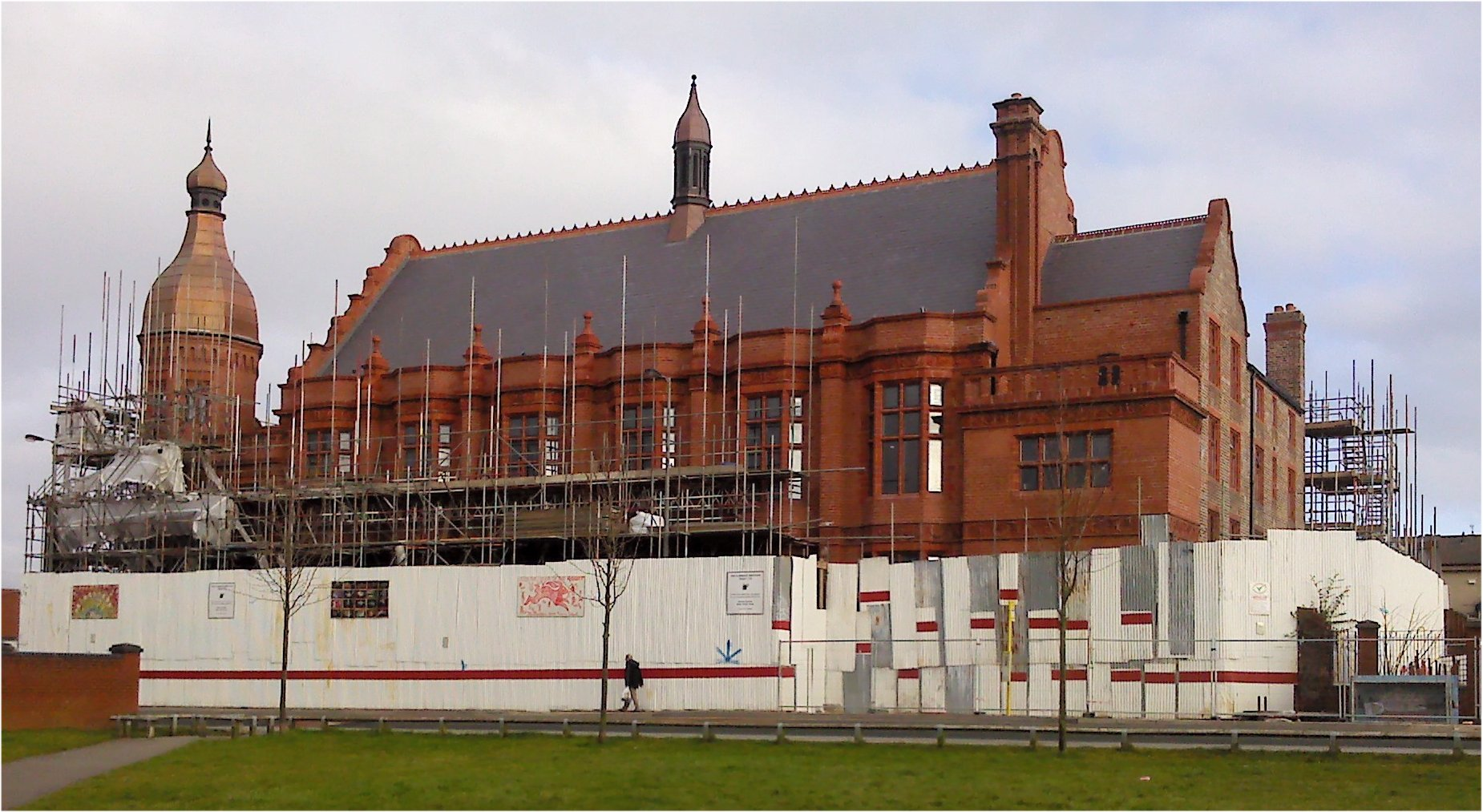
The restored Florrie emerges

In September 2006 campaigners applied for the Grade II listed status of the building to be upgraded to Grade II* which would signify that the building is of exceptional historical interest. Also that month the Heritage Lottery Fund agreed to a £3.9 million grant to help regenerate the institute. The plan is for the building to house a 300-seater auditorium, gym, café, crèche, social enterprises, library and heritage resource centre, and for the observatory to be restored.

On a visit to Liverpool at the end of April 2007, Prince Charles who has been a noted proponent of urban regeneration was amazed to discover that the institute belonged to his mother, the Queen when he enquired as to its ownership. The Prince's Regeneration Trust is now going to be in contact with the Florrie campaigners and the Prince promised to help however he could.

In January 2010 the Liverpool Echo reported that the Heritage Lottery Fund had confirmed funding of 3.7 million pounds towards the projected restoration costs of 6.6 million pounds.

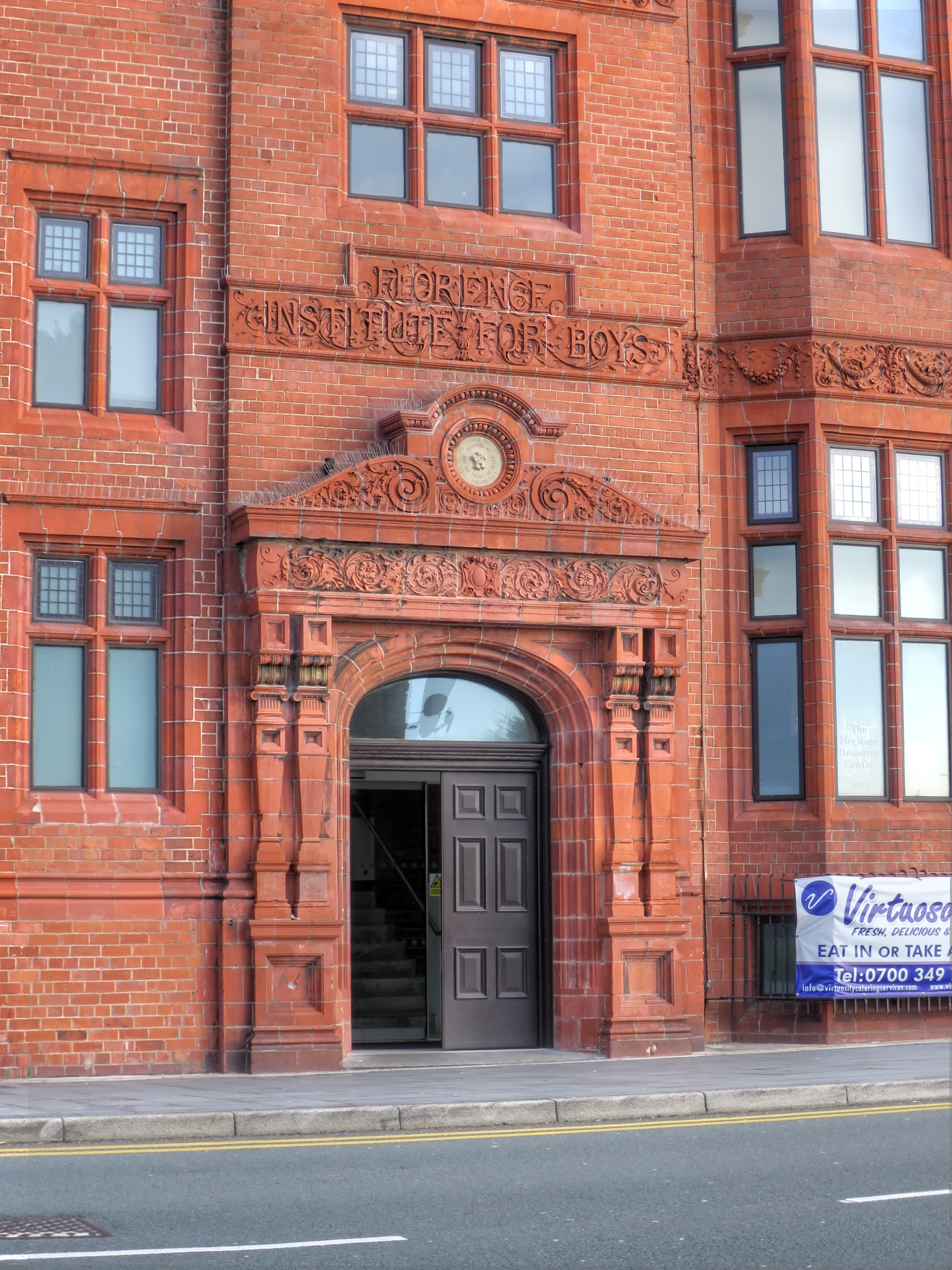
The doorway of the restored Florence Institute in December 2014

An application was also made to the Northwest Regional Development Agency for £1.7m from the European Regional Development Fund.

== Reopening ==
The Prince of Wales officially re-opened the institute building when he visited Liverpool on Monday, 21 January 2013

== Awards ==
The newly renovated Florence Institute has been shortlisted for two prestigious awards in 2013.

The Royal Institute of British Architects (RIBA) Award, and also the 2013 Royal Institution of Chartered Surveyors (RICS) Building Conservation Award. The Royal Institute of British Architects (RIBA) regional awards will be presented on 12 June 2013. The Royal Institution of Chartered Surveyors (RICS) awards for the North West will be announced on 9 May 2013.
