= Lord Chief Justice (disambiguation) =

Lord chief justice may refer to:

- Lord Chief Justice of England and Wales
- Lord Chief Justice of Ireland
- Lord Chief Justice of Northern Ireland
- Lord Chief Justice of the Common Pleas
- Lord Chief Justice of the King's Bench for Ireland

== See also ==
- Chief justice
- Lord President of the Court of Session
