= Lord Lieutenants of Cumberland =

Civil post in Cumberland, England

This is a list of people who have served as Lord Lieutenant of Cumberland. From 1765 to 1974, all Lord Lieutenants were also Custos Rotulorum of Cumberland.

- Henry Hastings, 3rd Earl of Huntingdon 20 August 1586 – 14 December 1595
- Likely no positions served
- George Clifford, 3rd Earl of Cumberland 1603–1605
- Likely no positions served
- Francis Clifford, 4th Earl of Cumberland 27 October 1607 – 31 August 1639 jointly with
- George Home, 1st Earl of Dunbar 27 October 1607 – 20 January 1611 and
- Theophilus Howard, 2nd Earl of Suffolk 27 October 1607 – 31 August 1639 and
- Henry Clifford, 1st Baron Clifford 27 October 1607 – 31 August 1639 and
- Algernon Percy, 10th Earl of Northumberland 13 November 1626 – 31 August 1639 and
- Thomas Howard, 21st Earl of Arundel 23 July 1632 – 1642 and
- Henry Howard, Lord Maltravers 23 July 1632 – 1642
- No positions served
- Charles Howard, 1st Earl of Carlisle 1 October 1660 – 24 February 1685
- Thomas Tufton, 6th Earl of Thanet 3 March 1685 – 1687
- Richard Graham, 1st Viscount Preston 29 August 1687 – 1688
- Sir John Lowther, 2nd Baronet 8 April 1689 – 1694
- Charles Howard, 3rd Earl of Carlisle 28 June 1694 – 1 May 1738
- Henry Lowther, 3rd Viscount Lonsdale 1 June 1738 – 7 March 1751
- Charles Wyndham, 2nd Earl of Egremont 23 April 1751 – 1759
- James Lowther, 1st Earl of Lonsdale 13 December 1759 – 24 May 1802
- William Lowther, 1st Earl of Lonsdale 26 June 1802 – 19 March 1844
- William Lowther, 2nd Earl of Lonsdale 3 May 1844 – 1868
- Henry Lowther, 3rd Earl of Lonsdale 14 December 1868 – 15 August 1876
- Josslyn Francis Pennington, 5th Baron Muncaster 3 October 1876 – 30 March 1917
- Hugh Lowther, 5th Earl of Lonsdale 22 May 1917 – 13 April 1944
- Frescheville Hubert Ballantine-Dykes 5 April 1944 – 1949
- Sir Robert Christopher Chance 19 April 1949 – 1958
- Sir Frederick Fergus Graham, 5th Baronet 12 December 1958 – 1968
- John Charles Wade 27 May 1968 – 31 March 1974

The county became part of Cumbria on 31 March 1974. See Lord Lieutenant of Cumbria.
