= Sir Joseph Pennington, 2nd Baronet =

British landowner and Whig politician

Sir Joseph Pennington, 2nd Baronet (4 October 1677 – 1744), of Muncaster, Cumberland, was a British landowner and Whig politician who sat in the House of Commons from 1734 to 1744.

Pennington was baptized at Waberthwaite on 16 October 1677, the eldest son of Sir William Pennington, 1st Baronet of Muncaster and his wife Isabella Stapleton, daughter of John Stapleton of Warter, Yorkshire. He matriculated at Queen’s College, Oxford on 4 June 1695, aged 17. He married Margaret Lowther, daughter of John Lowther, 1st Viscount Lonsdale, MP on 20 March 1706.

In 1720 Pennington was recommended to Walpole by his brother-in-law, Lord Lonsdale, and in 1723 he obtained a place as Comptroller of cash in the excise. He succeeded to the baronetcy and Muncaster on the death of his father on 12 July 1730. In order to be able to stand for Parliament in 1734, he surrendered his post to his son. At the 1734 British general election, he was returned unopposed as Member of Parliament for Cumberland on the recommendation of his brother-in-law, in succession to Gilfrid Lawson, who gave him his interest. He was returned unopposed again at the 1741 British general election and voted with the Government in all recorded divisions.

Pennington died on 3 December 1744 leaving four sons and a daughter. He was succeeded in the baronetcy by his son John.

Parliament of Great Britain
Preceded by James Lowther; Gilfrid Lawson	Member of Parliament for Cumberland; 1734 –1744; With: James Lowther	Succeeded by James Lowther; Sir John Pennington, Bt
Baronetage of England
Preceded by William Pennington	Baronet (of Muncaster); 1730-1744	Succeeded by John Pennington
