= Lord Lieutenant of Westmorland =

Civil post in Westmorland, England

This is a list of people who have served as Lord-Lieutenant of Westmorland. The office was abolished on 31 March 1974 and replaced by the Lord Lieutenant of Cumbria. From 1751 to 1974, all Lord Lieutenants were also Custos Rotulorum of Westmorland.

- Henry Clifford, 2nd Earl of Cumberland 1553–1559
- Henry Hastings, 3rd Earl of Huntingdon 20 August 1586 – 14 December 1595
- vacant?
- George Clifford, 3rd Earl of Cumberland 1603–1605
- vacant?
- Francis Clifford, 4th Earl of Cumberland 27 October 1607 – 4 January 1641 jointly with
- George Home, 1st Earl of Dunbar 27 October 1607 – 20 January 1611 and
- Theophilus Howard, 2nd Earl of Suffolk 27 October 1607 – 31 August 1639 and
- Henry Clifford, 1st Baron Clifford 27 October 1607 – 1642 and
- Algernon Percy, 10th Earl of Northumberland 13 November 1626 – 31 August 1639 and
- Thomas Howard, 21st Earl of Arundel 23 July 1632 – 31 August 1639 and
- Henry Howard, Lord Maltravers 23 July 1632 – 31 August 1639
- Interregnum
- Charles Howard, 1st Earl of Carlisle 1 October 1660 – 24 February 1685
- Thomas Tufton, 6th Earl of Thanet 3 March 1685 – 1687
- Richard Graham, 1st Viscount Preston 29 August 1687 – 1688
- Sir John Lowther, 2nd Baronet 8 April 1689 – 1694
- Charles Howard, 3rd Earl of Carlisle 28 June 1694 – 1 May 1738
- Henry Lowther, 3rd Viscount Lonsdale 1 June 1738 – 7 March 1751
- vacant
- Sir William Lowther, 3rd Baronet 6 February 1753 – 15 April 1756
- Sir John Pennington, 3rd Baronet 29 April 1756 – 1758
- James Lowther, 1st Earl of Lonsdale 13 December 1759 – 24 May 1802
- William Lowther, 1st Earl of Lonsdale 26 June 1802 – 19 March 1844
- William Lowther, 2nd Earl of Lonsdale 3 May 1844 – 1868
- Henry Lowther, 3rd Earl of Lonsdale 14 December 1868 – 15 August 1876
- Sir Richard Musgrave, 11th Baronet 3 October 1876 – 13 February 1881
- Henry Tufton, 1st Baron Hothfield 15 March 1881 – 29 October 1926
- Lord Henry Cavendish-Bentinck 8 December 1926 – 6 October 1931
- Stanley Hughes le Fleming 7 December 1931 – 1939
- Anthony Lowther, Viscount Lowther 1 December 1939 – 1945
- James Winstanley Cropper 26 April 1945 – 10 November 1956
- Henry Hornyold-Strickland 6 May 1957 – 1965
- Lieutenant-Commander Paul Norman Wilson 12 November 1965 – 31 March 1974
