= Bristow (surname) =

Bristow is a surname, derived from the earlier name of the city of Bristol. Notable people with the surname include:

- Abraham Bristow (c. 1771 – 1846), British mariner
- Alan Bristow (1923–2009), British helicopter entrepreneur, founder of Bristow Helicopters
- Allan Bristow (born 1951), American basketball coach
- Amelia Bristow (1783–1860), British writer
- Benjamin Bristow (1832–1896), American lawyer and politician
- Chris Bristow (1937–1960), British racing driver
- Edmund Bristow (1787–1876), English artist
- Emma Bristow (born 1990), British motorcycle racer
- Eric Bristow (1957–2018), English darts player
- George Bristow (disambiguation), any of several people by that name
- Grant Bristow (born 1958), Canadian security agent
- Guy Bristow (born 1955), English footballer
- Gwen Bristow (1903–1980), American author and journalist
- Henry William Bristow (1817–1889), English geologist
- John Bristow (1701–1768), English merchant and politician
- Joseph Bristow (professor), British academic
- Joseph L. Bristow (1861–1944), American politician
- Laurence Bristow (born 1952), British racing driver
- Laurie Bristow (born 1963), British diplomat
- Mark Bristow (born 1962), English paralympic cyclist
- Mark Bristow (businessman) (born 1959), South African businessman
- Naomi Bristow (born 1997), Canadian country music artist
- Patrick Bristow (born 1962), American actor
- Paul Bristow, British politician
- Richard Bristow (1538–1581), English Catholic writer
- Robert Bristow (1662–1706), MP for Winchelsea 1698–1701
- Robert Bristow (1687–1737), MP for Winchelsea 1708–37
- Robert Bristow (1712–1776), MP for Winchelsea 1738–41, New Shoreham 1747–61
- Robert Bristow (engineer) (1880–1966), British harbour engineer best known for development of the port of Kochi in India

== Fictional characters ==
- Jack Bristow, on the television series Alias
- Irina Derevko, a character on the television series Alias also known as "Laura Bristow"
- Sydney Bristow, on the television series Alias

== See also ==
- Ethel Bristowe
- Richard Bristowe (disambiguation)
- W.S. Bristowe (1901–1979), English naturalist
