= Sir Henry Fludyer, 4th Baronet =

British Anglican priest

Arms of Fludyer: Sable, a cross patoncée between four escallops argent each charged with a cross patoncée of the field

Sir John Henry Fludyer, 4th Baronet (1803–1896), generally known as Henry Fludyer, was an English baronet and clergyman who restored St Nicholas' Church in Thistleton, Rutland, as a memorial to his three eldest children. He inherited the baronetcy at a late age after his cousin and two elder brothers died without issue. He inherited the family seat at Ayston, a village where he was already rector, and near which he seems to have spent most of his life. He died at age 92, having been connected to the parish of Ayston for nearly 70 years.

== Early life ==
John Henry Fludyer was born the youngest of seven children of George Fludyer MP and Lady Mary Fane, daughter of John Fane, 9th Earl of Westmorland. His two elder brothers had military careers, and while he was at school at Westminster, he wished to follow them. His father, however, had decided that the Church should be his career, and so he went up to St John's College, Cambridge, where he took his BA in 1826. He was appointed curate to the parish of Ayston in 1826.

== Marriage and family ==
In 1832, Fludyer married Augusta, daughter of Sir Richard Borough, Bart, and granddaughter of Viscount Lake. In 1834 he was appointed Rector of Thistleton and of Ayston. (The living was in the gift of his father George.) In 1842, his eldest three children of their seven children died of scarlet fever at the ages of 4, 6 and 8 years while the family were living in Thistleton. In 1863, on the death of his second brother William the remaining family moved to Ayston Hall, whose grounds adjoin the church there, and in 1870 he resigned the living at Thistleton. In 1879-80 he and Augusta restored Thistleton church in the memory of their three eldest children. Their children were:

- Augusta Mary died 1842 in childhood
- Caroline 1835–1842, died in childhood
- Henry 1838–1842, died in childhood
- Charles 1840–1895, married Lucy Hodder in 1866. Rose to Lt Col in the Grenadier Guards and retired in 1876. He died in Camborne, Cornwall where he had mining interests, and was said to have lost a large fortune. He had no children.
- Katharine born 1841, married Henry Randolph Finch and had a son, Vere Finch
- Arthur John 1844–1922, 5th and last Baronet, married Augusta Borough, daughter of Sir Edward Richard Borough, his cousin.
- Henry 1847-1919 CVO and Gentleman Usher in Ordinary to Edward VII married Mary Hordern in 1891. He joined the Scots Guards and rose to Command of the Regiment in 1898. He retired in 1903, but from 1914 to 1916 he was in temporary command of the Scots Guards. He died without issue.

Augusta died in 1889. Henry was reputed to be a devoted husband, and it was said that never once did she leave the room without his standing to open the door for her, and that every year he cut the first rose of the season for her, and placed it on her boudoir table. At his death, at the age of 93, his personal probate was £9,810. He was buried beside her in St Mary the Virgin's Church, Ayston.

Baronetage of Great Britain
Preceded by Samuel Fludyer	Baronet (of Ayston Hall); 1876-1896	Succeeded by Arthur John Fludyer
