= Fludyer =

Fludyer is a surname. Notable people with the surname include:

- George Fludyer, MP for Chippenham and Appleby
- Fludyer baronets
- Samuel Fludyer (disambiguation), multiple people
