= Overdo =

Overdo is a surname. Notable people with the surname include:

- Adam Overdo of Bartholomew Fayre: A Comedy
- Robert Overdo (fl. 1368–1386), MP for Appleby-in-Westmorland
- Robert Overdo (fl. 1402), MP for Appleby-in-Westmorland
- John Overdo, MP for Appleby-in-Westmorland
