= Samuel Fludyer =

Samuel Fludyer may refer to:

- Sir Samuel Fludyer, 1st Baronet (died 1768), MP for Chippenham, 1754–1768
- Sir Samuel Brudenell Fludyer, 2nd Baronet (1759–1833), MP for Aldborough, 1781–1784
- Sir Samuel Fludyer, 3rd Baronet (1800–1876)
