= Robert Overdo =

Robert Overdo may refer to:

- Robert Overdo (fl. 1368–1386), MP for Appleby
- Robert Overdo (fl. 1402), MP for Appleby, probably son/nephew of above
