= 1905 Appleby by-election =

UK parliamentary by-election

← 1900	2 March 1905	1906 →
Candidate	Jones	Noble
Party	Liberal	Conservative
Popular vote	2,922	2,702
Percentage	52.0%	48.0%
MP before election
Richard Rigg
Liberal
Subsequent MP
Leif Jones
Liberal

The 1905 Appleby by-election was a Parliamentary by-election held on 2 March 1905. The constituency returned one Member of Parliament (MP) to the House of Commons of the United Kingdom, elected by the first past the post voting system.

== Vacancy and electoral history ==
Richard Rigg had been Liberal MP for the seat of Appleby since the 1900 general election. Rigg aged only 23, had a large majority of 11.4%. This was a surprise, since Appleby had previously returned only Conservatives since 1885. Rigg resigned from the Liberal Party on 25 November 1904 because he found himself in agreement with the Conservative government on so many key issues. The result at the last election was as follows:

Rigg

General election 1900: Appleby
Party	Candidate	Votes	%	±%
Liberal	Richard Rigg	2,835	55.7	+14.4
Conservative	Joseph Savory	2,256	44.3	−14.4
Majority		579	11.4	N/A
Turnout		5,091	75.5	−4.1
Liberal gain from Conservative		Swing	+14.4	

== Candidates ==
When Rigg announced his resignation from the Liberal Party he also announced his intention to resign his seat and seek re-election as a Conservative. However, the local Conservative Association had already selected 46-year-old Major George Noble as their candidate to re-gain the seat at the next general election. Noble was the heir to his father's baronetcy. He had been educated at Harrow School and Sandhurst Military Academy. He was in the 13th Hussars, fought at Lucknow and served in the South African War being invalided home in 1901. Noble was not willing to stand down and allow Rigg a straight fight against a new Liberal candidate. Rigg thus found himself in a difficult situation. The Conservatives had already chosen a candidate and the Liberals were selecting his replacement. Faced with this dilemma, he decided not to resign his seat but to go abroad. He claimed that the “ruffianism” of Liberals angry at his defection of the party had made him ill, and he went to an unnamed continental health resort to recover.

Leif Jones

On 14 December 1904, the local Liberal Association selected 42-year-old Leif Jones as their new candidate to hold the seat. Born Leifchild Stratten Jones on 16 January 1862 in St Pancras, London, the fifth of the six children of the Reverend Thomas Jones (1819–1882), an Independent clergyman, formerly of Morriston, Swansea, and Jane Jones, daughter of John Jones of Dowlais. His older siblings were David Brynmor (b. 1851), Annie, John Viriamu (b. 1862) and Irvonwy; his younger brother was Morlais Glasfryn. His brothers David Brynmor Jones and John Viriamu Jones would both achieve prominence in public life. In 1867, when Leifchild was five years old, his mother died, and in 1869 his father left London, for health reasons, moving firstly back to Swansea (1870–1877) and afterwards to Melbourne, Australia (1877–1880), where Leifchild was educated at Scotch School. Afterwards Leifchild became a student at Trinity College, Oxford. He was Private Secretary to the Countess of Carlisle, a prominent prohibitionist campaigner. As a temperance campaigner Leif Jones was sometimes referred to as 'Tea-leaf Jones'. He was an experienced candidate having previously fought Westminster in 1892, Leeds Central in 1895 and Manchester South in 1900. He started to work the constituency even though Rigg had yet to resign from parliament.

Rigg returned to England in February 1905, and resigned his seat on 11 February 1905 by becoming Steward of the Manor of Northstead. He told the Annual Dinner of the Carlisle Conservative Club "I am proud to be one of you now ... I have the satisfaction of feeling that what I have done was conscientious and right." He had also decided not to contest the subsequent by-election.

== Campaign ==
Polling Day was fixed for 2 March 1905, just 19 days after Rigg's resignation. The weather during the campaign saw rain and snow. Jones launched his campaign by condemning the Chinese Labour Act, the Education Act 1902 and Joseph Chamberlain's fiscal proposals. The main national issue at the time was the decision of the Unionist Government to abandon free trade to advocate the introduction of tariff reform. Noble launched his campaign by not fully endorsing Chamberlain's tariff reform programme, stating he was opposed to any fiscal scheme that would raise the price of food.

== Result ==
The Liberals held the seat from the Conservatives:

Jones

Appleby by-election, 1905
Party	Candidate	Votes	%	±%
Liberal	Leif Jones	2,922	52.0	−3.7
Conservative	Sir George Noble, 2nd Baronet	2,702	48.0	+3.7
Majority		220	4.0	−7.4
Turnout		5,624	84.3	+8.8
Liberal hold		Swing	-3.7	

Even though women did not have the vote, disappointed Tories blamed them for their defeat. “There can be no shadow of doubt,” declared Josceline Bagot, Conservative MP for neighbouring Kendal, “that Major Noble’s defeat was caused by the efforts of wives who feared the introduction of protection.” A month after the by-election, Noble wrote to Appleby Conservatives that “his health had failed” and his doctors had sent him on vacation to Gibraltar and Tangier.

== Aftermath ==
In October 1905 Noble had made the long-expected announcement that he would not stand, blaming “my own shortcomings as a candidate”. The Conservatives chose a new candidate but Jones clung on to the set by just 3 votes:

General election 1906: Appleby
Party	Candidate	Votes	%	±%
Liberal	Leif Jones	2,894	50.0	−2.0
Conservative	Henry Petty-Fitzmaurice	2,891	50.0	+2.0
Majority		3	0.0	−4.0
Turnout		5,785	88.4	+4.1
Liberal hold		Swing		
