= Henry Finch =

Henry Finch may also refer to:

- Henry Finch (died 1625), English lawyer and politician, MP for Canterbury, and for St Albans
- Henry Finch (died 1761) (1694–1761), British academic and politician, MP for Malton
- Henry Finch (priest) (1633–1704), English ejected minister
- Henry Finch (cricketer) (1842–1935), English cricketer and barrister
- Henry LeRoy Finch, American film director
- Henry Leroy Finch Jr. (born 1918), American scholar, professor of philosophy and pacifist organizer
- Henry Lloyd Finch, member of the Mississippi legislature

== See also ==
- Henry Finch-Hatton, 13th Earl of Winchilsea (1852–1927), English peer
- Harry Finch (1907–1949), Australian rugby league player
