= John Sowerby =

John Sowerby may refer to:

- John Sowerby (MP) (fl.1391-1411), English lawyer and MP
- John Edward Sowerby (1825–1870), English botanist, publisher, and illustrator
- John George Sowerby (1849–1914), English painter, glass maker, and children's book illustrator
