= Robert Wheatley =

Robert Wheatley may refer to:

- Robert Wheatley (soccer), Australian soccer player
- Robert Wheatley (MP) (died 1558), English MP
- Robert Wheatley (governor), governor of Barbados
