= Richard Rigg =

Richard Rigg may refer to:

- Richard Rigg (Canadian politician) (1872–1964), Methodist minister and politician in Manitoba
- Richard Rigg (British politician) (1877–1942), British Liberal politician who defected to the Conservatives
