= Adam Crosby =

Adam Crosby may refer to:

- Adam Brown Crosby, Canadian politician
- Adam Crosby (MP), English MP for Appleby
- Adam Crosby (actor), in Pineapple Express (film)
