= Borough baronets =

List of Borough baronets

The Borough Baronetcy, of Coolock Park (sometimes Coolock Lodge, Raheny) in the County of Dublin, was a title in the Baronetage of the United Kingdom. It was created on 13 November 1813 for Richard Borough. The title became extinct on the death of the second Baronet in 1879.

== Borough baronets, of Coolock Park (1813) ==
Escutcheon of the Borough baronets of Coolock Park

- Sir Richard Borough, 1st Baronet (1756–1837) son of Richard Borough and Dorothy Jones and husband of Anna Maria Lake (daughter of Gerard Lake, 1st Viscount Lake). Issue included Amabel Elizabeth Borough, Countess of Pomfret who married Thomas Fermor, 4th Earl of Pomfret and Augusta Borough who married Sir John Henry Fludyer, 4th Baronet
- Sir Edward Richard Borough, 2nd Baronet (1800–1879) married Elizabeth St.Lawrence daughter of William St Lawrence, 2nd Earl of Howth. They resided at Glenaveena house on the south eastern slopes of Howth Head. He was Sheriff of Dublin City in 1841. Issue included Augusta Frances Borough who married Sir Arthur John Fludyer, 5th Baronet (Born 12 October 1844)

== See also ==
- Sheriff of Dublin City

Baronetage of the United Kingdom
Preceded by Duff-Gordon baronets	Borough baronets of Coolock Park; 13 November 1813	Succeeded by Jervoise baronets
