= Robert Bristow =

Robert Bristow may refer to:

- Robert Bristow (1662–1706), MP for Winchelsea 1698–1701
- Robert Bristow (1688–1737), MP for Winchelsea 1708–37
- Robert Bristow (1712–1776), MP for Winchelsea 1738–41, New Shoreham 1747–61
- Robert Bristow (engineer) (1880–1966), British harbour engineer best known for development of the port of Kochi in India
- Robert Francis "Bob" Bristowe, co-founder of the Australian oil company Santos Limited
- Robert O'Neil Bristow (1926–2018), American novelist

== See also ==
- Bristow (surname)
