= Overdone =

Overdone may refer to:

- Mistress Overdone, a character in the Shakespeare play Measure for Measure

== Songs ==
- "Overdone", from the 1980 Madness album Absolutely
- "Overdone", from the 2010 Ludo album Prepare the Preparations
- "Overdone", from the 2014 Bombay Bicycle Clumb album So Long, See You Tomorrow

== See also ==
- Doneness, a gauge of how thoroughly cooked is a cut of meat
- Overdo, a surname
- Overkill (disambiguation)
