= Fludyer baronets =

Arms of Fludyer: Sable, a cross patoncée between four escallops argent each charged with a cross patoncée of the field

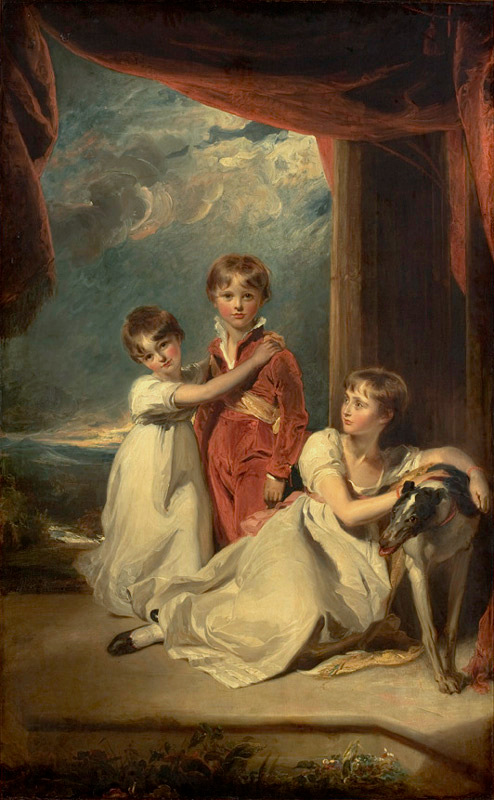
Thomas Lawrence: Children of Sir Samuel Fludyer (1806), today Museu de Arte de São Paulo

The Fludyer Baronetcy, of The City of London, was a title in the Baronetage of Great Britain. It was created on 14 November 1759 for the merchant, banker and politician Sir Samuel Fludyer, with remainder in default of male issue of his own to his brother Thomas Fludyer and his issue male. The second Baronet was Member of Parliament for Aldborough. The title became extinct on the death of the fifth Baronet in 1922.

George Fludyer, second son of the first Baronet, was Member of Parliament for Chippenham and Appleby. The family seat was initially at Lee in Kent but moved to Ayston Hall, near Uppingham, Rutland.

== Fludyer baronets, of London (1759) ==
- Sir Samuel Fludyer, 1st Baronet (c. 1704–1768)
- Sir Samuel Brudenell Fludyer, 2nd Baronet (1759–1833)
- Sir Samuel Fludyer, 3rd Baronet (1800–1876)
- Sir John Henry Fludyer, 4th Baronet (1803–1896)
- Sir Arthur John Fludyer, 5th Baronet (1844–1922)

Baronetage of Great Britain
Preceded by Colebrooke baronets	Fludyer baronets of London; 14 November 1759	Succeeded by Watson baronets
