= John Ninezergh =

John Ninezergh (died 1420), of Ninezergh, Westmorland, was an English Member of Parliament (MP).

He was a Member of the Parliament of England for Appleby in 1406.
