= William Soulby =

William Soulby (died 1393/4), of Knock in Long Marton, Westmorland, was an English Member of Parliament (MP).

He was married with at least one son.

He was a Member of the Parliament of England for Appleby in May 1382, 1385, February 1388 and 1391.

Soulby was murdered by Sir Thomas Rokeby, MP for Yorkshire.
