= Ayston =

Village and civil parish in Rutland, England

Coordinates: 52.60°N 0.73°W

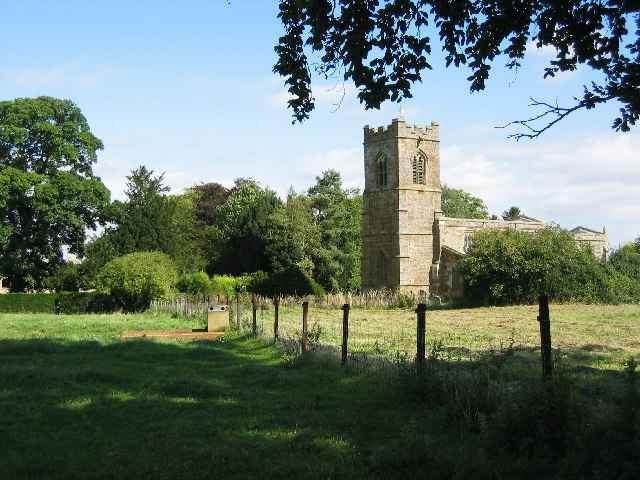
- St Mary the Virgin's Church, Ayston

- Location within Rutland
- Area: 1.41 sq mi (3.7 km^{2})
- Population: 46 2001 Census
  - Density: 33/sq mi (13/km^{2})
- OS grid reference: SK860010
  - London: 80 miles (130 km) SSE
- Unitary authority: Rutland
- Shire county: Rutland
- Ceremonial county: Rutland
- Region: East Midlands
- Country: England
- Sovereign state: United Kingdom
- Post town: OAKHAM
- Postcode district: LE15
- Dialling code: 01572
- Police: Leicestershire
- Fire: Leicestershire
- Ambulance: East Midlands
- UK Parliament: Rutland and Stamford

Ayston is a village and civil parish in the county of Rutland in the East Midlands of England. It is about one mile (1.6 km) north-west of Uppingham, close to the junction of the A47 and A6003. The population of the village was less than 100 at the 2011 census and is included in the civil parish of Ridlington. The placename means Aethelstan's farm or settlement; the estate was granted to Aethelstan, a minister of Edward the Confessor, in 1046.

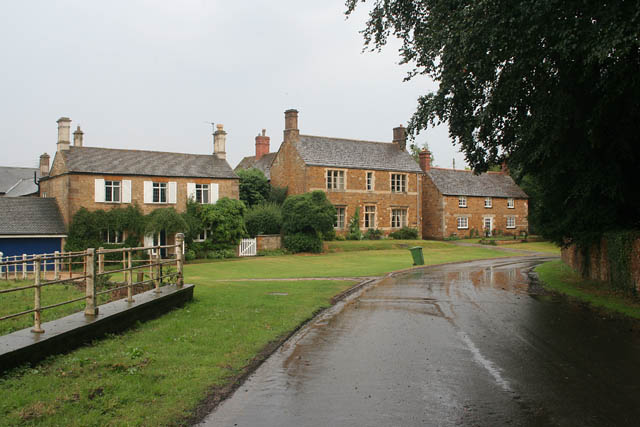
Houses in Ayston

Ayston is part of Braunston & Belton ward which has one councillor on Rutland County Council.

The Grade II* listed St Mary the Virgin's Church came into the care of Churches Conservation Trust in April 2014.

== Ayston Hall ==
Ayston Hall is a 19th-century, Grade II listed, two-storey house constructed of ashlar with a stone-tiled roof and a three-bay frontage. It stands in 2.4 acres (0.97 ha) of garden.

The house was built in 1807 by William Daniel Legg for George Fludyer. He had inherited the land from his widowed mother, the wife of Sir Samuel Fludyer, 1st Baronet. It became the seat of the Fludyer family and descended to the 5th and last baronet, Arthur John. On his death without an heir in 1922 the property passed to his nephew James Finch. In 2013 the house was on sale for £2.75 million.

== See also ==
- St Mary the Virgin's Church, Ayston
