= Thomas Manningham (MP) =

English politician

Thomas Manningham (died c. 1455), of Ardsley and Wrenthorpe, Yorkshire and Wrestlingworth, Bedfordshire, was an English politician.

He was a member (MP) of the parliament of England for Appleby in March 1416, Carlisle in 1419 and Bedford in December 1421. He was also justice of the peace in Bedfordshire, and also escheator of both that county and Buckinghamshire.
