= Robert Overdo (fl. 1402) =

English politician

Robert Overdo (fl. 1402) of Appleby-in-Westmorland, was an English politician.

== Family ==
Overdo was probably the son or nephew of another Appleby MP, Robert Overdo.

== Career ==
He was a Member (MP) of the Parliament of England for Appleby in 1402.

Parliament of England
Preceded by ? ?	Member of Parliament for Appleby; 1402; With: Robert Gare	Succeeded by ? ?
