= Leif Jones =

British politician (1862–1939)

Leifchild Stratten Leif-Jones PC
- Jones in 1905

Member of Parliament for Appleby
- In office 1905 – January 1910
- Preceded by: Richard Rigg
- Succeeded by: Lancelot Sanderson

Member of Parliament for Rushcliffe
- In office December 1910 – 1918
- Preceded by: John Ellis
- Succeeded by: Henry Betterton

Member of Parliament for Camborne
- In office 1923–1924
- Preceded by: Algernon Moreing
- Succeeded by: Algernon Moreing

Member of Parliament for Camborne
- In office 1929–1931
- Preceded by: Algernon Moreing
- Succeeded by: Sir Peter Agnew, Bt

Personal details
- Born: 16 January 1862 St Pancras, London, England
- Died: 26 September 1939 (aged 77) Marylebone, London, England
- Party: Liberal
- Parents: Thomas Jones (father); Jane Jones (mother)
- Relatives: David Brynmor Jones (brother); John Viriamu Jones (brother)
- Education: Scotch College, Melbourne
- Alma mater: Trinity College, Oxford

Jones c. 1905

Leifchild Stratten Leif-Jones, 1st Baron Rhayader, PC (né Leifchild Stratten Jones; 16 January 1862 – 26 September 1939), known as Leif Jones before his elevation to the peerage in 1932, was a British Temperance movement leader and Liberal politician.

== Background and education ==
He was born Leifchild Stratten Jones on 16 January 1862 in St Pancras, London, the fifth of the six children of Thomas Jones (1819–1882), an Independent clergyman, formerly of Morriston, Swansea, and Jane Jones, daughter of John Jones of Dowlais. His elder siblings were David Brynmor (b. 1851), Annie, John Viriamu (b. 1862), and Irvonwy; his younger brother was Morlais Glasfryn. His brothers David Brynmor Jones and John Viriamu Jones both went on to achieve prominence in public life.

In 1867, when Leifchild was five years old, his mother died, and, in 1869, his father left London, for health reasons, moving firstly back to Swansea (1870–1877) and afterwards to Melbourne, Australia (1877–1880), where Leifchild was educated at Scotch College, Melbourne, from 31 July 1877 to December 1878. Subsequently Leifchild became a student at Trinity College, Oxford.

== Member of Parliament and temperance campaigner ==
In May 1900 he contested the South Manchester constituency in a by-election, losing to the Liberal Unionist candidate. From 1905 to January 1910 Leif Jones served as Member of Parliament for Appleby, in Westmorland. Whilst an MP he voted in favour of the 1908 Women's Enfranchisement Bill.

From December 1910 to 1918 he served as Member for Rushcliffe, in Nottinghamshire. In 1917 he was sworn of the Privy Council. From 1923 to 1924 and from 1929 to 1931 he served as Member for Camborne, in Cornwall.

On 25 January 1932, Jones was elevated to the peerage as Baron Rhayader, of Rhayader in the County of Radnor. So that he might continue to be known by the familiar name of "Leif Jones" he had earlier that month changed his surname by deed poll from "Jones" to "Leif-Jones".

Despite his long political career, Leif Jones is best remembered as a temperance leader. He was President of the United Kingdom Alliance (UKA), the leading British prohibitionist organisation, between 1906 and 1932. He had earlier been private secretary to the Countess of Carlisle, a prominent prohibitionist campaigner. As a temperance campaigner Leif Jones was sometimes referred to as 'Tea-leaf Jones'.

Lord Rhayader died in Marylebone, London, in September 1939, aged 77, when the barony became extinct.

Photographic portraits of Lord Rhayader may be seen at the National Portrait Gallery, London.

Parliament of the United Kingdom
Preceded by Richard Rigg	Member of Parliament for Appleby; 1905 – January 1910	Succeeded by Lancelot Sanderson
Preceded by John Ellis	Member of Parliament for Rushcliffe; December 1910 – 1918	Succeeded by Henry Betterton
Preceded by Algernon Moreing	Member of Parliament for Camborne; 1923 – 1924	Succeeded by Algernon Moreing
Preceded by Algernon Moreing	Member of Parliament for Camborne; 1929 – 1931	Succeeded by Sir Peter Agnew, Bt
Peerage of the United Kingdom
New creation	Baron Rhayader; 1932–1939	Extinct
