= Richard Bristowe =

Richard Bristowe may refer to:

- Richard Bristow (1538–1581), English Catholic controversialist and Biblical scholar
- Richard Bristowe (MP) for Appleby
