= Sir Samuel Fludyer, 3rd Baronet =

Arms of Fludyer: Sable, a cross patoncée between four escallops argent each charged with a cross patoncée of the field

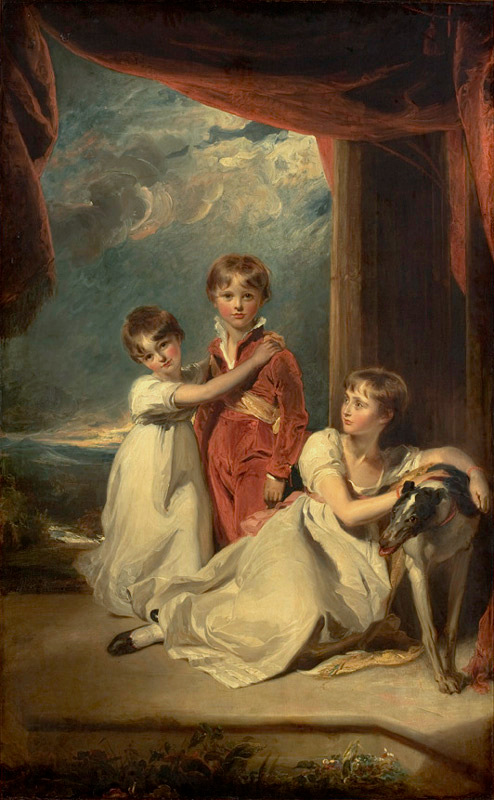
Thomas Lawrence: Children of Sir Samuel Fludyer (1806), Museu de Arte de São Paulo

Sir Samuel Fludyer, 3rd Baronet (1800–1876) was the grandson of the first Baronet, Sir Samuel Fludyer, who was reckoned at the time of his death to be the richest man in the country with a wealth of £900,000. He was the only son of Sir Samuel Brudenell Fludyer, who inherited most of the first Sir Samuel's fortune, and had his children painted by Thomas Lawrence, the foremost portrait painter of the time, indicating the family's wealth and social standing. The portrait shows Sir Samuel (3rd Baronet) between his sisters Maria and Carolina Louisa.

He was educated at Christ Church, Oxford and succeeded to the baronetcy in 1833. After an argument with his sisters Sir Samuel was admitted to Ticehurst Private Asylum in Sussex in 1839 and stayed there until his death.

== Financial motivations ==
He was placed in the asylum under certificates from Drs Munro and Sutherland and on the order of his brother-in-law Cobbett Derby. As a result of his having been confined he died a bachelor and had no issue, and his considerable estate was divided equally between his sisters Maria Fludyer and Caroline Louisa Derby. His father's will stipulated that if Samuel died without an heir his fortune would be transferred to George Fludyer, the second Sir Samuel's brother and his heirs male, along with the Baronetcy, but it reserved £80,000 for Samuel to leave at his discretion. Under the will of the third baronet, each of his sisters would inherit £10,000, but he left no residuary legatee. In the end, the sisters inherited the whole £80,000 shared between them.

In addition, the proprietors of the asylum gained from Sir Samuel's incarceration. At a charge of 12 guineas per week he was the highest paying patient at Ticehurst in the 1840s.

== Subsequent developments ==
His case was one of five from Ticehurst taken up by the Lunacy Law Reform Committee (founded 1873), the others being John William Thomas, Thomas Preston (d. 1877), Walter Marshall (b. 1837) and Herman Charles Merivale. Louisa Lowe, a former secretary of the Lunacy Law Reform Society (founded 1873) took up the story in her diatribe against private asylums, The Bastilles of England (1883).

The legislation under which he was incarcerated was replaced by the Lunacy Act 1890.

== See also ==
- Fludyer baronets

Baronetage of Great Britain
Preceded by Samuel Brudenell Fludyer	Baronet (of Lee Place); 1833–1876	Succeeded by John Henry Fludyer
