= Robert Wheatley (MP) =

16th-century English politician

Robert Wheatley (by 1517 – 1558 or later), of Cumbria and London, was an English politician.

== Family ==
He married, but his wife's name is unrecorded. They had two daughters, one of whom was called Anne.

== Education ==
Wheatley was possibly educated in law at Middle Temple.

== Career ==
He was a Member (MP) of the Parliament of England for Appleby in 1545 and 1547, for Carlisle in April 1554 and November 1554, and for Morpeth in 1558.
