= Amelia Bristow =

British writer (1783–1860)

- Born: Amelia Solomon; 19 July 1783; London, England
- Died: 18 March 1860 (aged 76); London, England
- Occupations: Novelist, editor
- Years active: 1820s–1840s
- Notable work: Emma de Lissau (1828); Sophia de Lissau (1829)
- Movement: Evangelical literature

Amelia Bristow (née Amelia Solomon; 1783–1860) was a British novelist active in the early nineteenth century. She is best known for writing fiction with religious and moral themes, including several novels advocating that Jews convert to Christianity. Bristow wrote evangelical fiction about conversion, morality, and Jewish identity. Scholars have discussed her novels in studies of nineteenth-century evangelical literature and representations of Jewish identity in British fiction.

== Early life ==
Amelia Solomon was born in London on 19 July 1783. She came from a Jewish family but converted to Christianity. She later married and published novels, first anonymously and later under the name Amelia Bristow.

== Literary career ==
Bristow began publishing novels in the 1820s. Her fiction dealt with religious conversion, family life, and the social roles of women. Her most notable works were conversion narratives including Emma de Lissau; or, The Sister's Choice (1828) and Sophia de Lissau (1829).

Bristow was also the editor of an evangelical periodical entitled The Christian Lady's Friend and Family Repository from 1831 to 1832.

== Reception ==
Bristow's novels found an audience among evangelical Christians in Great Britain, but her depictions of Judaism have been criticized by scholars. Efraim Sicher describes her fiction as presenting Jewish history through an evangelical Christian perspective in which Jews are portrayed as requiring conversion to Christianity. He also places her novels within a tradition of confessional and pseudo-autobiographical conversion narratives about Jewish women

Miriam Burstein and Michael Ragussis have also discussed Bristow's fiction in studies of nineteenth-century Protestant conversion literature and representations of Jews.

Nadia Valman argues that Bristow's conversion novels follow recurring narrative patterns and present Jewish religious life from an evangelical Christian perspective. According to Valman, Bristow's novels use Jewish conversion to affirm Christianity as the true faith.

Brenda Ayres argues that Emma de Lissau, like other conversionist novels of the period, depicts Judaism as "no longer a viable spiritual and ethical system, but merely a dead system of knowledge."

== Misattribution ==
There is disagreement about whether or not Bristow was the same person as "A. Bristow" who authored The Maniac, a work of Irish poetry published in 1810. While The Maniac is often attributed to Bristow, multiple scholars believe that Amelia Bristow and A. Bristow were different writers.

== Personal life and death ==
Bristow was married to a British clerk, who died in 1839. She requested financial assistance from the Royal Literary Fund, citing lack of royalties from her novels, unpaid work as an editor, and failing eyesight.

Bristow died in London on March 18, 1860.

== Selected publications ==
- The Faithful Servant; or, the History of Elizabeth Allen (1824)
- Emma de Lissau: A Narrative of Striking Vicissitudes and Peculiar Trials; With Notes Illustrative of the Manners and Customs of the Jews (1828)
- Sophia de Lissau: A Portraiture of the Jews, of the Nineteenth Century: Being an Outline of Their Religious and Domestic Habits: With Explanatory Notes (1829)
- The Scrap Book: Containing a Variety of Articles in Prose and Verse. Chiefly Original (1833)
- The Orphans of Lissau; and Other Narratives, Immediately Connected with Jewish Customs, Domestic and Religious: With Explanatory Notes (1845)
- Miriam and Rosette, or, The Twin Sisters: A Jewish Narrative of the Eighteenth Century (1847)

== See also ==
- Charlotte Maria Tucker
- Hesba Stretton
