= Richard Bristowe (MP) =

15th-century English politician

Richard Bristowe was a member of Parliament for Appleby in March 1416.
