= Joseph Savory =

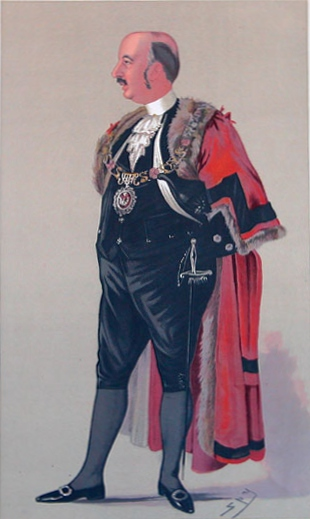
Sir Joseph Savory by Spy for Vanity Fair, 1890

Escutcheon of the Savory baronets of Buckhurst Park

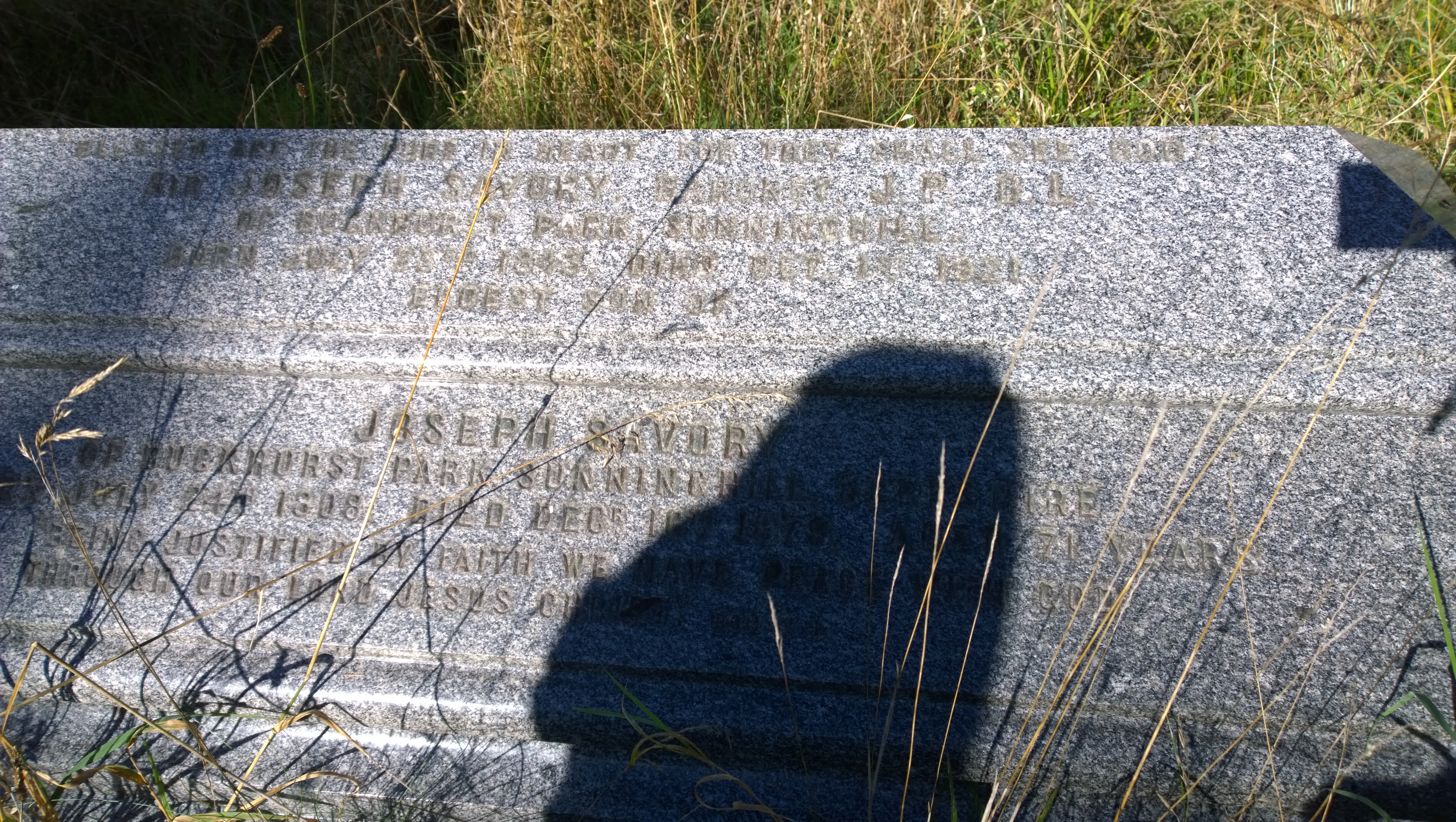
Grave of Sir Joseph Savory Lord Mayor of London

Sir Joseph Savory, 1st Baronet (23 July 1843 – 1 October 1921) was a Sheriff of London, Lord Mayor of London and MP.

He was born in Clapton, London, the eldest son of Joseph Savory of Buckhurst Park and Mary Caroline née Braithwaite, at Winkfield in Berkshire which he inherited in 1879. He was educated at Harrow School.

He joined the family business of A.B. Savory and Sons and became an alderman of the City of London for the Bridge Without ward. He was appointed Sheriff of London and Middlesex for 1882 and elected Lord Mayor of London for 1890. He was a J.P. and Deputy Lieutenant for Berkshire and for Westmorland, where he was Lord of the Manors of Wharton and Nateby. He was made a baronet on 14 September 1891. In 1892 he was returned as MP for Appleby until 1900.

He was involved in the management of the New River Company and the Royal Mail Steam Packet Company.

He made several improvements to the Buckhurst Park estate and was a lay preacher who took morning services at nearby Chavey Down and preached in South Ascot.

He married Helen Pemberton Leach, daughter of Col. Sir George Archibald Leach, in 1888. He is buried at St Mary's Church in Winkfield, Berkshire.

Civic offices
Preceded by Sir Henry Isaacs	562nd Lord Mayor of London; 1890–1891	Succeeded by David Evans
Parliament of the United Kingdom
Preceded by William Lowther	Member of Parliament for Appleby; 1892–1900	Succeeded by Richard Rigg
Baronetage of the United Kingdom
New creation	Baronet (of Buckhurst Park); 1891–1921	Extinct
Preceded by Stephen baronets	Savory baronets of Buckhurst Park; 14 September 1891	Succeeded by O'Brien baronets
