= Richard Rigg (British politician) =

British politician

Richard Rigg OBE

Member of Parliament for Appleby
- In office 1 October 1900 – 14 February 1905
- Preceded by: Joseph Savory
- Succeeded by: Leif Jones

Personal details
- Born: 27 August 1877 Windermere, Cumbria
- Died: 29 August 1942 (aged 65) Hove, East Sussex
- Party: Liberal (1900-1905) Conservative (1905-1942)
- Education: Gonville & Caius College

Richard Rigg OBE (27 August 1877 – 29 August 1942) was a British barrister and Liberal MP for Appleby, before defecting to the Conservative Party.

== Early life and education ==
Rigg was born in Windermere on 27 August 1877, the only son of innkeeper John Rigg (1845-1927) and his wife Sarah Ann Sutton (1852-1938). From 1896 he was a prominent volunteer with the 2nd (Westmorland) Volunteer Border Regiment, and was promoted to captain the following year. He studied at Gonville & Caius College at the University of Cambridge, graduating with a BA in 1900. In January 1899 he was called to the bar at the Inner Temple and was also a member of the King's Inn, Dublin. He also served in a wide range of public roles, including as president of Westmorland County Football Association.

== Political career ==
In 1899, the North Westmoreland Liberal Association invited Rigg to contest the Appleby division of Westmorland, which had been held by Conservative Sir Joseph Savory since 1892. He was publicly announced as the Liberal candidate for the constituency in September 1900, and was elected the following month. At 23, he became one of the youngest people to be elected as an MP, and was also the first Liberal to hold the Appleby seat since 1885.

However, Rigg resigned from the Liberal party in November 1904, citing his agreement with the Conservative government on many key issues. The Liberals selected Leif Jones as their candidate for the imminent by-election, and although campaigning began before Christmas, there was as yet no vacancy. Rigg claimed that the "ruffianism" of Liberals angry at his defection of the party had made him ill, and he went to an unnamed continental health resort to recover. He returned to England in February 1905, and resigned his seat on 11 February by becoming Steward of the Manor of Northstead, telling the annual dinner of the Carlisle Conservative Club "I am proud to be one of you now ... I have the satisfaction of feeling that what I have done was conscientious and right." At the resulting by-election, Jones held the seat, though with a reduced majority.

== Later career & military service ==
During the First World War, Rigg served with the Border Regiment, and was promoted to major. After the end of the war Rigg moved to London, and subsequently served as a councillor on Westminster Borough Council, representing Great Marlborough ward from February 1924 to November 1925, and St Margaret ward from February 1930 until his death. He was elected Mayor of Westminster for 1939–40. He was a member of the Municipal Reform Party, the local government wing of the Conservatives.

== Personal life & death ==
Rigg was married to Isabel Gertrude Ross Anderson in 1904, they had no children. Isabel died in July 1942, and Richard died the following month in Hove, East Sussex on 29 August 1942, two days after his 65th birthday.

Parliament of the United Kingdom
Preceded by Joseph Savory	Member of Parliament for Appleby; 1900 – 1905	Succeeded by Leif Jones
