= John Sowerby (MP) =

John Sowerby (fl. 1391–1411), of Appleby-in-Westmorland and Carlisle, Cumbria, was an English lawyer and Member of Parliament (MP).

He was a Member of the Parliament of England for Appleby in 1391, January 1397 and 1411, and for Carlisle in 1402.
