= St Mary the Virgin's Church, Ayston =

Coordinates: 52.5997°N 0.7325°W

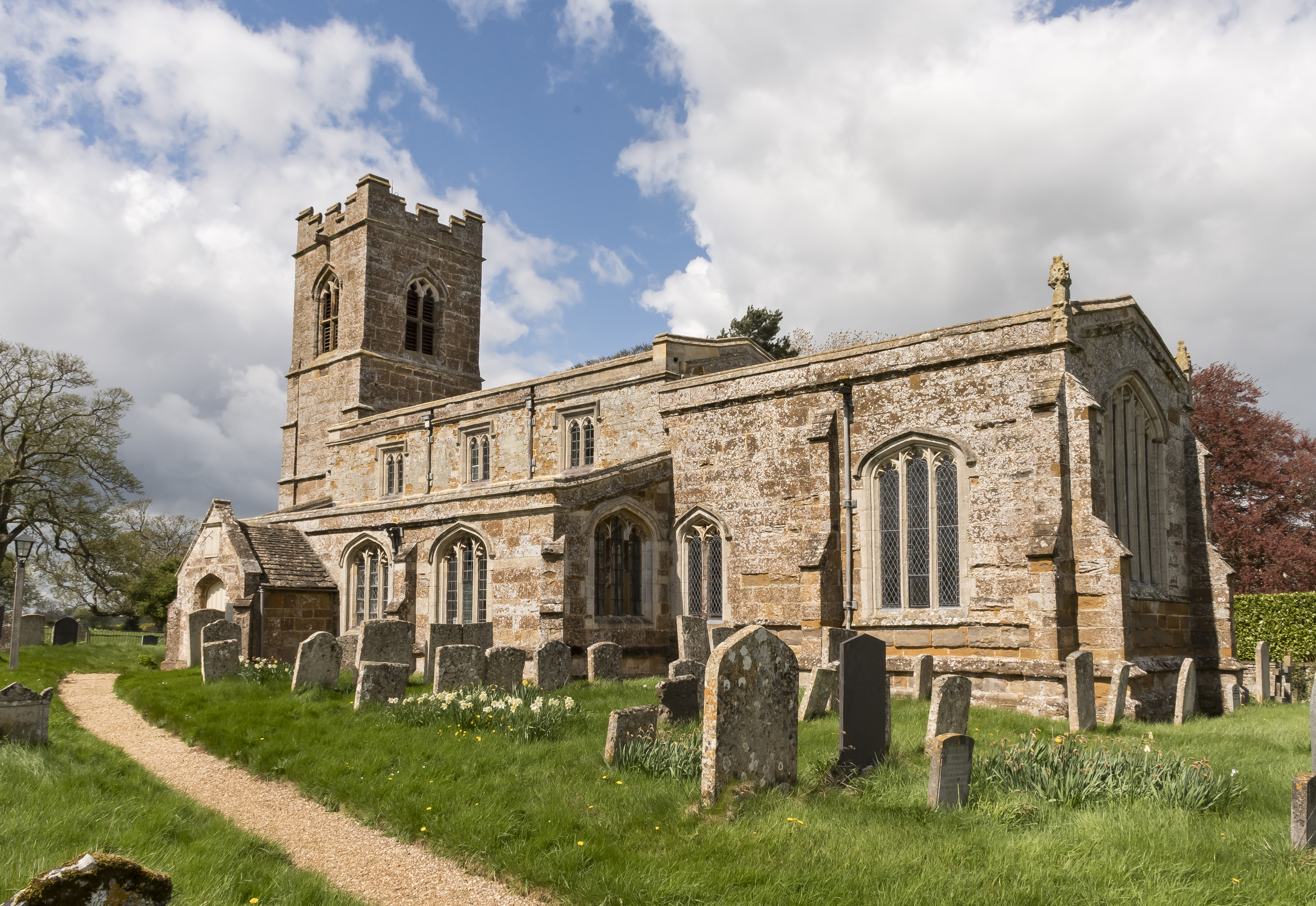

- Location in Rutland
- OS grid reference: SK 860 010
- Location: Ayston, Rutland
- Country: England
- Denomination: Anglican
- Website: Churches Conservation Trust

History
- Status: Former parish church

Architecture
- Functional status: Redundant
- Heritage designation: Grade II*
- Designated: 10 November 1955
- Architectural type: Church
- Style: Gothic
- Groundbreaking: 12th century
- Completed: 15th century

Specifications
- Materials: Stone, tile roof

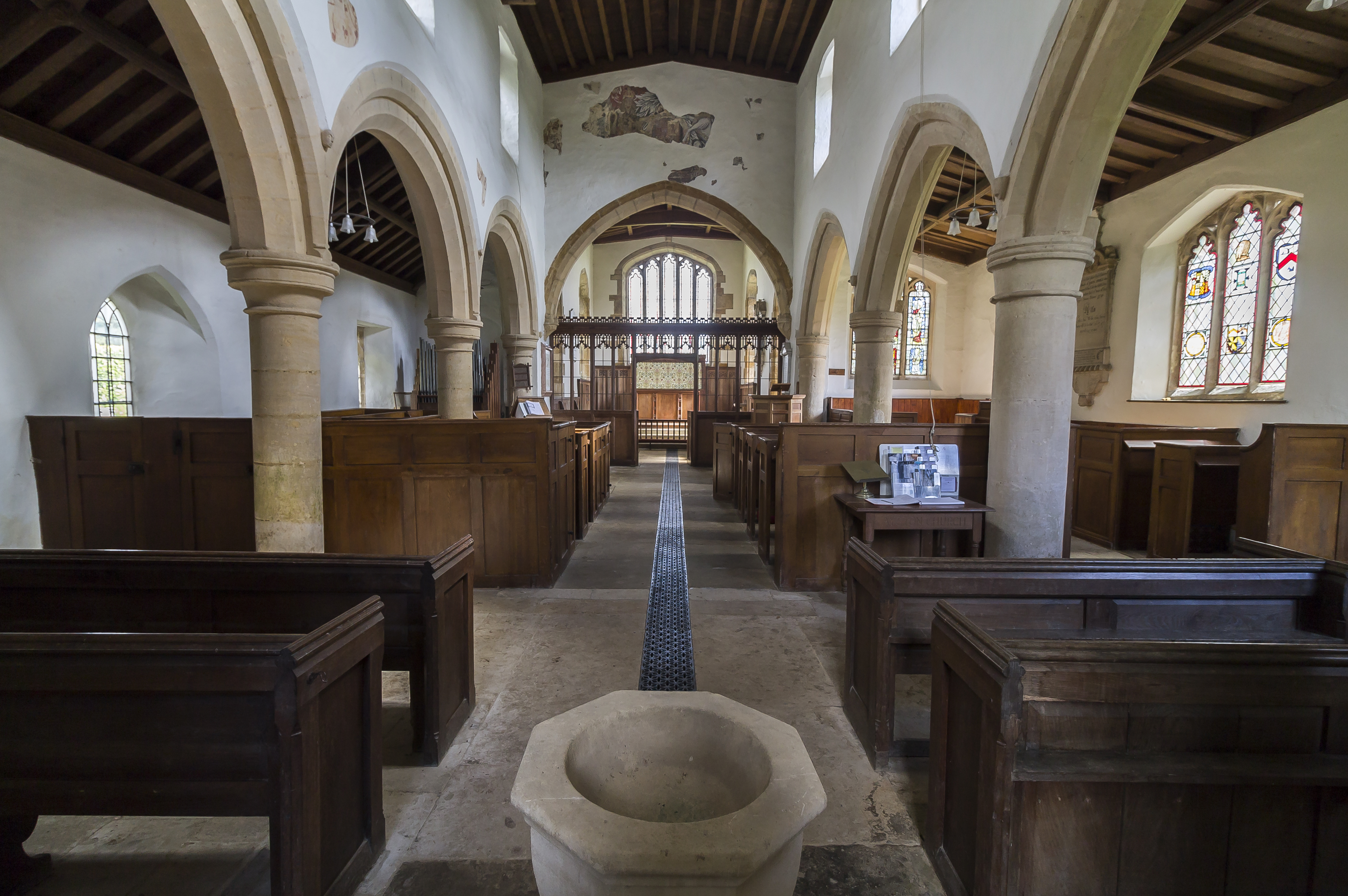
St Mary's church interior

St Mary the Virgin's Church is a redundant Anglican church in the village of Ayston, Rutland, England. It is recorded in the National Heritage List for England as a designated Grade II* listed building, and is under the care of the Churches Conservation Trust.

== History ==
The church dates from the 12th century, and much of its surviving fabric is from the 13th century. The oldest material, dating from the 12th century, is at the northwest corner of the church. The north aisle and arcade were built in the 13th century, followed by the south aisle, which was probably rebuilt and widened in the following century. The tower was also built in the 14th century, and about this time the clerestory was added. In the 15th century the chancel was rebuilt, new windows were inserted in the south aisle, and the porch was built.

By the early 21st century the size of the congregation worshipping in the church had dwindled and it was considered that it was no longer sustainable. In 2012 a final regular service in the church was held and the church was declared redundant on 1 June 2012. It was vested in the Churches Conservation Trust on 10 April 2014.

== Architecture ==
St Mary's is built in rubble stone and has tiled roofs. It consists of a nave with a clerestory, north and south aisles, a chancel, a south porch, and a west tower. The tower has corner buttresses, paired bell openings, and an embattled parapet. Its west window contains Decorated Y-tracery. In the north aisle is a lancet window. The other windows are Perpendicular in style; along the aisles and clerestory they have two or three lights, and the east window has five lights.

Inside the church the arcades are carried on circular piers; the north arcade has round-headed arches, and the arches in the south arcade are pointed. In the north wall of the chancel is an aumbry, and in the south wall is a piscina. In the nave are 18th-century box pews, and a font on a pedestal. On the walls are the remains of wall paintings, including a royal coat of arms over the chancel arch, and some floral decoration on the north wall of the nave. In the north aisle is a worn monument with the effigies of a knight and a lady. One of the windows in the south aisle contains some 15th-century stained glass. The pipe organ has a single manual, and was made in about 1890 by W. R. Andrew. There is a ring of four bells, the oldest dating from about 1365, and the others from about 1550, from 1626, and from 1877.

== See also ==
- Grade II* listed buildings in Rutland
- List of churches preserved by the Churches Conservation Trust in the English Midlands
