= George Fludyer =

English MP

Arms of Fludyer: Sable, a cross patoncée between four escallops argent each charged with a cross patoncée of the field

George Fludyer (16 September 1761 – 15 April 1837) was an English politician, the Member of Parliament for Chippenham from 1782 to 1802, and for Appleby from 1818 to 1819.

== Early life ==
Born in St Michael Bassishaw parish in London in 1761, he was the second son of Sir Samuel Fludyer, 1st Baronet, who died in 1768. His mother Caroline Brudenell was daughter of James Brudenell, and the niece of George Brudenell, 3rd Earl of Cardigan.

Fludyer inherited wealth from his father, one of the richest clothiers of his time, and social rank from his mother. He was educated at Westminster School from 1771–9, and sent on the Grand Tour with his elder brother, Samuel.

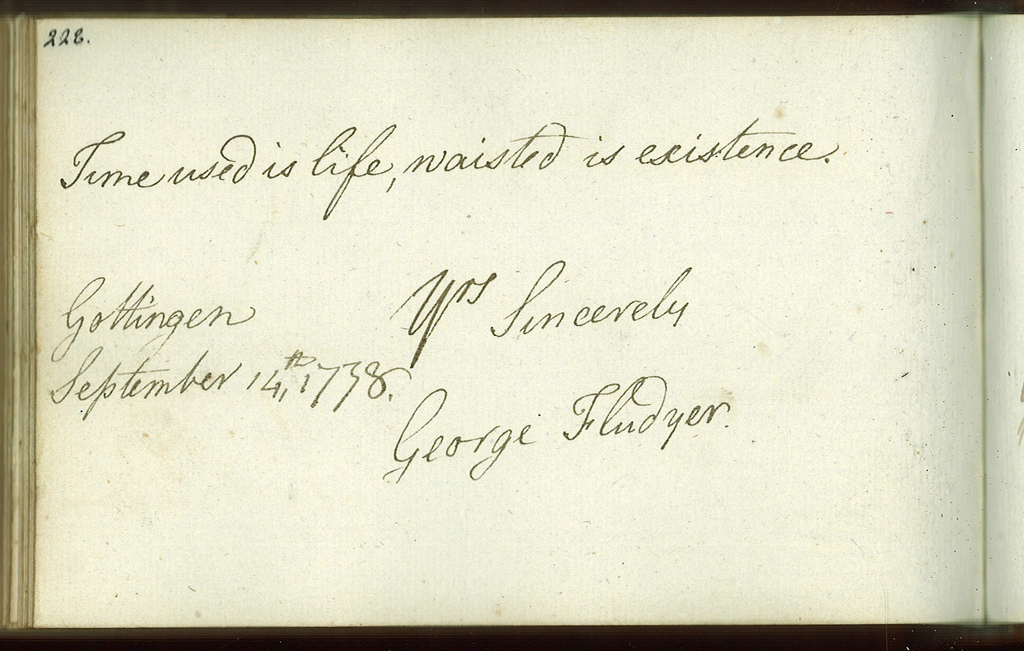
Album entry by George Fludyer at Göttingen in 1778, for Johan David af Sandeberg

== Public life ==
Fludyer inherited the interests of his father, Sir Samuel, at Chippenham, which he represented from 1783 to 1802. He is referred to, as F——r, in a political cartoon of 1784, which caricatures John Robinson, Treasury Secretary to the Fox–North coalition, offering bribes to MPs.

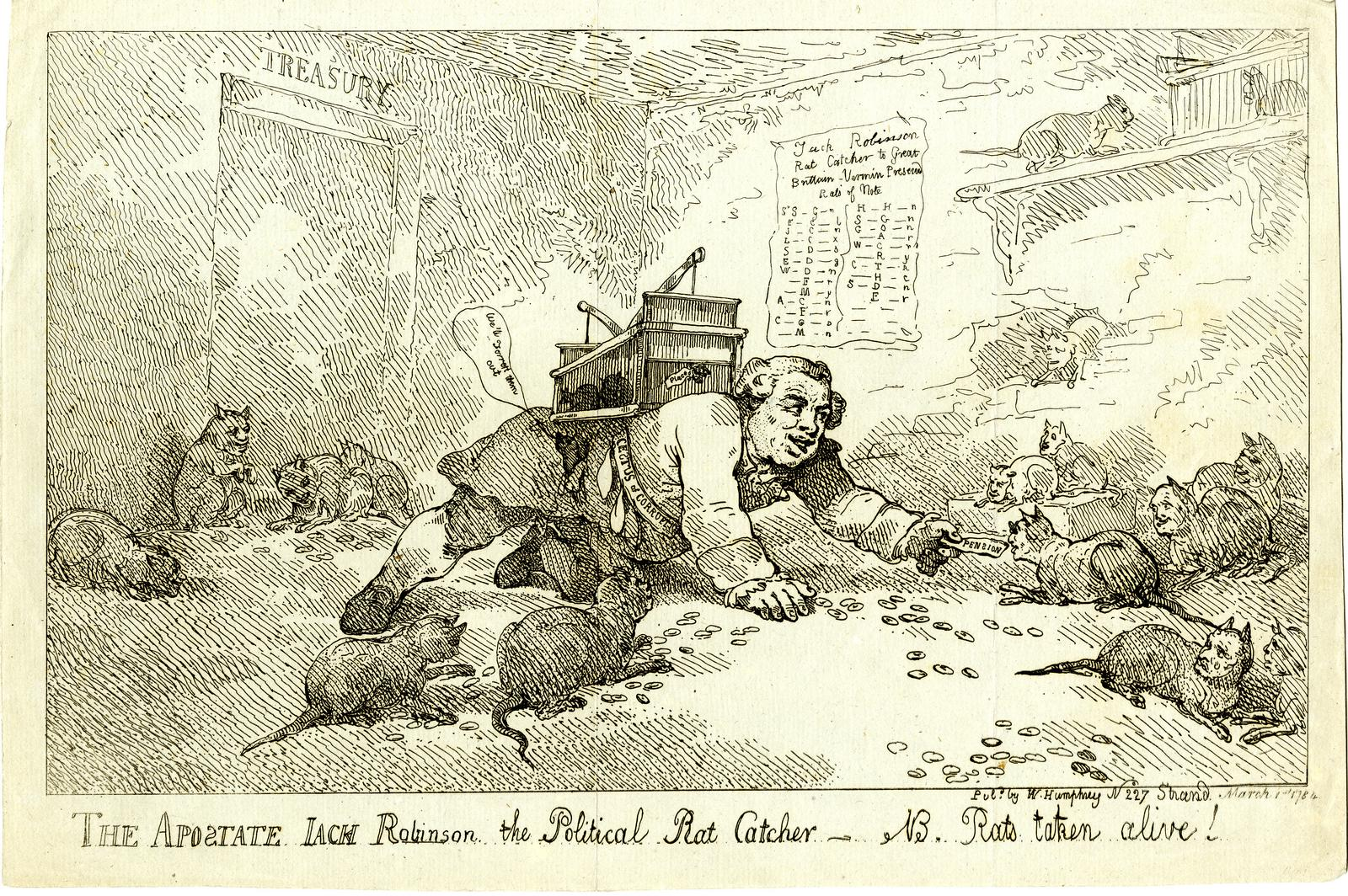
The apostate Jack R- the political rat catcher, political caricature of 1784

Fludyer fell out with the Corporation of Chippenham and gave his interest there to John Maitland. He served as a stopgap member for Appleby in 1818–19 at the behest of William Lowther, 1st Earl of Lonsdale, a family connection (the Earl was married to another daughter of the 9th Earl of Westmorland).

Fludyer served in the Rutland Yeomanry Cavalry, from 1794, becoming a major in 1794. He served as Sheriff of Rutland for 1814–15, and as a magistrate for over 50 years.

== Marriage, family life and residences ==
In 1792, Fludyer married Lady Mary Fane, daughter of John Fane, 9th Earl of Westmorland. They had four daughters and three sons. These were:

- Mary (died 1830), married in 1818 Arthur George Onslow, and became Countess of Onslow.
- Caroline (died 1824), married in 1818 John Cust, 1st Earl Brownlow, as his second wife. In a marriage of first cousins, her daughter Katherine Anne married a son Arthur George Onslow (1820–1856), courtesy title Viscount Cranley, of her sister Mary.
- Elizabeth, married in 1824 Sir Philip Musgrave, 8th Baronet, who died in 1827.
- George (died 1856), wounded at the Battle of Waterloo serving with the 1st Regiment of Foot Guards.
- Katharine.
- William.
- John Henry, a cleric, who inherited in 1876 the title from his cousin Sir Samuel Fludyer, 3rd Baronet, becoming Sir John Henry Fludyer, 4th Baronet.

The second baronet owned a house at Lee, Kent, and another in Fludyer Street, parallel to Downing Street in Westminster. In 1797, George Fludyer is recorded as living in Thistleton, in Rutland.

Fludyer moved to be near the family of his mother, Caroline, who died in 1803. In 1801, she inherited land at Ayston from her brother, George Brydges Brudenell; and with it the patronage of livings in the two villages. On her death, Fludyer inherited land at Ayston and Wardley. In 1807 he had a large house, Ayston Hall, built near the church in Ayston, and lived there until he died.

Parliament of Great Britain
Preceded by Henry Dawkins; Giles Hudson	Member of Parliament for Chippenham; 1783-1802	Succeeded by James Dawkins; Charles Brooke; John Maitland
Preceded by James Lowther; George Tierney	Member of Parliament for Appleby; 1818-1819	Succeeded by Lucius Concannon; Adolphus John Dalrymple
