= Robert Gare =

English politician

Robert Gare (fl. 1392 – 1421) was an English politician and lawyer. He sat as MP for Appleby in 1395 and 1402. He also served as sheriff of York from Michaelmas 1409 till 1410.

== Family ==
He was the son and heir of Robert Gare (died by December 1399) and Emma (died by December 1399). He married Alice by March 1405.

== Biography ==
Robert Gare began his career as a lawyer in February 1392 when he agreed to guarantee a payment for someone who was renting property in Cornwall from the Crown after the property had temporarily become Crown property. In 1393, he acted as a mainpernor for a York merchant being sued for debt in the court of Chancery. In 1416, John Prophet appointed Robert as one of the executors of his will.
