= John Overdo =

English Member of Parliament

John Overdo (fl.1383-1386), of Appleby, Westmorland, was an English Member of Parliament (MP).

He was a Member of the Parliament of England for Appleby in February 1383, April 1384 and 1386.
