= Adam Crosby (MP) =

English lawyer and politician

Adam Crosby (died by 1399), of Appleby-in-Westmorland, was an English lawyer and Member of Parliament (MP).

He was a Member of the Parliament of England for Appleby in January 1377, 1381, May 1382, 1385 and February 1388.
