= Naomi Bristow =

- Born: 4 October 1997 (age 29)
- Occupations: Musician, singer
- Years active: 2007 - present

Naomi Bristow (born 4 October 1997) is a country music artist from Beeton, Ontario, Canada.

== Early life ==
Her family was involved in rodeo, which led her down the path of country and western culture.

== Career ==
Bristow has opened for artists including Gene Watson, Johnny Reid, David Frizzell, Moe Bandy, Ronda Vincent, Charlie Daniels, Marty Stuart, Jim Ed Brown, George Canyon, Bobby Bare, and Dean Brody.

Naomi Bristow's Easter version of "Hallelujah" (new lyrics by Kelley Mooney) went viral in the Spring of 2019 and reached 14 million views on Facebook. The song is a cover of the song written and recorded by Leonard Cohen in 1984.

In 2019, Bristow was invited to go on tour with the Scott Woods Band, performing 90 shows in 95 days. She was featured in the top 200 across Canada on Canada's Got Talent (2012). Bristow is a regular on Midwest Country Show and was featured on three seasons of the Shotgun Red Variety Show. Bristow recorded in Nashville with Grand Ole Opry stars Jim Ed Brown, and Richard Sterban. She recorded a Gospel CD with Vince Gill and a Christmas CD with Bill Anderson.

In the spring of 2008, Bristow recorded her first album, Cowboy Sweetheart, followed by The Yodelin' Cowgirl, in late 2008, and then Ridin' High, in 2009. Ridin' High was awarded the Traditional Yodel Album of the Year 2010 by the National Traditional Country Music Association in the United States.

Her fourth CD Lookin' Back was recorded in Nashville, Tennessee. Bristow sang two duets with Jim Ed Brown. In the spring of 2011, Bristow recorded her fifth studio album, Lovin' the Ride featuring Brown and Richard Sterban from the Oakridge Boys. In March 2012 Bristow recorded her most memorable CD, Blessed Trails.

Bristow released her seventh album with a collection of all her yodeling songs, Yee Haw Yodelin. In 2013, she released her first DVD, The Heart of a Cowgirl with live performances and tapings from television shows.

A mixture of traditional country music is featured on Naomi's CD, Stayin’ On Track, released in 2014. Bristow released an album in 2015 of yodeling songs titled, Just Yodelin. She released Yodelin’ Christmas with an assortment of Christmas songs and some yodeling. Whisperin’ Bill Anderson offered his song, Po Folks Christmas as a duet with her.

She was in the top 20 of Canada's Got Talent.

== Recognition ==
Her talents have been recognized in many venues:

- Traditional Female Rising Star award at the Josie Music Awards (2017)
- Fans Choice Award at the Havelock Country Jamboree
- BC Cowboy Heritage award
- Two-time Youth Yodeler of the Yea (Western Music Association)

== Discography ==
Year	Album
2007	Cowboy Sweetheart
2008	The Yodelin' Cowgirl
2009	Ridin' High
2010	Lookin' Back (Feat. Jim Ed Brown)
2011	Lovin' the Ride (Feat. Jim Ed Brown & Richard Sterban)
2012	Blessed Trails (Feat. Vince Gill)
2012	The Heart of the Cowgirl (DVD)
2014	Stayin' On Track
2016	Yodelin' Christmas (Feat. Bill Anderson)
2020	You're Lookin' At Country
