= Henry William Bristow =

English geologist and naturalist (1817–1889)

Henry William Bristow (17 May 1817 – 14 June 1889) was an English geologist and naturalist.

== Life ==
He was born in London on 17 May 1817. He was the son of Major-general Henry Bristow, a member of a Wiltshire family, and his wife Elizabeth Atchorne of High Wycombe. After passing with distinction through King's College, London, he joined the staff of the Geological Survey in 1842, and was set to work in Radnorshire. From this county he was shortly afterwards transferred to the Cotteswold district, which he examined up to Bath, and afterwards surveyed a large part of Dorset, Wiltshire, and Hampshire, with the Isle of Wight, besides some of the Wealden area, Berkshire, and Essex, rising ultimately in 1872 to the position of director for England and Wales. His field work was admirable in quality, for he was no less patient than accurate in unravelling a complicated district — one of those men, in short, who lay the foundations on which his successors can build, and whose services to British geology are more lasting than showy.

He retired from the survey in July 1888 and died on 14 June 1889.

He was elected F.G.S. in 1843 and F.R.S. in 1862, was an honorary member of sundry societies, and received the order of SS. Maurice and Lazarus.

== Works ==
His separate papers are few in number — about eight — and during his later years he suffered from deafness, which prevented him from taking part in the business of societies. But his mark is made on several of the maps and other publications of the Geological Survey, more especially in the memoir of parts of Berkshire and Hampshire (a joint production), and in that admirable one, The Geology of the Isle of Wight, almost all of which was from his pen. He contributed also to sundry publications, official and otherwise, and wrote or edited the following books: 1. Glossary of Mineralogy, 1861. 2. Underground Life (translation, with additions of La Vie Souterraine, by L. Simonin), 1869. 3. The World before the Deluge (a translation, with additions, of a work by L. Figuier), 1872.

== Family ==
On 22 October 1863 he married Eliza Harrison, second daughter of David Harrison, a London solicitor, and to them four children were born, two sons and as many daughters; they and the widow surviving him.

== Honours and awards ==
Bristow was elected F.R.S. in 1862. A road in Cheylesmore, Coventry UK is named after him.
