= George Bristow =

George Bristow may refer to:

- George Bristow (ornithologist) (1863–1947), English taxidermist, gunsmith and ornithologist
- George Frederick Bristow (1825–1898), American composer
- George W. Bristow (1894–1961), American jurist
- George Bristow (baseball) (1870–1939), American baseball player
- George Bristow (footballer) (1933–2010), English footballer
- George Bristow (soccer) (fl. 1920s), Australian soccer player
