= Henry Finch (cricketer) =

English cricketer

Personal information
- Full name: Henry Randolph Finch
- Born: 18 October 1842; Paddington, Middlesex, England
- Died: 6 December 1935 (aged 93); Oakham, Rutland, England
- Batting: Unknown

Domestic team information
- Years: Team
- 1866: Marylebone Cricket Club

Career statistics
Competition	First-class
Matches	2
Runs scored	34
Batting average	17.00
100s/50s	–/–
Top score	19
Catches/stumpings	–/–
- Source: Cricinfo, 26 February 2020

Henry Randolph Finch JP (18 October 1842 – 6 December 1935) was an English first-class cricketer and barrister.

The son of Henry Finch, he was born in October 1842 at Paddington. He was educated at Harrow School, before matriculating at Balliol College, Oxford in 1861, where he graduated B.A. in 1866. He played first-class cricket for Southgate against Oxford University in 1864 at Oxford, before playing a first-class match for the Marylebone Cricket Club against Hampshire at Southampton in 1866. A student of the Inner Temple, he was called to the bar in April 1868 and practised on the Midland Circuit. Finch also served as a land agent and a justice of the peace for Rutland. He died in Rutland at Oakham in December 1935.
