= Appleby (constituency) =

Parliamentary constituency in the United Kingdom, 1885–1918

- Former county constituency for the House of Commons
- County: Westmorland
- Borough: Appleby-in-Westmorland
- Major settlements: Appleby-in-Westmorland

1885–1918
- Seats: 1
- Created from: Westmorland
- Replaced by: Westmorland

1295–1832
- Seats: 2
- Type of constituency: borough constituency
- Created from: Westmorland
- Replaced by: Westmorland

Appleby was a parliamentary constituency in the county of Westmorland in England. It existed for two separate periods: from 1295 to 1832, and from 1885 to 1918.

Appleby was enfranchised as parliamentary borough in 1295, and abolished by the Great Reform Act 1832. It returned two Members of Parliament (MPs) using the bloc vote system. It was represented in the House of Commons of England until the Acts of Union 1707, in the House of Commons of Great Britain from 1707 to 1800, and finally in the House of Commons of the United Kingdom from 1801 to 1832. Its best-known MP was William Pitt the Younger who became prime minister in 1783 at the age of 24.

For the 1885 general election the Redistribution of Seats Act 1885 created a county constituency of the same name, which returned a single MP elected by the first-past-the-post system. The county constituency was abolished at the 1918 general election.

== History ==
=== The borough (1295–1832) ===
The parliamentary borough of Appleby consisted of the town of Appleby, the county town of Westmorland, and was consistently represented in the House of Commons from the Model Parliament of 1295 until the Reform Act 1832.

The right to vote rested with the occupiers of around a hundred burgage tenements. By the 18th century, the majority of the burgages were owned by the Lowther and Tufton families, which enabled them to put in reliable tenants at election time and ensure their complete control of who was elected. The seats were frequently kept for members of those families, but Appleby's other representatives included William Pitt the Younger, who was MP for Appleby when he became prime minister in 1783 (although he stood down at the following general election when he was instead elected for Cambridge University).

A later member for Appleby was Viscount Howick, subsequently (as Earl Grey) the Prime Minister whose administration passed the Great Reform Act 1832; but Grey's history as a former MP for the town did not save it from losing both its members under the act. Appleby was regarded as a classic example of a pocket borough, completely in the control of its owners who were also the major local landowners, and with a population of only 1,233 at the 1831 census unlikely to be freed from their influence even by widening the franchise. Nevertheless, as the only county town to be disfranchised, Appleby was one of the more controversial cases in the debates on the reform bill, the opposition making unsuccessful attempts to amend the bill so as to save at least one of its MPs.

After abolition the borough was absorbed into the Westmorland county constituency.

=== The county constituency (1885–1918) ===
The Appleby constituency created for the 1885 election was, in full, "The Appleby or Northern Division of Westmorland", and was sometimes referred to as Westmorland North. It consisted of the whole of the northern half of the county, including the towns of Ambleside, Grasmere and Kirkby Stephen. It was abolished at the 1918 general election, the whole county henceforth being united in a single Westmorland constituency.

== Members of Parliament ==
=== MPs 1295–1660 ===
Parliament	First member	Second member
1382	William Soulby	
1385	William Soulby	
1386	Robert Overdo I	John Overdo
1388 (Feb)	William Soulby	Adam Crosby
1388 (Sep)		
1390 (Jan)		
1390 (Nov)		
1391	William Soulby	John Sowerby
1393		
1394		
1395	Robert Gare	William Savage
1397 (Jan)	John Helton	John Sowerby
1397 (Sep)	Christopher Curwen	Thomas Chamberlain
1399	Thomas Warcop	William Crackenthorpe I
1401		
1402	Robert Gare	Robert Overdo II
1404 (Jan)		
1404 (Oct)		
1406	John Ninezergh	William Crackenthorpe II
1407	John Sagher	John Pray
1410		
1411	John Helton	John Sowerby
1413 (Feb)		
1413 (May)	Robert Sandford	Thomas Stockdale
1414 (Apr)		
1414 (Nov)	Robert Crackenthorpe	John Birkrig
1415	Roland Thornburgh	John Birkrig
1416 (Mar)	Richard Bristowe	Thomas Manningham
1416 (Oct)		
1417	Thomas Stockdale	John Birkrig
1419	Richard Wharton	Thomas Pety
1420	William Lowther	Nicholas Stanshawe
1421 (May)	William Scalby	Nicholas Stanshawe
1421 (Dec)	John Booth	Nicholas Stanshawe 1436-1427 Thomas Wharton
1510–1523	No names known	
1529	Sir Richard Tempest	Sir Thomas Wharton
1536	?	
1539	?	
1542	Cuthbert Horsley	Thomas Jolye
1545	Thomas Jolye	Robert Wheatley
1547	Thomas Jolye, died and replaced Jan 1552 by George Clifford	Robert Wheatley
1553 (Mar)	?	
1553 (Oct)	George Clifford	James Bankes
1554 (Apr)	John Eltoftes	William Danby
1554 (Nov)	John Eltoftes	William Danby
1555	?	
1558	John Eltoftes	Nicholas Purslow
1559 (Jan)	John Eltoftes	Christopher Monckton
1562/3	Christopher Monckton	Robert Atkinson
1571	John Layton	Richard Wroth
1572 (Apr)	George Frevile	Robert Bowes
1584 (Nov)	George Ireland	Henry Macwilliam
1586	James Ryther	Robert Constable
1588	Laurence Lister	Thomas Musgrave; Robert Warcop; Anthony Felton; Election declared void, 11 Feb 1589
1589	Ralph Bowes	Thomas Posthumous Hoby
1593	Thomas Posthumous Hoby	Cuthbert Reynolds
1597 (Sep)	James Colbrand	John Lyly
1601 (Oct)	John Morice	Thomas Caesar
1604	John Morice	Sir William Bowyer
1614	Sir George Savile, junior	Sir Henry Wotton
1621	Sir Arthur Ingram	Thomas Hughes
1624	Sir Arthur Ingram	Thomas Hughes
1625	Sir John Hotham sat for Beverley – not replaced	Thomas Hughes
1626	Sir William Slingsby	William Ashton
1628	William Ashton	Richard Lowther
1629–1640	No Parliaments convened	
1640 (Apr)	Richard Boyle	Richard Lowther
1640 (Nov)	Sir John Brooke (Royalist) – disabled March 1643	Richard Boyle (Royalist) ennobled, September 1642
1645	Richard Salwey	Henry Ireton
1648	Richard Salwey	Henry Ireton died November 1651
1653	Appleby unrepresented in the Barebones Parliament	
1654	Appleby unrepresented in the First Parliament of the Protectorate	
1656	Appleby unrepresented in the Second Parliament of the Protectorate	
1659	Adam Baynes	Nathaniel Redding

=== MPs 1660–1832 ===
Year	First member	First party	Second member	Second party
1660	Sir Henry Cholmley		Christopher Clapham	
1661	John Lowther		John Dalston	
1668	Thomas Tufton	Tory	John Dalston	
1679	Richard Tufton		Anthony Lowther	
January 1681	Sackville Tufton		Anthony Lowther	
February 1681	Sackville Tufton		Sir John Bland	
1685	Sackville Tufton		Philip Musgrave	
January 1689	Richard Lowther		Philip Musgrave	
July 1689	Richard Lowther		William Cheyne	
1690	Hon. Charles Boyle		William Cheyne	
1694	Sir John Walter		William Cheyne	
1695	Sir William Twysden		Sir Christopher Musgrave	
1697	Sir John Walter		Sir Christopher Musgrave	
1698	Sir John Walter		Gervase Pierrepont	
1701	Wharton Dunch		Gervase Pierrepont	
1702	James Grahme		Gervase Pierrepont	
1705	James Grahme		William Harvey	
1708	Nicholas Lechmere		Edward Duncombe	
1710	Thomas Lutwyche		Edward Duncombe	
1713	Thomas Lutwyche		Sir Richard Sandford, Bt.	
1722	Sackville Tufton	Tory	Sir Richard Sandford, Bt.	
1723 by-election (Note: The by-election in 1723 was due to the death of Sir Richard Sandford, Bt.)	Sackville Tufton	Tory	James Lowther	Whig
1727 by-election	Sackville Tufton	Tory	John Ramsden	Ind. Whig
1730 by-election (Note: The by-election in 1730 was due to Tufton succeeding to the peerage as Earl of Thanet.)	Walter Plumer	Whig	John Ramsden	Ind. Whig
1741	George Dodington (Note: In 1741, Dodington was also elected for Bridgwater, which he chose to represent, and never sat for Appleby.)	Whig	John Ramsden	Ind. Whig
1742 by-election	Sir Charles Wyndham, Bt		John Ramsden	Ind. Whig
1747	Randle Wilbraham		John Ramsden	Ind. Whig
1754 (Note: At the 1754 election, Lee and Honywood defeated Sir John Ramsden and Fletcher Norton, but this election was subsequently declared void and a by-election held in February 1756, at which Norton rather than Lee was elected.)	William Lee		Philip Honywood	
1756 by-election	Fletcher Norton		Philip Honywood	
1761	John Stanwix		Philip Honywood	
1767 by-election (Note: The 1767 by-election was due to the death of Stanwix, who was drowned while returning from Ireland.)	Charles Jenkinson	Whig	Philip Honywood	
1773 by-election (Note: The 1773 by-election was due to the resignation of Jenkinson.)	Fletcher Norton the younger		Philip Honywood	
1774	George Johnstone	Independent	Philip Honywood	
1780	William Lowther (Note: In 1780, Lowther was also elected for Carlisle, which he chose to represent, and never sat for Appleby, causing a by-election in 1781.)	Tory	Philip Honywood	
1781 by-election	Hon. William Pitt	Whig	Philip Honywood	
1784	Hon. John Leveson-Gower		Richard Penn	
1790	Hon. Robert Jenkinson (Note: Jenkinson was also elected for Rye, which he chose to represent, and never sat for Appleby.)	Tory	Richard Ford	Tory
January 1791 by-election	Hon. William Grimston		Richard Ford	Tory
May 1791 by-election (Note: The May 1791 by-election was caused by the resignation of Richard Ford.)	Hon. William Grimston		Hon. John Rawdon	
1796	Hon. John Tufton		John Courtenay	
1799 by-election (Note: The 1799 by-election was caused by the death of Hon. John Tufton.)	Robert Adair	Whig	John Courtenay	
1802	Sir Philip Francis	Whig	John Courtenay	
May 1807	Charles Grey	Whig	James Cuthbert	Whig
July 1807 by-election (Note: The July 1807 by-election was caused by the resignation of Charles Grey to contest a vacancy in Tavistock.)	Nicholas Ridley-Colborne	Whig	James Cuthbert	Whig
October 1812	James Lowther	Tory	John Courtenay	Whig
December 1812 by-election (Note: The December 1812 by-election was caused by the resignation of John Courtenay.)	James Lowther	Tory	George Tierney	Whig
1818	George Fludyer	Tory	Lucius Concannon	Whig
1819 by-election (Note: The 1819 by-election was caused by the resignation of George Fludyer.)	Adolphus Dalrymple	Tory	Lucius Concannon	Whig
March 1820	Adolphus Dalrymple	Tory	George Tierney (Note: Tierney was also elected for Knaresborough, which he chose to represent, and never sat for Appleby.)	Whig
May 1820 by-election	Adolphus Dalrymple	Tory	Thomas Creevey	Whig
1826	Hon. Henry Tufton	Whig	James Maitland	Tory
May 1832 by-election (Note: The by-election in May 1832 was due to Henry Tufton succeeding to the peerage as Earl of Thanet.)	Charles Henry Foster Barham	Whig	James Maitland	Tory
1832	constituency abolished by the Great Reform Act			

=== MPs 1885–1918 ===
Year	Member	Party
1885	Hon. William Lowther	Conservative
1892	Sir Joseph Savory	Conservative
1900	Richard Rigg	Liberal
1905	Leif Jones	Liberal
1910	Lancelot Sanderson	Conservative
1915	Cecil Lowther	Conservative
1918	constituency abolished	

== Election results 1885–1918 ==
=== Elections in the 1880s ===
General election 1885: Appleby
Party	Candidate	Votes	%	±%
Conservative	William Lowther	2,694	50.1	
Liberal	James Whitehead	2,684	49.9	
Majority		10	0.2	
Turnout		5,378	89.3	
Registered electors		6,022		
Conservative win (new seat)				

General election 1886: Appleby
Party	Candidate	Votes	%	±%
Conservative	William Lowther	2,748	51.8	+1.7
Liberal	James Whitehead	2,562	48.2	−1.7
Majority		186	3.6	+3.4
Turnout		5,310	88.2	−1.1
Registered electors		6,022		
Conservative hold		Swing	+1.7	

=== Elections in the 1890s ===
General election 1892: Appleby
Party	Candidate	Votes	%	±%
Conservative	Joseph Savory	2,963	56.8	+5.0
Liberal	Alfred Charles Tufton	2,256	43.2	−5.0
Majority		707	13.6	+10.0
Turnout		5,219	80.5	−7.7
Registered electors		6,481		
Conservative hold		Swing	+5.0	

General election 1895: Appleby
Party	Candidate	Votes	%	±%
Conservative	Joseph Savory	2,950	58.7	+1.9
Liberal	Theodore Wilfrid Fry	2,077	41.3	−1.9
Majority		873	17.4	+3.8
Turnout		5,027	79.6	−0.9
Registered electors		6,316		
Conservative hold		Swing	+1.9	

=== Elections in the 1900s ===
Rigg

General election 1900: Appleby
Party	Candidate	Votes	%	±%
Liberal	Richard Rigg	2,835	55.7	+14.4
Conservative	Joseph Savory	2,256	44.3	−14.4
Majority		579	11.4	N/A
Turnout		5,091	75.5	−4.1
Registered electors		6,744		
Liberal gain from Conservative		Swing	+14.4	

Jones

1905 Appleby by-election
Party	Candidate	Votes	%	±%
Liberal	Leif Jones	2,922	52.0	−3.7
Conservative	George Noble	2,702	48.0	+3.7
Majority		220	4.0	−7.4
Turnout		5,624	84.3	+8.8
Registered electors		6,670		
Liberal hold		Swing	−3.7	

General election 1906: Appleby
Party	Candidate	Votes	%	±%
Liberal	Leif Jones	2,890	50.1	−5.6
Conservative	Henry Petty-Fitzmaurice	2,882	49.9	+5.6
Majority		8	0.2	−11.2
Turnout		5,785	88.4	+8.9
Registered electors		6,528		
Liberal hold		Swing	−5.6	

- Figures are those following a recount

=== Elections in the 1910s ===
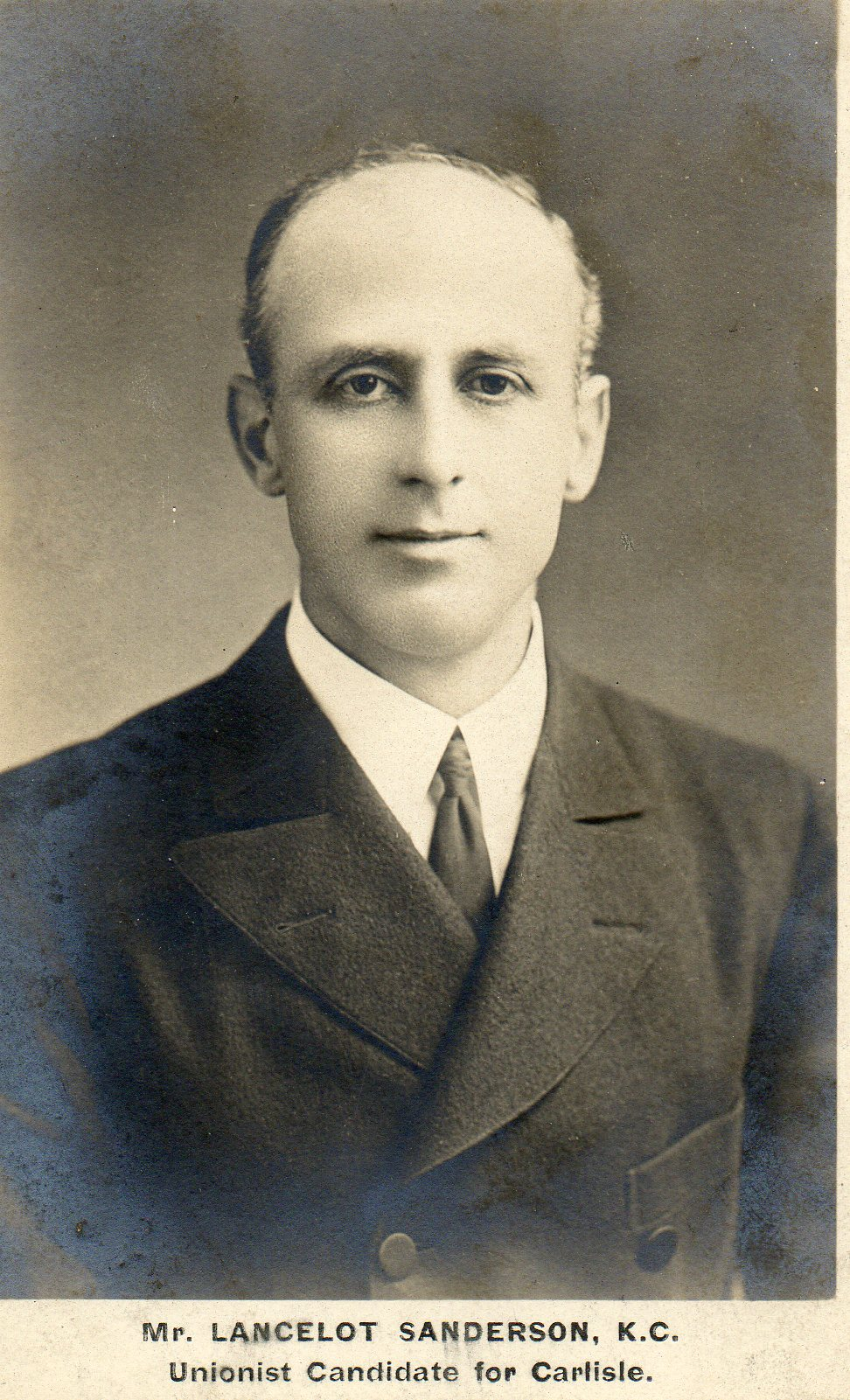
Sanderson

General election January 1910: Appleby
Party	Candidate	Votes	%	±%
Conservative	Lancelot Sanderson	3,335	53.8	+3.9
Liberal	Leif Jones	2,868	46.2	−3.9
Majority		467	7.6	N/A
Turnout		6,203	93.2	+4.8
Registered electors		6,656		
Conservative gain from Liberal		Swing	+3.9	

Wilson

General election December 1910: Appleby
Party	Candidate	Votes	%	±%
Conservative	Lancelot Sanderson	3,258	54.9	+1.1
Liberal	Philip Wilson	2,679	45.1	−1.1
Majority		579	9.8	+2.2
Turnout		5,937	89.2	−4.0
Registered electors		6,656		
Conservative hold		Swing	+1.1	

General Election 1914/15:

Another General Election was required to take place before the end of 1915. The political parties had been making preparations for an election to take place and by July 1914, the following candidates had been selected;

- Unionist: Lancelot Sanderson
- Liberal:

1915 Appleby by-election
Party	Candidate	Votes	%	±%
Unionist	Cecil Lowther (politician)	Unopposed		
Unionist hold				

== Election results before 1832 ==
=== Elections in the 1830s ===
By-election, 24 May 1832: Appleby
Party	Candidate	Votes	%
Whig	Charles Henry Foster Barham	Unopposed	
Registered electors		c. 99	
Whig hold			

- Caused by Tufton's succession to the peerage, becoming 11th Earl of Thanet

General election, 3 May 1831: Appleby
Party	Candidate	Votes	%
Whig	Henry Tufton	Unopposed	
Tory	James Maitland	Unopposed	
Registered electors		c. 99	
Whig hold			
Tory hold			

General election, 5 August 1830: Appleby
Party	Candidate	Votes	%
Whig	Henry Tufton	Unopposed	
Tory	James Maitland	Unopposed	
Whig hold			
Tory hold			

== Elections in the 18th century ==
Election results taken from the History of Parliament Trust series.

General election 1715: Appleby (2 seats)
Party	Candidate	Votes	%	±%
Non Partisan	Thomas Lutwyche	Unopposed	N/A	N/A
Non Partisan	Richard Sandford	Unopposed	N/A	N/A

General election 1722: Appleby (2 seats)
Party	Candidate	Votes	%	±%
Non Partisan	Sackville Tufton	Unopposed	N/A	N/A
Non Partisan	Richard Sandford	Unopposed	N/A	N/A

- Death of Sandford

By-election 2 May 1723: Appleby
Party	Candidate	Votes	%	±%
Non Partisan	James Lowther	99	53.80	N/A
Non Partisan	Trevor Hill	85	46.20	N/A

General election 1727: Appleby (2 seats)
Party	Candidate	Votes	%	±%
Non Partisan	Sackville Tufton	Unopposed	N/A	N/A
Non Partisan	John Ramsden	Unopposed	N/A	N/A

- Succession of Tufton as 7th Earl of Thanet

By-election 24 January 1730: Appleby
Party	Candidate	Votes	%	±%
Non Partisan	Walter Plumer	Unopposed	N/A	N/A

General election 1734: Appleby (2 seats)
Party	Candidate	Votes	%	±%
Non Partisan	Walter Plumer	Unopposed	N/A	N/A
Non Partisan	John Ramsden	Unopposed	N/A	N/A

General election 1741: Appleby (2 seats)
Party	Candidate	Votes	%	±%
Non Partisan	George Dodington	Unopposed	N/A	N/A
Non Partisan	John Ramsden	Unopposed	N/A	N/A

- Dodington chose to sit for Bridgwater

By-election 1 January 1742: Appleby
Party	Candidate	Votes	%	±%
Non Partisan	Charles Wyndham	Unopposed	N/A	N/A

General election 1747: Appleby (2 seats)
Party	Candidate	Votes	%	±%
Non Partisan	Randle Wilbraham	Unopposed	N/A	N/A
Non Partisan	John Ramsden	Unopposed	N/A	N/A

Parliament of the United Kingdom
Vacant since 1782 Title last held by Banbury	Constituency represented by the prime minister 1783–1784	Succeeded by Cambridge University
