= Sir Samuel Fludyer, 1st Baronet =

English merchant and banker, Member of Parliament and Lord Mayor of London

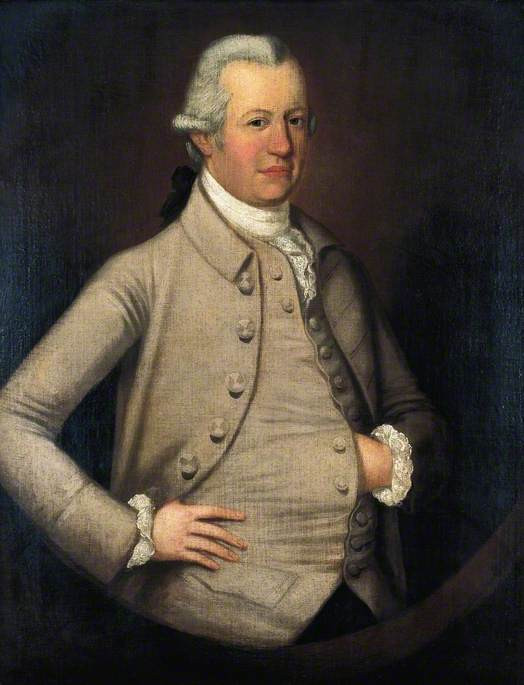
Sir Samuel Fludyer, 1st Baronet

Arms of Fludyer: Sable, a cross patoncée between four escallops argent each charged with a cross patoncée of the field

Sir Samuel Fludyer, 1st Baronet (c. 1704 – 18 January 1768), of Lee Place in Kent, was an English merchant and banker who served as a Member of Parliament and Lord Mayor of London.

== Biography ==
Fludyer was the eldest son of Samuel Fludyer, a London clothier but originally from Frome in Somerset, and was educated at Westminster School. He was by upbringing a religious dissenter, though in later years he moved towards the established church. Joining his father's business, he expanded it greatly until he was one of the city's foremost merchants; by the time of his death his fortune was said to amount to £900,000 (equivalent to £150,885,000 in 2023). (His younger brother, Sir Thomas, was his junior partner in the company and was knighted at a City of London reception for the King while Sir Samuel was Lord Mayor.)

Becoming a member of the Clothworkers' Company, he was elected to Common Council in 1734, became an alderman in 1751, was sheriff in 1754–1755 and Lord Mayor in 1761–1762. In 1753 he also became a director of the Bank of England, serving four terms, and was its Deputy Governor from 1766 until his death in 1768. In September 1755, in his capacity as sheriff, he presented an address from the Lord Mayor, aldermen and common council to George II expressing satisfaction at the King's safe return from his German dominions, and the King marked the occasion by knighting him. Four years later, on 14 November 1759, he was raised to the dignity of a baronetcy. The elaborate wig that he wore on becoming Lord Mayor in 1761 was depicted in William Hogarth's 1761 engraving Five Orders of Periwigs, although George II had a snobbish dislike of merchants becoming peers so like other merchants he could not expect to be a peer.

In 1754, Fludyer entered Parliament, having spent £1,500 to secure a seat at Chippenham in Wiltshire; Chippenham was a textile town, and Fludyer cemented his influence by agreeing to buy all its manufactured cloth at premium prices, which played an important part in establishing the town's prosperity. In the House of Commons he was generally considered a supporter of the Whig government, though not an absolutely reliable one; he is not recorded as having ever spoken during his 14 years in the House. At the general election of 1761 he stood as parliamentary candidate for the City of London, but despite having been one of the four victors on an informal show of hands was defeated at the poll; however, as he had taken the precaution of also being returned once more for Chippenham, he remained an MP.

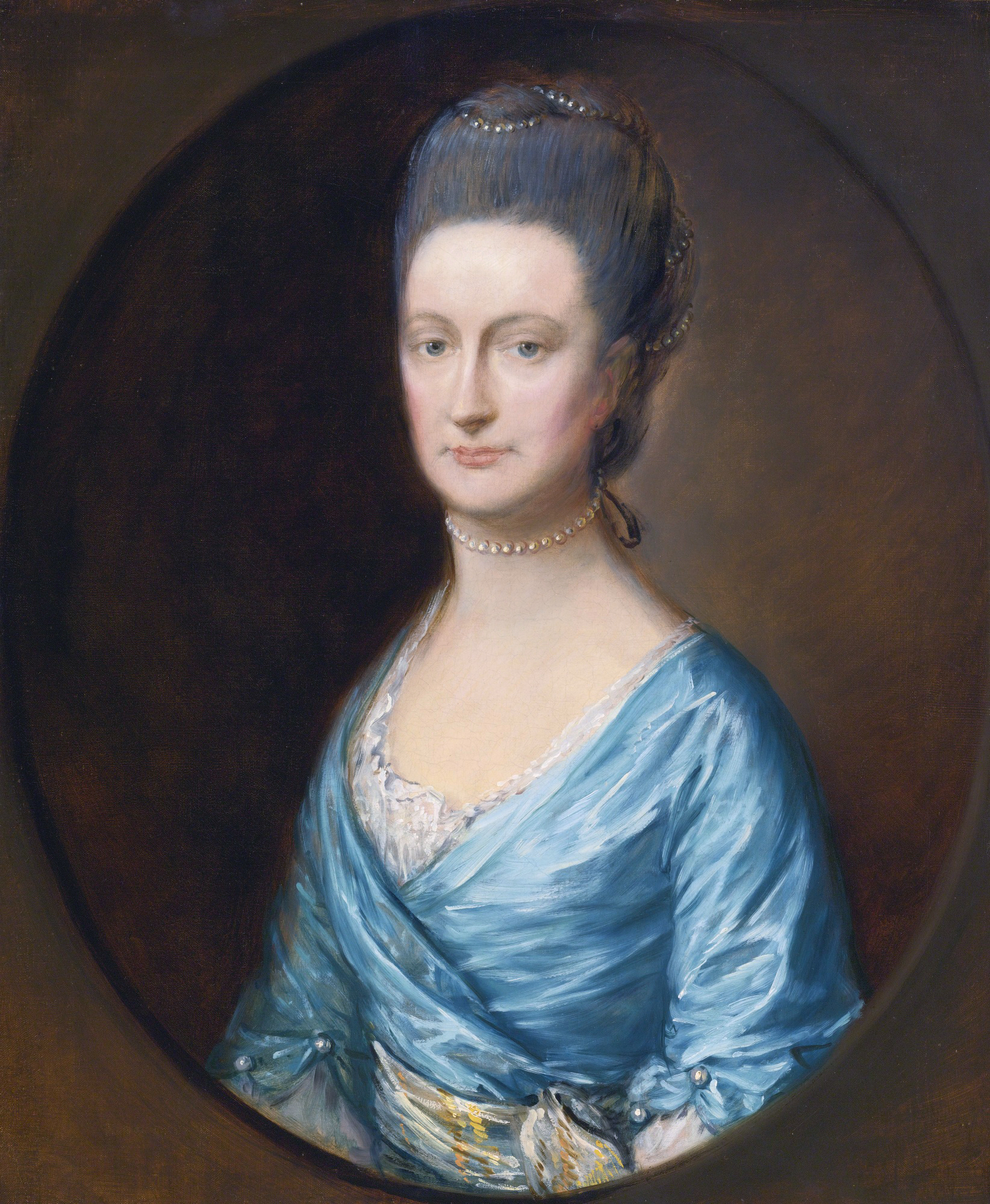
Caroline, Lady Fludyer, by Thomas Gainsborough, (c. 1772)

In his second Parliament, he seems to have actively sought government contracts for his business, which being an MP (with a vote valuable to the government) he was well placed to secure, and in 1763 took over (in partnership with Adam Drummond) as contractor to the Treasury as Paymaster to the British forces in the North American colonies. When the Marquess of Rockingham's government replaced George Grenville's he was on the list of those whose contracts it was initially intended to cancel, but notice to terminate was not given to him until July 1766; days later Rockingham had resigned and Fludyer, by supporting the new Chatham administration, saw his contract reinstated the following year.

He married twice: to Jane Clerke (d. 1757), by whom he had one daughter; and to Caroline Brudenell (d. 1803), niece of the 3rd Earl of Cardigan, whom he married on 2 September 1758. They had two sons:

- Samuel Brudenell Fludyer (1759–1833), who succeeded to the baronetcy, and was MP for Aldborough
- George Fludyer (1761–1837), MP for Chippenham and Appleby

Fludyer died in 1768 and was buried in the churchyard of St Margaret's, Lee. The tomb to both Sir Charles and his brother is a Grade II-listed monument.

== See also ==
- Fludyer baronets

Parliament of Great Britain
| Preceded by Sir Edmond Thomas; Sir Edward Bayntun-Rolt | Member of Parliament for Chippenham; 1754–1768; With: Sir Edward Bayntun-Rolt | Succeeded by Sir Thomas Fludyer; Sir Edward Bayntun-Rolt |
Baronetage of Great Britain
| New creation | Baronet (of Lee Place); 1759–1768 | Succeeded by Samuel Brudenell Fludyer |
