= Robert Overdo (fl. 1368–1386) =

English politician

Robert Overdo (fl. 1368–1386), of Appleby-in-Westmorland, was an English politician.

He was a Member (MP) of the Parliament of England for Appleby in 1368, 1369, 1371, 1372, 1378, January 1380, February 1383, October 1383, April 1384 and 1386.
