= Sir Samuel Brudenell Fludyer, 2nd Baronet =

English politician

Arms of Fludyer: Sable, a cross patoncée between four escallops argent each charged with a cross patoncée of the field

Samuel Brudenell Fludyer (1759–1833) was an English politician. He inherited great wealth from his father, the first baronet, and social position from his mother Caroline Brudenell, the niece of the 3rd earl of Cardigan. He became a Member of Parliament, but there is no record of his having spoken in the house.

== Early life ==
Samuel Brudenell Fludyer was born 8 October 1759, the first son of Samuel Fludyer and his second wife. He was educated at Westminster School from 1771 and went on the Grand Tour. He inherited the baronetcy in his minority, 18 January 1768 and was returned to Parliament for Aldeburgh when a vacancy occurred in May 1781. When Parliament was dissolved in 1784 he was not re-elected.

He was commissioned as an ensign in the Monmouthshire Militia on 25 June 1781, and was promoted to captain in the combined Monmouth and Brecon Militia on 25 March 1799, rising to lieutenant-colonel on 1 July 1805. He resigned on 24 August 1812.

== Marriage and children ==
On 5 October 1786, Fludyer married his first cousin Maria, the daughter of Robert Weston and Louisa, daughter of James Brudenell. They had four children, Samuel Fludyer, 3rd Baronet and three daughters, Maria and Caroline-Louise, and Charlotte who died young.

== Death ==
On 17 February 1833 he died in Felixstowe, Suffolk. Apart from lending his name to the Fludyer Arms, a hotel in Felixstowe, he seems to have no lasting achievements.

Parliament of Great Britain
Preceded by Edward Onslow	Member of Parliament for Aldborough; 1781–1784	Succeeded by John Gally Knight
Baronetage of Great Britain
Preceded by Samuel Fludyer	Baronet (of Lee Place); 1768–1833	Succeeded by Samuel Fludyer
