= List of ceremonial counties in England by GVA =

This is a list of ceremonial counties in England by gross value added for the year 2021. Data is gathered by the Office for National Statistics (ONS) and is given in terms of Nomenclature of Territorial Units for Statistics (NUTS), statistical area codes used for the European Union, which loosely follow administrative units of the United Kingdom.

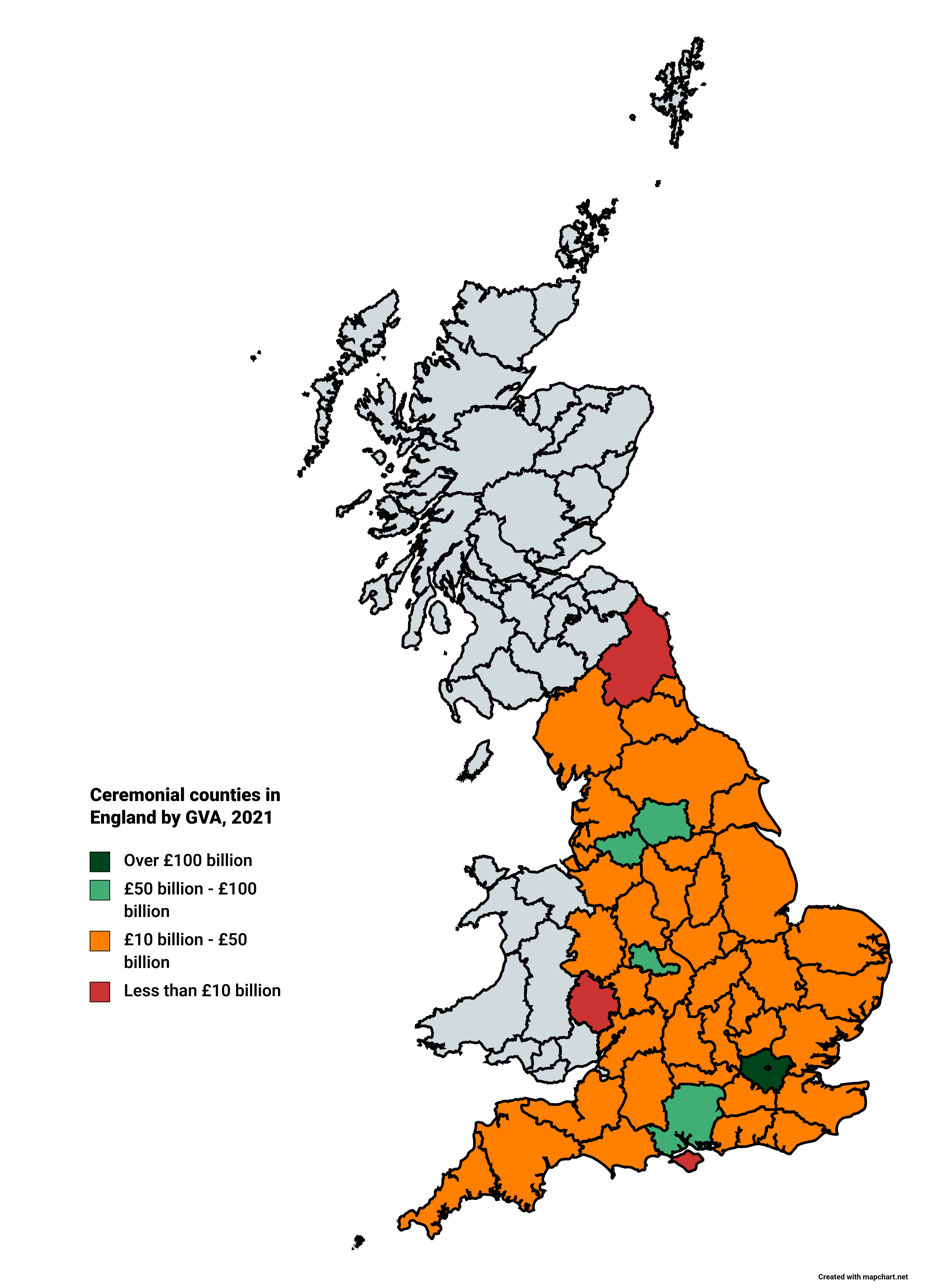
Ceremonial counties in England by GVA, 2021

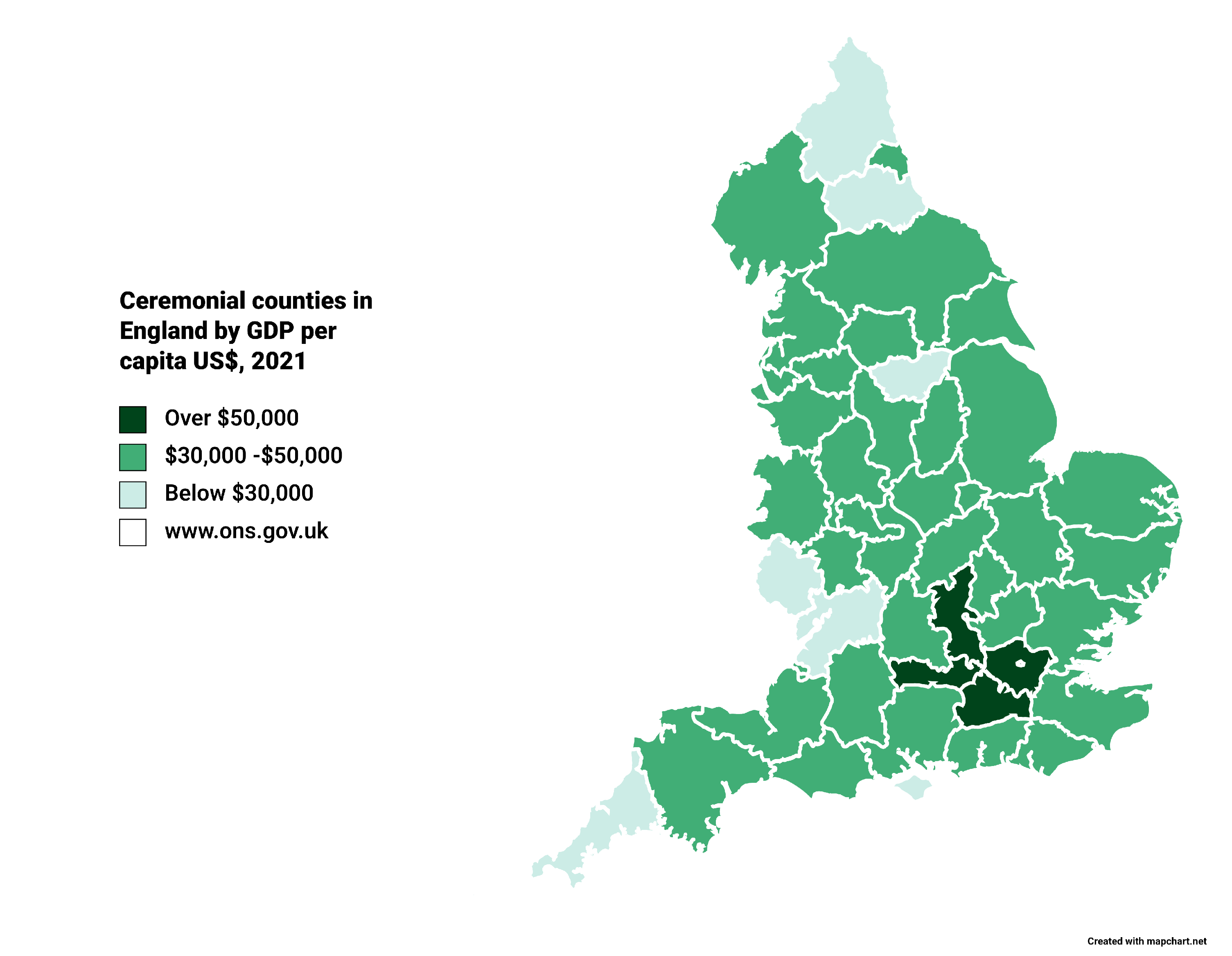
Ceremonial counties in England by GDP per capita, 2021

Gross value added (GVA) is a measure of the value of goods and services produced in a localized area without considering taxes and subsidies (unlike gross domestic product (GDP)). Additionally, the ONS's estimates on GVA adapt to regional disparities in commuting regions by allocating the GVA to the area in which an employee commuted from. They also use five-period moving averages to smooth data.

== Table ==
Rank	County	GVA	GVA (US$)	GVA per head	GVA per capita (US$)
1	Greater London (Note: GVA data includes the ceremonial county of the City of London.)	£487.437 billion	$670.567 billion	£54,762	$75,336
2	Greater Manchester	£78.744 billion	$108.328 billion	£27,884	$38,360
3	West Midlands	£70.961 billion	$97.621 billion	£24,385	$33,547
4	West Yorkshire	£60.137 billion	$82.730 billion	£25,988	$35,752
5	Hampshire	£57.838 billion	$79.568 billion	£31,230	$42,963
6	Surrey	£48.322 billion	$66.477 billion	£40,437	$55,629
7	Berkshire	£47.810 billion	$65.772 billion	£52,194	$71,804
8	Kent	£46.942 billion	$64.578 billion	£25,443	$35,002
9	Essex	£44.766 billion	$61.585 billion	£24,529	$33,745
10	Hertfordshire	£42.137 billion	$57.968 billion	£35,892	$49,376
11	Merseyside	£35.345 billion	$48.624 billion	£23,626	$32,503
12	Lancashire	£34.996 billion	$48.144 billion	£23,253	$31,989
13	Cheshire	£34.859 billion	$47.956 billion	£32,762	$45,071
14	Somerset (Note: GVA data includes the unitary authority area of South Gloucestershire (as South Gloucestershire is combined with North Somerset and Bath & North East Somerset in the data set).)	£34.254 billion	$47.123 billion	£26,893	$36,996
15	Buckinghamshire	£31.528 billion	$43.373 billion	£39,410	$54,216
16	South Yorkshire	£28.971 billion	$39.855 billion	£20,753	$28,550
17	Cambridgeshire	£28.648 billion	$39.411 billion	£33,863	$46,585
18	Leicestershire and Rutland (Note: GVA data is for two ceremonial counties: Leicestershire and Rutland. Rutland's population represents 4% of the total population.)	£28.123 billion	$38.689 billion	£25,566	$35,172
19	Nottinghamshire	£27.877 billion	$38.350 billion	£23,888	$32,862
20	Tyne and Wear	£27.303 billion	$37.561 billion	£24,205	$33,299
21	Devon	£26.367 billion	$36.273 billion	£22,232	$30,584
22	Staffordshire	£25.454 billion	$35.017 billion	£22,626	$31,126
23	Derbyshire	£25.413 billion	$34.961 billion	£23,975	$32,982
24	Lincolnshire	£25.107 billion	$34.540 billion	£23,269	$32,011
25	Oxfordshire	£24.208 billion	$33.303 billion	£34,832	$47,918
26	West Sussex	£23.296 billion	$32.048 billion	£26,994	$37,136
27	Wiltshire	£22.467 billion	$30.908 billion	£31,511	$43,349
28	North Yorkshire (Note: GVA data excludes all of the borough and unitary authority area of Stockton-on-Tees, which are listed under Durham instead. Parts of Stockton-on-Tees fall south of the River Tees and thus inside North Yorkshire's borders.)	£22.103 billion	$30.407 billion	£22,857	$31,445
29	Norfolk	£20.669 billion	$28.434 billion	£23,120	$31,806
30	Northamptonshire	£20.608 billion	$28.350 billion	£27,811	$38,260
31	Suffolk	£19.620 billion	$26.991 billion	£22,169	$38,260
32	Warwickshire	£19.592 billion	$26.953 billion	£33,721	$46,390
33	East Sussex	£19.262 billion	$26.499 billion	£22,849	$31,434
34	Dorset	£19.137 billion	$26.327 billion	£25,048	$34,459
35	Gloucestershire	£19.123 billion	$26.308 billion	£20,401	$28,065
36	Durham (Note: GVA data includes all of the borough and unitary authority area of Stockton-on-Tees; some of which spills south of the River Tees and thus includes parts of the ceremonial county of North Yorkshire.)	£18.744 billion	$25.786 billion	£21,623	$29,747
37	Bristol	£16.773 billion	$23.075 billion	£35,687	$49,095
38	Bedfordshire	£15.525 billion	$21.358 billion	£23,775	$32,707
39	Worcestershire	£14.279 billion	$19.644 billion	£24,202	$33,294
40	East Riding of Yorkshire	£13.425 billion	$18.469 billion	£22,601	$31,092
41	Cumbria	£12.803 billion	$17.613 billion	£25,555	$35,156
42	Cornwall	£11.661 billion	$16.042 billion	£20,676	$28,443
43	Shropshire	£11.629 billion	$15.998 billion	£23,636	$32,516
44	Northumberland	£5.512 billion	$7.583 billion	£17,554	$24,149
45	Herefordshire	£4.141 billion	$5.697 billion	£20,399	$28,063
46	Isle of Wight	£2.589 billion	$3.562 billion	£19,915	$27,398

== See also ==
- List of ceremonial counties in England by GDP
- List of regions of the United Kingdom by GRDP

== Sources ==
- "Regional Gross Value Added (Income Approach) (1997-2014)". Office for National Statistics.
