= Counties in England by population =

This is a list of counties in England by population. England's counties are variously defined. Ceremonial counties were formed from local government counties in 1997 and are used for lieutenancy and shrievalty, whereas historic counties are based on the boundaries counties used before 1884. The list includes both types.

Rank	County	Ceremonial county population (2021-22)	Historic county population (2011)	Local government counties (2024) (Note: Based on non-metropolitan counties and unitary authorities which share the name of a ceremonial county)	Region
1	Greater London	8,901,000	N/A	N/A	London
2	West Midlands	2,910,000	N/A	3,036,605	West Midlands
3	Greater Manchester	2,824,000	N/A	3,009,664	North West
4	West Yorkshire	2,314,000	N/A	2,435,236	Yorkshire and the Humber
5	Hampshire	1,852,000	2,099,640	1,447,214	South East
6	Kent	1,845,000	2,747,715	1,639,029	South East
7	Essex	1,825,000	2,999,248	1,563,365	East of England
8	Lancashire	1,505,000	4,942,364	1,294,914	North West
9	Merseyside	1,496,000	N/A	1,475,541	North West
10	South Yorkshire	1,396,000	N/A	1,430,623	Yorkshire and the Humber
11	Surrey	1,195,000	2,975,836	1,248,649	South East
12	Devon	1,186,000	1,133,463	842,313	South West
13	Hertfordshire	1,174,000	1,157,166	1,236,191	East of England
14	Nottinghamshire	1,167,000	1,096,617	857,013	East Midlands
15	North Yorkshire	1,164,000	N/A	635,270	Yorkshire and the Humber North East
16	Tyne and Wear	1,128,000	N/A	1,178,389	North East
17	Staffordshire	1,125,000	2,159,392	907,153	West Midlands
18	Lincolnshire	1,079,000	1,038,510	789,502	East Midlands Yorkshire and the Humber
19	Cheshire	1,064,000	1,668,894	N/A	North West
20	Derbyshire	1,060,000	1,148,373	822,377	East Midlands
21	Leicestershire	1,058,000	975,403	745,573	East Midlands
22	Somerset	983,000	1,053,504	588,328	South West
23	Berkshire	916,000	842,804	N/A	South East
24	Gloucestershire	907,000	1,147,106	669,380	South West
25	Norfolk	894,000	807,721	940,359	East of England
26	County Durham	860,000	1,467,037	538,011	North East
27	West Sussex	863,000	N/A	915,037	South East
28	Cambridgeshire	846,000	460,448	710,317	East of England
29	East Sussex	843,000	N/A	560,882	South East
30	Buckinghamshire	800,000	916,903	578,772	South East
31	Suffolk	767,000	775,099	786,231	East of England
32	Dorset	764,000	543,296	389,947	South West
33	Northamptonshire	741,000	838,786	N/A	East Midlands
34	Wiltshire	713,000	682,380	523,700	South West
35	Oxfordshire	695,000	512,345	763,218	South East
36	Bedfordshire	653,000	602,847	N/A	East of England
37	East Riding of Yorkshire	594,000	N/A	355,884	Yorkshire and the Humber
38	Worcestershire	590,000	1,125,037	621,360	West Midlands
39	Warwickshire	581,000	1,632,885	632,207	West Midlands
40	Cornwall	564,000	533,594	583,289	South West
41	Cumbria	501,000	N/A	N/A	North West
42	Shropshire	492,000	472,027	332,455	West Midlands
43	Bristol	470,000	N/A	494,399	South West
44	Northumberland	314,000	797,006	331,420	North East
45	Herefordshire	187,557	183,631	191,047	West Midlands
46	Isle of Wight	140,889	N/A	141,660	South East
47	Rutland	42,000	37,677	41,443	East Midlands
-	Yorkshire	Historic county	5,218,838	N/A	
-	Cumberland	Historic county	306,241	280,495	
-	Westmorland	Historic county	87,466	N/A	
-	Middlesex	Historic county	4,000,927	N/A	
-	Huntingdonshire	Historic county	211,776	190,619	
-	Sussex	Historic county	1,612,454	N/A	
