= List of ceremonial counties in England by GDP =

This is a list of ceremonial counties in England by gross domestic product for the year 2022. Data is gathered by the Office for National Statistics (ONS) and is given on the basis of International Territorial Level, which is the geocode standard used by the United Kingdom for statistical purposes.

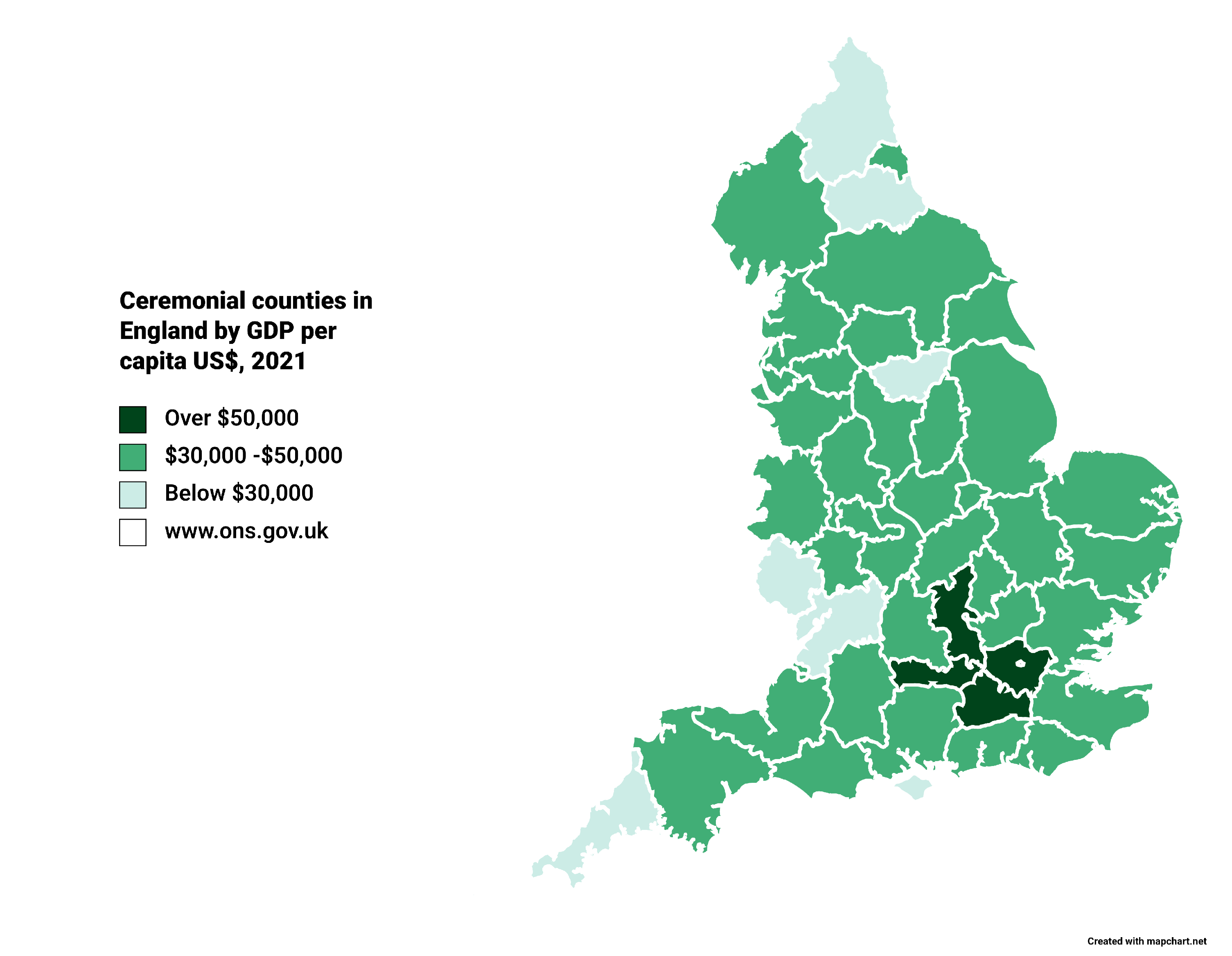
Ceremonial counties in England by GDP per capita, 2021

The figures in the main table are first provided in the original currency (GBP) of the source, followed by the figures in USD for international comparison. The USD figures are compiled using the average GBP to USD exchange rate for the year 2022.

== Main table ==
Ceremonial counties by GDP in 2022
| Rank | County | Population (2024) | GDP (2022) (£ million) | GDP per capita (£) | GDP (2022) (USD million) | GDP per capita (USD) |
|---|---|---|---|---|---|---|
| 1 | London (Note: Includes both ceremonial counties of Greater London and the City of London due to them being combined in the data set.) | 8,855,333 | 562,179 | 63,407 | 695,050 | 78,376 |
| 2 | Greater Manchester | 2,911,744 | 99,714 | 34,246 | 123,224 | 42,331 |
| 3 | West Midlands | 2,939,927 | 85,192 | 30,117 | 105,325 | 37,227 |
| 4 | Hampshire | 1,877,917 | 74,961 | 39,917 | 92,685 | 49,341 |
| 5 | West Yorkshire | 2,345,235 | 74,405 | 31,287 | 91,996 | 38,673 |
| 6 | Somerset & Gloucestershire (Note: Somerset and Gloucestershire are separate ceremonial counties, however their data is inextricable (to separate entities) from the data set due to South Gloucestershire being lumped in with Bath and North East Somerset.) | 1,885,137 | 67,559 | 35,845 | 83,493 | 44,307 |
| 7 | Berkshire | 958,803 | 58,447 | 60,958 | 72,312 | 75,349 |
| 8 | Kent | 1,875,893 | 58,012 | 30,925 | 71,783 | 38,226 |
| 9 | Essex | 1,877,301 | 57,931 | 30,859 | 71,682 | 38,144 |
| 10 | Surrey | 1,204,588 | 56,625 | 47,008 | 70,006 | 58,106 |
| 11 | Hertfordshire | 1,204,588 | 51,501 | 42,754 | 63,678 | 52,847 |
| 12 | Merseyside | 1,442,081 | 45,413 | 28,906 | 56,110 | 35,730 |
| 13 | Lancashire | 1,550,490 | 45,148 | 29,119 | 55,783 | 35,993 |
| 14 | Cheshire | 1,108,765 | 41,837 | 42,699 | 51,721 | 52,779 |
| 15 | South Yorkshire | 1,415,054 | 36,869 | 26,485 | 45,576 | 32,738 |
| 16 | Buckinghamshire | 852,589 | 36,573 | 42,896 | 45,198 | 53,023 |
| 17 | Devon | 1,232,660 | 36,120 | 29,302 | 44,665 | 36,220 |
| 18 | Leicestershire and Rutland (Note: Leicestershire and Rutland are separate ceremonial counties, however their data is combined in the data set due to Rutland's small size (its population makes up only 4 % of the combined total).) | 1,136,705 | 35,369 | 31,108 | 43,722 | 38,452 |
| 19 | North Yorkshire | 1,172,860 | 35,180 | 34,848 | 43,485 | 43,075 |
| 20 | Cambridgeshire | 906,814 | 34,460 | 38,001 | 42,589 | 46,972 |
| 21 | Tyne and Wear | 1,146,624 | 34,332 | 29,942 | 42,424 | 37,011 |
| 22 | Nottinghamshire | 1,163,335 | 33,710 | 28,977 | 41,653 | 35,818 |
| 23 | Staffordshire | 1,139,794 | 33,616 | 29,493 | 41,533 | 36,456 |
| 24 | Lincolnshire | 1,103,320 | 33,071 | 29,974 | 40,900 | 37,050 |
| 25 | Oxfordshire | 738,276 | 31,072 | 42,088 | 38,418 | 52,024 |
| 26 | Derbyshire | 1,066,954 | 30,777 | 28,852 | 38,047 | 35,663 |
| 27 | West Sussex | 885,055 | 30,273 | 34,197 | 37,427 | 42,270 |
| 28 | Wiltshire | 747,124 | 28,817 | 38,552 | 35,604 | 47,653 |
| 29 | Northamptonshire | 792,421 | 25,705 | 32,445 | 31,770 | 40,105 |
| 30 | Norfolk | 925,299 | 25,583 | 27,649 | 31,613 | 34,176 |
| 31 | East Sussex | 828,685 | 24,867 | 30,008 | 30,733 | 37,092 |
| 32 | Dorset | 785,172 | 24,585 | 31,312 | 30,394 | 38,704 |
| 33 | Durham | 872,075 | 23,758 | 27,243 | 29,355 | 33,675 |
| 34 | Suffolk | 763,375 | 23,602 | 30,709 | 29,142 | 37,959 |
| 35 | Warwickshire | 599,153 | 23,511 | 38,694 | 29,029 | 47,829 |
| 36 | Bristol | 479,024 | 21,098 | 44,043 | 26,064 | 54,441 |
| 37 | Bedfordshire | 715,940 | 20,752 | 28,989 | 25,652 | 35,833 |
| 38 | Worcestershire | 604,947 | 18,083 | 29,683 | 22,351 | 36,691 |
| 39 | East Riding of Yorkshire | 615,161 | 18,024 | 29,294 | 22,278 | 36,210 |
| 40 | Cornwall | 577,694 | 15,853 | 27,441 | 19,600 | 33,919 |
| 41 | Shropshire | 516,049 | 15,804 | 30,612 | 19,542 | 37,839 |
| 42 | Cumbria | 503,033 | 15,087 | 29,992 | 18,642 | 37,073 |
| 43 | Northumberland | 324,362 | 7,349 | 22,656 | 9,090 | 28,005 |
| 44 | Herefordshire | 188,719 | 5,148 | 27,278 | 6,365 | 33,718 |
| 45 | Isle of Wight | 140,794 | 3,622 | 25,727 | 4,477 | 31,801 |

== Historical GDP ==
The GDP figures are in millions of GBP.

=== 1998 to 2000 ===
GDP by Ceremonial County (1998–2000)
| Rank | Ceremonial County | 1998 | 1999 | 2000 |
|---|---|---|---|---|
| 1 | Greater London | 195741 | 206677 | 222815 |
| 2 | Greater Manchester | 37444 | 39376 | 40498 |
| 3 | West Midlands | 38959 | 40117 | 41216 |
| 4 | Hampshire | 29550 | 30237 | 31887 |
| 5 | West Yorkshire | 31019 | 32806 | 33621 |
| 6 | Somerset & Gloucestershire | 27151 | 28532 | 29981 |
| 7 | Berkshire | 22129 | 23751 | 25170 |
| 8 | Kent | 30383 | 31865 | 33227 |
| 9 | Essex | 31014 | 32240 | 33510 |
| 10 | Surrey | 24756 | 26406 | 27843 |
| 11 | Hertfordshire | 32140 | 33560 | 34312 |
| 12 | Merseyside | 37111 | 38573 | 39007 |
| 13 | Lancashire | 33201 | 34209 | 35090 |
| 14 | Cheshire | 16104 | 16938 | 17376 |
| 15 | South Yorkshire | 31463 | 32728 | 33450 |
| 16 | Buckinghamshire | 14730 | 15425 | 16279 |
| 17 | Devon | 14203 | 14951 | 15351 |
| 18 | Leicestershire and Rutland | 14057 | 14443 | 15241 |
| 19 | North Yorkshire | 14972 | 15469 | 16129 |
| 20 | Cambridgeshire | 13177 | 13827 | 14382 |
| 21 | Tyne and Wear | 15208 | 15258 | 15746 |
| 22 | Nottinghamshire | 14555 | 15154 | 15409 |
| 23 | Staffordshire | 14564 | 14815 | 15168 |
| 24 | Lincolnshire | 12940 | 13154 | 13774 |
| 25 | Oxfordshire | 11979 | 12493 | 13109 |
| 26 | Derbyshire | 13744 | 14286 | 14573 |
| 27 | West Sussex | 12951 | 13846 | 14372 |
| 28 | Wiltshire | 10782 | 11330 | 11829 |
| 29 | Northamptonshire | 10063 | 10333 | 10951 |
| 30 | Norfolk | 10165 | 10598 | 11271 |
| 31 | East Sussex | 9242 | 9801 | 10266 |
| 32 | Dorset | 10086 | 10734 | 11345 |
| 33 | Durham | 10796 | 11311 | 11727 |
| 34 | Suffolk | 10273 | 10773 | 11368 |
| 35 | Warwickshire | 8859 | 9525 | 9930 |
| 36 | Bristol | 6909 | 7236 | 7642 |
| 37 | Bedfordshire | 8697 | 9096 | 9705 |
| 38 | Worcestershire | 7762 | 8146 | 8529 |
| 39 | East Yorkshire | 7580 | 7696 | 8084 |
| 40 | Cornwall | 5582 | 5785 | 6119 |
| 41 | Shropshire | 6367 | 6550 | 6713 |
| 42 | Cumbria | 7434 | 7712 | 7693 |
| 43 | Northumberland | 3473 | 3505 | 3573 |
| 44 | Herefordshire | 2400 | 2530 | 2659 |
| 45 | Isle of Wight | 1373 | 1432 | 1502 |

=== 2000 to 2010 ===
GDP by Ceremonial County (1998–2022)
| Rank | Ceremonial County | 2000 | 2001 | 2002 | 2003 | 2004 | 2005 | 2006 | 2007 | 2008 | 2009 | 2010 |
|---|---|---|---|---|---|---|---|---|---|---|---|---|
| 1 | Greater London | 222815 | 229343 | 237805 | 251438 | 264024 | 284255 | 301650 | 327381 | 334602 | 327455 | 343600 |
| 2 | Greater Manchester | 40498 | 42720 | 44720 | 46758 | 49444 | 52402 | 55032 | 57757 | 58568 | 58404 | 59881 |
| 3 | West Midlands | 41216 | 43014 | 44324 | 46368 | 48640 | 50889 | 52236 | 54524 | 55405 | 53643 | 56062 |
| 4 | Hampshire | 31887 | 33594 | 35211 | 36531 | 38631 | 40584 | 41863 | 44168 | 46055 | 45536 | 47759 |
| 5 | West Yorkshire | 33621 | 34842 | 36201 | 38675 | 41004 | 43525 | 45655 | 47921 | 48117 | 47233 | 48254 |
| 6 | Somerset & Gloucestershire | 29981 | 31471 | 32744 | 34342 | 36059 | 37700 | 39154 | 40691 | 42183 | 41309 | 43191 |
| 7 | Berkshire | 25170 | 25713 | 26734 | 28573 | 29423 | 31145 | 32369 | 33981 | 35203 | 34809 | 35455 |
| 8 | Kent | 33227 | 33993 | 35645 | 37492 | 39001 | 41036 | 42529 | 44738 | 45572 | 43947 | 45836 |
| 9 | Essex | 33510 | 34582 | 35520 | 36730 | 38129 | 39790 | 41134 | 42395 | 43332 | 42171 | 43093 |
| 10 | Surrey | 27843 | 28831 | 29643 | 30603 | 31735 | 33252 | 35913 | 37317 | 38727 | 38290 | 39661 |
| 11 | Hertfordshire | 34312 | 35503 | 36789 | 38211 | 39700 | 40885 | 42105 | 43790 | 44567 | 43758 | 45001 |
| 12 | Merseyside | 39007 | 39510 | 40023 | 41280 | 42405 | 43690 | 44502 | 45302 | 45891 | 44802 | 45980 |
| 13 | Lancashire | 35090 | 35811 | 36527 | 37001 | 37890 | 39003 | 40111 | 41020 | 41880 | 40523 | 41567 |
| 14 | Cheshire | 17376 | 19388 | 19995 | 20390 | 21725 | 22922 | 24411 | 25533 | 25506 | 25162 | 26299 |
| 15 | South Yorkshire | 33450 | 34068 | 35118 | 36550 | 37816 | 39226 | 40566 | 42291 | 42768 | 41468 | 42553 |
| 16 | Buckinghamshire | 16279 | 17051 | 17845 | 18952 | 19149 | 20162 | 20986 | 22041 | 22955 | 22244 | 22937 |
| 17 | Devon | 15351 | 16016 | 16826 | 17802 | 19329 | 20109 | 21223 | 21606 | 22308 | 21692 | 22698 |
| 18 | Leicestershire and Rutland | 15241 | 15735 | 16328 | 17425 | 18452 | 19239 | 20563 | 21604 | 22547 | 21899 | 23022 |
| 19 | North Yorkshire | 16129 | 16799 | 18049 | 19156 | 20204 | 20967 | 21778 | 22846 | 23303 | 22639 | 23033 |
| 20 | Cambridgeshire | 14382 | 15163 | 15862 | 16589 | 17364 | 18562 | 20032 | 20766 | 21254 | 20730 | 21563 |
| 21 | Tyne and Wear | 15746 | 16757 | 18005 | 18872 | 20598 | 21729 | 22766 | 23154 | 23489 | 22996 | 23720 |
| 22 | Nottinghamshire | 15409 | 16022 | 16760 | 17508 | 18674 | 19669 | 20684 | 21462 | 21994 | 21496 | 22404 |
| 23 | Staffordshire | 15168 | 15663 | 16516 | 17412 | 18443 | 19216 | 19876 | 20441 | 21359 | 20270 | 21248 |
| 24 | Lincolnshire | 13774 | 14623 | 15318 | 16356 | 16624 | 17362 | 18189 | 19400 | 20375 | 19440 | 20112 |
| 25 | Oxfordshire | 13109 | 13490 | 14325 | 15080 | 15322 | 16035 | 16554 | 17353 | 18374 | 17886 | 18620 |
| 26 | Derbyshire | 14573 | 15128 | 15791 | 16380 | 17342 | 18602 | 19030 | 19544 | 20104 | 19190 | 20148 |
| 27 | West Sussex | 14372 | 14675 | 15433 | 16067 | 16261 | 16677 | 17574 | 18352 | 19512 | 18768 | 19656 |
| 28 | Wiltshire | 11829 | 12795 | 13373 | 14129 | 14810 | 15466 | 16213 | 17403 | 18259 | 17976 | 18687 |
| 29 | Northamptonshire | 10951 | 11254 | 11533 | 12139 | 12736 | 13317 | 14257 | 15063 | 15575 | 14946 | 15768 |
| 30 | Norfolk | 11271 | 11767 | 12358 | 13044 | 13488 | 14191 | 15180 | 15685 | 16306 | 16324 | 16705 |
| 31 | East Sussex | 10266 | 10835 | 11293 | 11739 | 12109 | 12776 | 13495 | 13955 | 14745 | 14410 | 14753 |
| 32 | Dorset | 11345 | 11558 | 11879 | 12487 | 13084 | 13903 | 14527 | 15013 | 15840 | 15360 | 15770 |
| 33 | Durham | 11727 | 12068 | 12722 | 13559 | 14535 | 15005 | 15869 | 16481 | 16974 | 16922 | 17193 |
| 34 | Suffolk | 11368 | 11827 | 12354 | 12955 | 13494 | 14294 | 15240 | 15629 | 15965 | 15520 | 15901 |
| 35 | Warwickshire | 9930 | 10080 | 10422 | 11046 | 11538 | 12167 | 12863 | 13145 | 13629 | 12975 | 13644 |
| 36 | Bristol | 7642 | 8246 | 8599 | 9008 | 9581 | 9885 | 10359 | 11180 | 11692 | 11889 | 12489 |
| 37 | Bedfordshire | 9705 | 10132 | 10518 | 11017 | 11256 | 11867 | 12180 | 12719 | 13280 | 12565 | 12849 |
| 38 | Worcestershire | 8529 | 8708 | 8901 | 9442 | 10003 | 10305 | 10985 | 11005 | 11479 | 11259 | 11682 |
| 39 | East Yorkshire | 8084 | 8470 | 9090 | 9716 | 10231 | 10656 | 11411 | 11754 | 12352 | 11995 | 11695 |
| 40 | Cornwall | 6119 | 6433 | 6936 | 7517 | 7814 | 8311 | 8875 | 9088 | 9524 | 9033 | 9313 |
| 41 | Shropshire | 6713 | 7024 | 7356 | 7729 | 8115 | 8449 | 8742 | 8974 | 9397 | 8993 | 9296 |
| 42 | Cumbria | 7693 | 7754 | 8212 | 8778 | 9054 | 9511 | 10190 | 10497 | 11180 | 10853 | 11173 |
| 43 | Northumberland | 3573 | 3714 | 3986 | 4134 | 4422 | 4591 | 4818 | 4945 | 5076 | 4926 | 5111 |
| 44 | Herefordshire | 2659 | 2694 | 2827 | 2912 | 2902 | 2988 | 3100 | 3188 | 3357 | 3216 | 3282 |
| 45 | Isle of Wight | 1502 | 1560 | 1674 | 1757 | 1867 | 1933 | 2039 | 2094 | 2200 | 2112 | 2193 |

=== 2010 to 2022 ===
GDP by Ceremonial County (1998–2022)
| Rank | Ceremonial County | 2010 | 2011 | 2012 | 2013 | 2014 | 2015 | 2016 | 2017 | 2018 | 2019 | 2020 | 2021 | 2022 |
|---|---|---|---|---|---|---|---|---|---|---|---|---|---|---|
| 1 | Greater London | 343600 | 359273 | 373114 | 392876 | 419572 | 434589 | 460923 | 477262 | 494959 | 511331 | 470080 | 508056 | 562179 |
| 2 | Greater Manchester | 59881 | 60831 | 63504 | 66145 | 68109 | 70889 | 73347 | 78049 | 81081 | 84377 | 83399 | 89954 | 99714 |
| 3 | West Midlands | 56062 | 57794 | 59409 | 61727 | 64820 | 67167 | 71583 | 73880 | 76275 | 77707 | 72160 | 78210 | 85192 |
| 4 | Hampshire | 47759 | 49661 | 51273 | 53227 | 54924 | 56707 | 58492 | 61474 | 63104 | 67077 | 63765 | 67802 | 74960 |
| 5 | West Yorkshire | 48254 | 49867 | 51152 | 52593 | 54355 | 56954 | 58135 | 60811 | 63610 | 65178 | 61919 | 68155 | 74405 |
| 6 | Somerset & Gloucestershire | 43191 | 44168 | 45628 | 46742 | 49686 | 50207 | 51794 | 54432 | 56441 | 59076 | 56388 | 61750 | 67559 |
| 7 | Berkshire | 35455 | 37201 | 38780 | 39620 | 41186 | 42443 | 43641 | 44923 | 47514 | 49930 | 50226 | 53157 | 58447 |
| 8 | Kent | 45836 | 47983 | 48745 | 49532 | 50827 | 51844 | 53269 | 54934 | 56385 | 59045 | 57006 | 61573 | 64445 |
| 9 | Essex | 43093 | 43900 | 44733 | 46113 | 47406 | 48617 | 50028 | 51555 | 52692 | 54633 | 52129 | 55281 | 56570 |
| 10 | Surrey | 39661 | 40122 | 41713 | 43785 | 45697 | 46635 | 47069 | 48457 | 48986 | 51440 | 50187 | 52300 | 56625 |
| 11 | Hertfordshire | 45001 | 46300 | 47112 | 49000 | 50533 | 52004 | 53271 | 54512 | 55981 | 57001 | 54031 | 57017 | 51501 |
| 12 | Merseyside | 45980 | 46520 | 47201 | 48040 | 48945 | 49412 | 50201 | 50940 | 51512 | 52420 | 50018 | 52500 | 45413 |
| 13 | Lancashire | 41567 | 42502 | 43205 | 44009 | 44712 | 45029 | 46034 | 47001 | 47812 | 49001 | 47000 | 48512 | 45148 |
| 14 | Cheshire | 26299 | 27048 | 27983 | 29005 | 30679 | 31443 | 33522 | 34928 | 35635 | 37387 | 35623 | 37832 | 41837 |
| 15 | South Yorkshire | 42553 | 43638 | 44845 | 46166 | 46728 | 48736 | 50727 | 51753 | 53091 | 54516 | 50780 | 54057 | 58699 |
| 16 | Buckinghamshire | 22937 | 23954 | 24595 | 25665 | 27366 | 28873 | 29085 | 30384 | 31515 | 33154 | 32091 | 34153 | 36573 |
| 17 | Devon | 22698 | 23301 | 23967 | 24871 | 25785 | 26633 | 27336 | 28682 | 29258 | 30309 | 28017 | 32752 | 36120 |
| 18 | Leicestershire and Rutland | 23022 | 23099 | 23855 | 24890 | 26330 | 27272 | 28114 | 29014 | 30084 | 30736 | 28803 | 32216 | 35369 |
| 19 | North Yorkshire | 23033 | 24039 | 24478 | 25135 | 25808 | 26407 | 27434 | 28871 | 29504 | 30356 | 28611 | 32050 | 35180 |
| 20 | Cambridgeshire | 21563 | 22208 | 23158 | 23661 | 24689 | 25368 | 26582 | 28324 | 29152 | 30241 | 29925 | 32008 | 34460 |
| 21 | Tyne and Wear | 23720 | 24697 | 25577 | 26110 | 26924 | 27890 | 28528 | 29839 | 30157 | 31505 | 28430 | 31256 | 34332 |
| 22 | Nottinghamshire | 22404 | 23316 | 24197 | 24781 | 25776 | 26571 | 27346 | 28345 | 29408 | 30273 | 29434 | 31268 | 33710 |
| 23 | Staffordshire | 21248 | 22127 | 22441 | 23357 | 24035 | 24903 | 25510 | 26692 | 27557 | 28368 | 27009 | 31280 | 33616 |
| 24 | Lincolnshire | 20112 | 20370 | 20941 | 22002 | 22853 | 23704 | 24088 | 25641 | 26376 | 28138 | 26513 | 30298 | 33071 |
| 25 | Oxfordshire | 18620 | 19378 | 20130 | 21016 | 22195 | 22929 | 22911 | 23502 | 24586 | 26187 | 26846 | 28050 | 31072 |
| 26 | Derbyshire | 20148 | 20999 | 21848 | 22771 | 23190 | 23865 | 24686 | 25233 | 26474 | 27738 | 27687 | 29633 | 30777 |
| 27 | West Sussex | 19656 | 20148 | 20984 | 21508 | 22110 | 23255 | 24340 | 25693 | 26675 | 27577 | 25188 | 27081 | 30273 |
| 28 | Wiltshire | 18687 | 18964 | 19475 | 20074 | 21491 | 21984 | 22579 | 23163 | 24239 | 25110 | 23510 | 25450 | 28817 |
| 29 | Northamptonshire | 15768 | 15931 | 16349 | 17286 | 18127 | 18799 | 19544 | 20507 | 21620 | 22329 | 21227 | 23563 | 25705 |
| 30 | Norfolk | 16705 | 17133 | 17941 | 18695 | 19296 | 19629 | 20176 | 21229 | 21074 | 22829 | 21561 | 23434 | 25583 |
| 31 | East Sussex | 14753 | 15155 | 15644 | 16389 | 17193 | 17848 | 18845 | 19562 | 20103 | 21003 | 20379 | 22281 | 24867 |
| 32 | Dorset | 15770 | 16089 | 16440 | 17156 | 17869 | 18073 | 18832 | 20147 | 20751 | 21489 | 20350 | 22568 | 24585 |
| 33 | Durham | 17193 | 17401 | 17731 | 18101 | 18570 | 19258 | 19408 | 19677 | 20253 | 20969 | 20470 | 21926 | 23758 |
| 34 | Suffolk | 15901 | 16403 | 17038 | 17754 | 18410 | 18948 | 19762 | 20554 | 20900 | 22033 | 20637 | 22040 | 23602 |
| 35 | Warwickshire | 13644 | 14382 | 15322 | 16528 | 17544 | 18601 | 19170 | 21302 | 21814 | 22026 | 20632 | 21741 | 23511 |
| 36 | Bristol | 12489 | 12589 | 13151 | 13404 | 14078 | 14685 | 15616 | 16722 | 16666 | 17537 | 16797 | 19160 | 21098 |
| 37 | Bedfordshire | 12849 | 13105 | 13508 | 14500 | 15668 | 16407 | 17092 | 18256 | 18518 | 19081 | 16808 | 18412 | 20752 |
| 38 | Worcestershire | 11682 | 12372 | 13022 | 13583 | 14245 | 14452 | 14645 | 15657 | 16141 | 16603 | 16038 | 16742 | 18083 |
| 39 | East Yorkshire | 11695 | 11651 | 11897 | 12188 | 12578 | 13150 | 13527 | 14131 | 14822 | 15257 | 14073 | 16361 | 18024 |
| 40 | Cornwall | 9313 | 9696 | 10051 | 10442 | 10795 | 10978 | 11598 | 12450 | 12908 | 13352 | 12456 | 14387 | 15853 |
| 41 | Shropshire | 9296 | 9666 | 9901 | 10359 | 10699 | 10837 | 11452 | 11815 | 12271 | 12583 | 12283 | 14208 | 15804 |
| 42 | Cumbria | 11173 | 11178 | 11590 | 12015 | 12600 | 13038 | 13103 | 13449 | 13482 | 14162 | 12895 | 13937 | 15087 |
| 43 | Northumberland | 5111 | 5289 | 5356 | 5395 | 5564 | 5664 | 5845 | 6007 | 6119 | 6458 | 6011 | 6486 | 7349 |
| 44 | Herefordshire | 3282 | 3474 | 3589 | 3765 | 3966 | 4067 | 4136 | 4330 | 4525 | 4700 | 4421 | 4793 | 5148 |
| 45 | Isle of Wight | 2193 | 2301 | 2413 | 2574 | 2696 | 2763 | 2761 | 2898 | 2947 | 3151 | 3008 | 3250 | 3622 |

== See also ==
For an overview, including the figures on population, area and population density, see List of ceremonial counties of England. Other Wikipedia listing articles about the ceremonial counties of England:

- List of ceremonial counties in England by GVA
- List of ceremonial counties of England by highest point
