= Ceremonial counties of England =

Category of areas in England

Ceremonial counties of England and shrieval counties of England
- Location: England
- Number: 48
- Populations: 8,000 (City of London) to 8,167,000 (Greater London)
- Areas: 3km² to 8,611 km²
- Densities: 62/km² to 4,806/km²

Ceremonial counties, formally known as counties for the purposes of the lieutenancies, are areas of England to which lord-lieutenants are appointed. A lord-lieutenant is the monarch's representative in an area.

Shrieval counties have the same boundaries and serve a similar purpose, being the areas to which high sheriffs are appointed. High sheriffs are the monarch's judicial representative in an area.

The ceremonial counties are defined in the Lieutenancies Act 1997, and the shrieval counties in the Sheriffs Act 1887. Both are defined as groups of counties used for local government.

== History ==
The historic counties of England were originally used as areas for administering justice and organising the militia, overseen by a sheriff. From Tudor times onwards a lord-lieutenant was appointed to oversee the militia, taking some of the sheriff's functions.

Certain towns and cities were counties corporate, which gave them the right to appoint their own sheriffs and hold their own courts. Whilst in theory the counties corporate could have had separate lieutenants appointed for them, in practice all of them except London shared a lieutenant with the wider county from which they had been created. (Note: The county corporate of Bristol was created from parts of both Gloucestershire and Somerset, but was entirely included in the Gloucestershire lieutenancy, except for between 1660 and 1672 when it was included in the Somerset lieutenancy.) London had instead a commission of lieutenancy, headed by the Lord Mayor. The long-standing practice of appointing lieutenants jointly to the wider county and any counties corporate it contained was formalised by the Militia Act 1882.

Apart from the inclusion of the counties corporate, the counties for the purposes of lieutenancy generally corresponded to the judicial counties. The exception was Yorkshire, which was one judicial county, having a single Sheriff of Yorkshire, but from 1660 onwards each of Yorkshire's three ridings had its own lieutenant.

In 1889, elected county councils were established under the Local Government Act 1888, taking over the administrative functions of the quarter sessions. Certain towns and cities were made county boroughs, independent from the county councils. In counties where the quarter sessions had been held separately for different parts of the county, such as the Parts of Lincolnshire, each part was given its own county council. The area administered by a county council was called an administrative county. As such, some of the judicial or lieutenancy counties comprised several administrative counties and county boroughs.

The Ordnance Survey adopted the term 'geographical county' to describe the widest definition of the county. In most cases this was the lieutenancy county; the exceptions were Yorkshire, where the judicial county was larger on account of it being split into its three ridings for lieutenancy purposes, and the County of London where the administrative county was larger on account of the City of London and the rest of the county being separate for both judicial and lieutenancy purposes.

The counties lost their judicial functions in 1972, after which the main functions of the counties were the administrative functions of local government. Despite the loss of their functions, sheriffs continued to be appointed to the former judicial counties up until 1974.

In 1974, administrative counties and county boroughs were abolished, and a new system of metropolitan and non-metropolitan counties was introduced instead. Sheriffs were renamed 'high sheriffs' and both they and the lieutenants were appointed to the new versions of the counties.

The counties of Avon, Cleveland and Humberside, each of which had only been created in 1974, were all abolished in 1996. They were divided into unitary authorities; legally these are also non-metropolitan counties. As part of these reforms, it was decided to define counties for the purposes of lieutenancy differently from the local government counties in some cases, effectively reverting to the pre-1974 arrangements for lieutenancies. Whereas the lieutenancies had been defined slightly differently from the shrieval counties prior to 1974, it was decided in 1996 that the high sheriffs and lieutenants should be appointed to the same areas. Regulations amending the Sheriffs Act 1887 and specifying the areas for the appointment of lieutenants were accordingly brought in with effect from 1 April 1996.

The regulations were then consolidated into the Lieutenancies Act 1997. When Herefordshire, Rutland and Worcestershire were re-established as local government counties in 1997 and 1998 no amendment was made to the 1997 Act regarding them, allowing them to also serve as their own lieutenancy areas. The lieutenancy counties have not changed in area since 1998, although the definitions of which local government counties are included in each lieutenancy have been amended to reflect new unitary authorities being created since 1997.

In legislation the lieutenancy areas are described as 'counties for the purposes of the lieutenancies'; the informal term 'ceremonial county' has come into usage for such areas, appearing in parliamentary debates as early as 1996.

1851–1889

1889–1965

1974–1996

1998–present

== Shrieval counties ==
The shrieval counties are defined by the Sheriffs Act 1887 as amended, in a similar way to the lieutenancies defined by the Lieutenancies Act 1997. Each has a high sheriff appointed (except the City of London, which has two sheriffs).

== Definition ==
The Lieutenancies Act 1997 defines counties for the purposes of lieutenancies in terms of metropolitan and non-metropolitan counties (created by the Local Government Act 1972, as amended) as well as Greater London and the Isles of Scilly (which lie outside the 1972 Act's system). Although the term is not used in the act, these counties are sometimes known as "ceremonial counties". The counties are defined in Schedule 1, paragraphs 2–5 as amended (in 2009, 2019 and 2023).

Generally, each time a new non-metropolitan county is created, the 1997 Act is amended to redefine the existing areas of the lieutenancies in terms of the new areas. (Note: For example, Cheshire was prior to the 2009 structural changes to local government defined as the non-metropolitan counties of Cheshire, Halton & Warrington; the non-metropolitan county of Cheshire on 1 April that year split into the non-metropolitan counties of Cheshire East, Cheshire West and Chester, and Schedule 1 of the Lieutenancies Act 1997 was duly amended to take into account these changes to local government within the ceremonial county.) No such amendment was made in 1997 when Rutland was made a unitary authority or in 1998 when Herefordshire and Worcestershire were re-established; those three therefore have been given their own lieutenants again since the passing of the 1997 Act. The actual areas of the ceremonial counties have not changed since 1998.

=== Lieutenancy areas since 1998 ===
These are the 48 counties for the purposes of the lieutenancies in England, as currently defined:

Lieutenancy areas of England since 1998
Location	Land area		Population (2024)	Density		Composition (Note: Metropolitan and non-metropolitan counties, including unitary authority areas)
Location	(km^{2})	(mi^{2})	Population (2024)	(/km^{2})	(/mi^{2})	Composition
Bedfordshire	1,235	477	749,943	607	1,570	Bedford; Central Bedfordshire; Luton
Berkshire	1,262	487	992,327	786	2,040	Bracknell Forest; Reading; Slough; West Berkshire; Windsor and Maidenhead; Wokingham
Bristol	110	42	494,399	4,508	11,680	Bristol
Buckinghamshire	1,874	724	884,656	472	1,220	Buckinghamshire; Milton Keynes
Cambridgeshire	3,390	1,310	933,972	276	710	Cambridgeshire; Peterborough
Cheshire	2,346	906	1,139,884	486	1,260	Cheshire East; Cheshire West and Chester; Halton; Warrington
City of London (Note: Because the City of London has a Commission of Lieutenancy rather than a single lord-lieutenant, it is treated as a county for some purposes of the Lieutenancy Act. (Schedule 1 paragraph 4))	2.89	1.12	15,111	5,229	13,540	City of London
Cornwall	3,562	1,375	585,655	164	420	Cornwall; Isles of Scilly
Cumbria	6,768	2,613	510,680	75	190	Cumberland; Westmorland and Furness
Derbyshire	2,625	1,014	1,096,526	418	1,080	Derbyshire; Derby
Devon	6,707	2,590	1,254,506	187	480	Devon; Plymouth; Torbay
Dorset	2,653	1,024	798,914	301	780	Dorset; Bournemouth, Christchurch and Poole
(County Durham) Durham	2,676	1,033	894,025	334	870	County Durham; Darlington; Hartlepool; part of Stockton-on-Tees north of the River Tees
East Riding of Yorkshire	2,475	956	631,285	255	660	East Riding of Yorkshire; Kingston upon Hull
East Sussex	1,791	692	844,752	472	1,220	East Sussex; Brighton and Hove
Essex	3,664	1,415	1,929,610	527	1,360	Essex; Southend-on-Sea; Thurrock
Gloucestershire	3,149	1,216	975,712	310	800	Gloucestershire; South Gloucestershire
Greater London	1,569	606	9,074,625	5,783	14,980	None (see London boroughs)
Greater Manchester	1,276	493	3,009,664	2,359	6,110	Greater Manchester
Hampshire	3,769	1,455	1,920,959	510	1,300	Hampshire; Portsmouth; Southampton
Herefordshire	2,180	840	191,047	88	230	Herefordshire
Hertfordshire	1,643	634	1,236,191	752	1,950	Hertfordshire
Isle of Wight	380	150	141,660	373	970	Isle of Wight
Kent	3,738	1,443	1,931,684	517	1,340	Kent; Medway
Lancashire	3,066	1,184	1,601,645	522	1,350	Blackburn with Darwen; Blackpool; Lancashire
Leicestershire	2,156	832	1,133,921	526	1,360	Leicestershire; Leicester
Lincolnshire	6,976	2,693	1,120,749	161	420	Lincolnshire; North Lincolnshire; North East Lincolnshire
Merseyside	652	252	1,475,541	2,262	5,860	Merseyside
Norfolk	5,384	2,079	940,359	175	450	Norfolk
North Yorkshire	8,654	3,341	1,201,415	139	360	Middlesbrough; North Yorkshire; Redcar and Cleveland; York; part of Stockton-on-Tees south of the River Tees
Northamptonshire	2,364	913	813,682	344	890	North Northamptonshire; West Northamptonshire
Northumberland	5,020	1,940	331,420	66	170	Northumberland
Nottinghamshire	2,159	834	1,188,090	550	1,400	Nottinghamshire; Nottingham
Oxfordshire	2,605	1,006	763,218	293	760	Oxfordshire
Rutland	382	147	41,443	109	280	Rutland
Shropshire	3,488	1,347	528,407	152	390	Shropshire; Telford and Wrekin
Somerset	4,170	1,610	1,012,934	243	630	Bath and North East Somerset; North Somerset; Somerset
South Yorkshire	1,552	599	1,430,623	922	2,390	South Yorkshire
Staffordshire	2,714	1,048	1,177,578	434	1,120	Staffordshire; Stoke-on-Trent
Suffolk	3,800	1,500	786,231	207	540	Suffolk
Surrey	1,663	642	1,248,649	751	1,950	Surrey
Tyne and Wear	540	210	1,178,389	2,182	5,650	Tyne and Wear
Warwickshire	1,975	763	632,207	320	830	Warwickshire
West Midlands	902	348	3,036,605	3,368	8,720	West Midlands
West Sussex	1,991	769	915,037	460	1,200	West Sussex
West Yorkshire	2,029	783	2,435,236	1,200	3,100	West Yorkshire
Wiltshire	3,485	1,346	767,575	220	570	Swindon; Wiltshire
Worcestershire	1,741	672	621,360	357	920	Worcestershire

== Geographical counties 1889–1974 ==
Lieutenancy areas in 1890

After the creation of county councils in 1889, there were counties for judicial and shrieval purposes, counties for lieutenancy purposes, and administrative counties and county boroughs for the purposes of local government.

The 1888 Act used the term 'entire county' to refer to the group of administrative counties and county boroughs created within each judicial county. The Ordnance Survey used the term 'geographical county' to refer to this wider definition of the county.

Yorkshire had three lieutenancies, one for each riding, but was a single judicial county with one sheriff, and was counted as one geographical county by Ordnance Survey.

The counties lost their judicial functions in 1972 under the Courts Act 1971 which abolished the quarter sessions and assizes. Sheriffs continued to be appointed for each county despite the loss of the judicial functions. Certain towns and cities were counties corporate appointing their own sheriffs. The counties corporate were all included in a wider county for lieutenancy purposes, except the City of London which had its own lieutenants.

The geographical counties were relatively stable between 1889 and 1965. There were occasional boundary changes, notably following the Local Government Act 1894 which said that parishes and districts were no longer allowed to straddle county boundaries. After that most boundary changes were primarily to accommodate urban areas which were growing across county boundaries, such as when Caversham was transferred from Oxfordshire to Berkshire as a result of being absorbed into the County Borough of Reading in 1911.

The lieutenancies and judicial / shrieval counties were defined as groups of administrative counties and county boroughs, and so were automatically adjusted if the boundaries of those administrative areas changed. There were two exceptions to this rule (one only briefly). The county borough of Great Yarmouth straddled Norfolk and Suffolk for judicial and lieutenancy purposes until 1891 when it was placed entirely in Norfolk for those purposes. The county borough of Stockport straddled Cheshire and Lancashire for judicial and lieutenancy purposes – it was placed entirely in Lancashire for judicial purposes in 1956 but continued to straddle the two counties for lieutenancy purposes until 1974. (Note: The Third Schedule of the 1888 Act lists the county boroughs with the "Name of the County in which, for the purposes of this Act, the Borough is deemed to be situate." Four county boroughs were then listed as deemed to be in more than one county: Bristol, Great Yarmouth, Stockport and York. However, the purposes of the act did not include changing which counties, ridings and counties corporate were included in each lieutenancy area; those were already set by the Militia Act 1882 and were not altered by the 1888 Act, except that if the boundaries of an administrative county changed then so too did any lieutenancy, shrieval or judicial area to match (section 59). For lieutenancy purposes, Bristol was solely in Gloucestershire, and York was solely in the West Riding. As both were counties corporate they had their own sheriffs and served as their own judicial areas. The purposes of the 1888 Act which necessitated county boroughs to be deemed to be situated in a wider county related to certain financial matters rather than lieutenancy.)

Geographical, shrieval, lieutenancy and administrative counties 1889–1965
Geographical county	Sheriffs Counties corporate	Lieutenants	Administrative counties County boroughs
Bedfordshire	Bedfordshire	Bedfordshire	Bedfordshire – Luton (after 1964)
Berkshire	Berkshire	Berkshire	Berkshire – Reading
Buckinghamshire	Buckinghamshire	Buckinghamshire	Buckinghamshire
Cambridgeshire	Cambridgeshire (Note: Shared with Huntingdonshire)	Cambridgeshire	Cambridgeshire; Isle of Ely
Cheshire	Cheshire – Chester	Cheshire	Cheshire – Birkenhead – Chester – Stockport (Note: For judicial and lieutenancy purposes, Stockport south of the River Mersey and River Tame was in Cheshire, north of the rivers in Lancashire. In 1956 the whole borough was placed in Lancashire for judicial purposes whilst continuing to straddle the two counties for the purposes of lieutenancy.) – Wallasey (after 1913)
Cornwall	Cornwall	Cornwall	Cornwall; Isles of Scilly (Note: Sui generis authority created 1890.)
Cumberland	Cumberland	Cumberland	Cumberland – Carlisle (from 1915)
Derbyshire	Derbyshire	Derbyshire	Derbyshire – Derby
Devon	Devon – Exeter	Devon	Devon – Devonport (until 1914) – Exeter – Plymouth
Dorset	Dorset – Poole	Dorset	Dorset
Durham	Durham	Durham	Durham – Darlington (after 1915) – Gateshead – South Shields – Sunderland – West Hartlepool (after 1902)
Essex	Essex	Essex	Essex – East Ham (after 1915) – Southend-on-Sea (after 1914) – West Ham
Gloucestershire	Gloucestershire – Bristol – Gloucester	Gloucestershire	Gloucestershire – Bristol – Gloucester
Hampshire	Hampshire – Southampton	Hampshire	Hampshire; Isle of Wight (after 1890) – Bournemouth (after 1900) – Portsmouth – Southampton
Herefordshire	Herefordshire	Herefordshire	Herefordshire
Hertfordshire	Hertfordshire	Hertfordshire	Hertfordshire
Huntingdonshire	Huntingdonshire (Note: Shared with Cambridgeshire)	Huntingdonshire	Huntingdonshire
Kent	Kent – Canterbury	Kent	Kent – Canterbury
Lancashire	Lancashire	Lancashire	Lancashire – Barrow-in-Furness – Blackburn – Blackpool (after 1904) – Bolton – Bootle – Burnley – Bury – Liverpool – Manchester – Oldham – Preston – Rochdale – St Helens – Salford – Southport (after 1905) – Stockport – Warrington (after 1900) – Wigan
Leicestershire	Leicestershire	Leicestershire	Leicestershire – Leicester
Lincolnshire	Lincolnshire – Lincoln	Lincolnshire	Holland; Kesteven; Lindsey – Grimsby – Lincoln
London	County of London – City of London	County of London; City of London	London
Middlesex	Middlesex	Middlesex	Middlesex
Norfolk	Norfolk – Norwich	Norfolk	Norfolk – Great Yarmouth (Note: The county borough of Great Yarmouth straddled Norfolk and Suffolk for judicial and lieutenancy purposes, with the part north of the River Yare in Norfolk and south of it in Suffolk, until 1891 when the whole borough was placed in Norfolk for those purposes.) – Norwich
Northamptonshire	Northamptonshire	Northamptonshire	Northamptonshire; Soke of Peterborough – Northampton
Northumberland	Northumberland – Berwick-upon-Tweed – Newcastle-upon-Tyne	Northumberland	Northumberland – Newcastle-upon-Tyne – Tynemouth (after 1904)
Nottinghamshire	Nottingham – Nottingham	Nottinghamshire	Nottinghamshire – Nottingham
Oxfordshire	Oxfordshire	Oxfordshire	Oxfordshire – Oxford (after 1889) (Note: Oxford was briefly included in the administrative county of Oxfordshire created in April 1889, but was made a county borough in November 1889.)
Rutland	Rutland	Rutland	Rutland
Shropshire	Shropshire	Shropshire	Shropshire
Somerset	Somerset	Somerset	Somerset – Bath
Staffordshire	Staffordshire – Lichfield	Staffordshire	Staffordshire – Burton upon Trent (after 1901) – Hanley (until 1910) – Smethwick (from 1907) – Stoke-on-Trent (after 1910) – Walsall – West Bromwich – Wolverhampton
Suffolk	Suffolk	Suffolk	East Suffolk; West Suffolk – Great Yarmouth (part, until 1891) – Ipswich
Surrey	Surrey	Surrey	Surrey – Croydon
Sussex	Sussex	Sussex	East Sussex; West Sussex – Brighton – Eastbourne (after 1911) – Hastings
Warwickshire	Warwickshire	Warwickshire	Warwickshire – Birmingham – Coventry – Solihull (after 1964)
Westmorland	Westmorland	Westmorland	Westmorland
Wiltshire	Wiltshire	Wiltshire	Wiltshire
Worcestershire	Worcestershire – Worcester	Worcestershire	Worcestershire – Dudley – Worcester
Yorkshire	Yorkshire; Hallamshire (after 1962) – Kingston upon Hull – York	East Riding	East Riding – Kingston upon Hull
Yorkshire	Yorkshire; Hallamshire (after 1962) – Kingston upon Hull – York	North Riding	North Riding – Middlesbrough
Yorkshire	Yorkshire; Hallamshire (after 1962) – Kingston upon Hull – York	West Riding	West Riding – Barnsley (after 1913) – Bradford – Dewsbury (after 1913) – Doncaster (after 1927) – Halifax – Huddersfield – Leeds – Rotherham (after 1902) – Sheffield – Wakefield (after 1915) – York

More significant changes to the geographical counties were made in 1965 with the creation of Greater London and of Huntingdon and Peterborough, which resulted in the abolition of the offices of Lord Lieutenant of Middlesex, Lord Lieutenant of the County of London, and Lord Lieutenant of Huntingdonshire and the creation of the Lord Lieutenant of Greater London and of the Lord Lieutenant of Huntingdon and Peterborough.

== See also ==
- Counties of England
- Historic counties of England
- Counties in England by population
- List of ceremonial counties in England by GDP
- Lieutenancy areas of Scotland
- List of local governments in the United Kingdom
- Nomenclature of Territorial Units for Statistics
- Preserved counties of Wales
