= Parliamentary constituencies in Cumbria =

The county of Cumbria is divided into 6 county constituencies, one of which is partly in Lancashire.

== Constituencies ==
† Conservative ‡ Labour ¤ Liberal Democrat ¤ Reform UK

Name	Electorate	Majority (Note: The majority is the number of votes the winning candidate receives more than their nearest rival.)	Member of Parliament	Nearest opposition	Electoral wards	Map
Barrow and Furness	74,980	5,324	Michelle Scrogham‡	Simon Fell†	Barrow-in-Furness Borough Council: Barrow Island, Central, Dalton North, Dalton South, Hawcoat, Hindpool, Newbarns, Ormsgill, Parkside, Risedale, Roosecote, Walney North. Copeland Borough Council: Black Combe and Scafell, Millom. South Lakeland District Council: Broughton and Coniston (polling districts AHA, AHB, AHC, BZ, CA, CB, CL and CY), Furness Peninsula, Ulverston East, Ulverston West.	A small constituency in the south of the county. It includes a long but very thin island to the west of the mainland part of the constituency.
Carlisle	77,863	5,200	Julie Minns‡	John Stevenson†	Carlisle City Council: Belah and Kingmoor, Botcherby and Harraby North, Brampton and Fellside, Cathedral and Castle, Currock and Upperby, Denton Holme and Morton South, Harraby South and Parklands, Longtown and the Border, Newtown and Morton North, Sandsfield and Morton West, Stanwix and Houghton, Wetheral and Corby.	A small constituency, to the north of the centre of the county.
Morecambe and Lunesdale (Note: Cross-county constituency with Lancashire)	69,254	5,815	Lizzi Collinge ‡	David Morris †	City of Lancaster: Bare, Bolton & Slyne, Carnforth & Millhead, Halton-with-Aughton, Harbour, Heysham Central, Heysham North, Heysham South, Kellet, Lower Lune Valley, Overton, Poulton, Silverdale, Torrisholme, Upper Lune Valley, Warton, Westgate. South Lakeland: Arnside & Milnthorpe, Burton & Crooklands, Sedbergh & Kirkby Lonsdale	
Penrith and Solway	77,935	5,257	Markus Campbell-Savours‡	Mark Jenkinson†	Allerdale Borough Council: All Saints, Allhallow and Waverton, Aspatria, Boltons, Broughton St. Bridgets, Christchurch, Crummock and Derwent Valley, Ellen and Gilcrux, Keswick, Marsh and Warmpool, Maryport North, Maryport South, Silloth and Solway Coast, Warnell, Wigton and Woodside. Carlisle City Council: Dalston and Burgh. Eden District Council: Alston Moor, Hartside, Hesket, Kirkoswald, Langwathby, Lazonby, Penrith Carleton, Penrith East, Penrith North, Penrith Pategill, Penrith South, Penrith West, Skelton.	A large constituency, comprising the north and east of the county, and almost entirely surrounding a smaller constituency in the north.
Westmorland and Lonsdale	72,029	21,472	Tim Farron¤	Matty Jackman†	Eden District Council: Appleby (Appleby), Appleby (Bongate), Askham, Brough, Crosby Ravensworth, Dacre, Eamont, Greystroke, Kirkby Stephen, Kirkby Thore, Long Marton, Morland, Orton and Tebay, Ravenstonedale, Shap, Ullswater, Warcop. South Lakeland District Council: Ambleside and Grasmere, Bowness and Levens, Broughton and Coniston (polling districts AF, AO, AP, AQ, AS, AT, AU, BC, BDA, BDB, CX and DH), Cartmel, Grange, Kendal East, Kendal North, Kendal Rural, Kendal South and Natland, Kendal Town, Kendal West, Windermere.	A medium-to-large constituency in the south of the county.
Whitehaven and Workington	73,198	13,286	Josh MacAlister‡	David Surtees¤	Allerdale Borough Council: Dalton, Flimby, Harrington and Salterbeck, Moorclose and Moss Bay, St. John's, St. Michael's, Seaton and Northside, Stainburn and Clifton. Copeland Borough Council: Arlecdon and Ennerdale, Beckermet, Cleator Moor, Corkickle, Distington, Lowca and Parton, Egremont, Gosforth and Seascale, Hillcrest, Kells, Moor Row and Bigrigg, Moresby, St. Bees, Sneckyeat, Whitehaven Central, Whitehaven South	A medium constituency in the west of the county.

== 2024 boundary changes ==
See 2023 review of Westminster constituencies for further details.

Former name (Note: BC denotes borough constituency, CC denotes county constituency.)	Boundaries 2010-2024	Current name	Boundaries 2024–present
1. Barrow and Furness CC; 2. Carlisle BC; 3. Copeland CC; 4. Penrith and The Border CC; 5. Westmorland and Lonsdale CC; 6. Workington CC	2010-2024 Boundaries	1. Barrow and Furness CC; 2. Carlisle CC; 3. Morecambe and Lunesdale CC (Note: Morecambe and Lunesdale is a cross-county constituency, divided between northern Lancashire and southern Cumbria.); 4. Penrith and Solway CC; 5. Westmorland and Lonsdale CC; 6. Whitehaven and Workington CC	Boundaries from 2024

For the 2023 review of Westminster constituencies, which redrew the constituency map ahead of the 2024 United Kingdom general election, the Boundary Commission for England opted to combine Cumbria with Lancashire as a sub-region of the North West Region, with the existing seat of Morecambe and Lunesdale extending into southern Cumbria to create a cross-county boundary constituency. Copeland, Penrith and The Border, and Workington were abolished and replaced by the new constituencies of Penrith and Solway, and Whitehaven and Workington.

The following constituencies were proposed:

Containing electoral wards from Allerdale

- Penrith and Solway (part)
- Whitehaven and Workington (part)

Containing electoral wards from Barrow-in-Furness

- Barrow and Furness (part)

Containing electoral wards from Carlisle

- Carlisle
- Penrith and Solway (part)

Containing electoral wards from Copeland

- Barrow and Furness (part)
- Whitehaven and Workington (part)

Containing electoral wards from Eden

- Penrith and Solway (part)
- Westmorland and Lonsdale (part)

Containing electoral wards from South Lakeland

- Barrow and Furness (part)
- Morecambe and Lunesdale (part also in Lancaster in Lancashire)
- Westmorland and Lonsdale (part)

== Results history ==
Primary data source: House of Commons research briefing - General election results from 1918 to 2019

=== 2024 ===
The number of votes cast for each political party who fielded candidates in constituencies comprising Cumbria in the 2024 general election were as follows: (Note: Excludes the constituency of Morecambe and Lunesdale, which lies primarily in Lancashire.)

Party	Votes	%	Change from 2019	Seats	Change from 2019
Labour	81,131	35.4%	▲6.4%	4	▲4
Conservative	58,915	25.7%	▼26.8%	0	▼5
Liberal Democrats	41,654	18.2%	▲3.8%	1	0
Reform UK	37,683	16.5%	▲15.1%	0	0
Greens	7,811	3.4%	▲1.9%	0	0
Others	1,731	0.8%	▼0.4%	0	0
Total	228,925	100.0		5	

=== 2019 ===
The number of votes cast for each political party who fielded candidates in constituencies comprising Cumbria in the 2019 general election were as follows:

Party	Votes	%	Change from 2017	Seats	Change from 2017
Conservative	143,615	52.5%	▲3.7%	5	▲2
Labour	79,402	29.0%	▼7.2%	0	▼2
Liberal Democrats	39,426	14.4%	▲2.6%	1	0
Greens	4,223	1.5%	▲1.0%	0	0
Brexit	3,867	1.4%	new	0	0
Others	3,044	1.2%	▼1.5%	0	0
Total	273,577	100.0		6	

=== Percentage votes ===
Election year	1983	1987	1992	1997	2001	2005	2010	2015	2017	2019	2024
Conservative	46.7	48.1	46.3	33.5	39.5	37.9	39.4	40.7	48.8	52.5	25.7
Labour	31.2	33.1	36.9	45.8	39.1	34.8	30.8	29.8	36.2	29.0	35.4
Liberal Democrat^{1}	21.8	18.7	16.0	16.5	19.2	23.4	24.3	13.3	11.8	14.4	18.2
Green Party	-	*	*	*	*	*	0.6	3.4	0.5	1.5	3.4
UKIP	-	-	-	*	*	*	2.2	12.6	2.3	*	-
Reform UK^{2}	-	-	-	-	-	-	-	-	-	1.4	16.5
Other	0.3	0.1	0.8	4.1	2.3	3.9	2.8	0.2	0.4	1.2	0.8

^{1}1983 & 1987 - SDP–Liberal Alliance

^{2}2019 - Brexit Party

* Included in Other

=== Seats ===
Election year	1983	1987	1992	1997	2001	2005	2010	2015	2017	2019	2024
Labour	3	3	4	4	4	4	3	3	2	0	4
Liberal Democrat^{1}	0	0	0	0	0	1	1	1	1	1	1
Conservative	3	3	2	2	2	1	2	2	3	5	0
Total	6	6	6	6	6	6	6	6	6	6	5

^{1}1983 & 1987 - SDP–Liberal Alliance

=== Maps ===
==== 1885-1910: Cumberland and Westmorland ====
1885

1886

1892

1895

1900

1906

Jan 1910

Dec 1910

==== 1918-1945 ====
1918

1922

1923

1924

1929

1931

1935

1945

==== 1950-1979 ====
1950

1951

1955

1959

1964

1966

1970

Feb 1974

Oct 1974

1979

==== 1983-2024: Cumbria ====
1983

1987

1992

1997

2001

2005

2010

2015

2017

2019

==== 2024-present: Cumbria including one cross-county constituency ====
2024

== Historical representation by party ==
A cell marked → (with a different colour background to the preceding cell) indicates that the previous MP continued to sit under a new party name.

=== 1885 to 1918 ===
Conservative Independent Conservative Labour Liberal Liberal Unionist Speaker

Constituency	1885	86	1886	91	1892	95	1895	1900	05	1906	06	Jan 1910	Dec 1910	13	15	16
Appleby	W. Lowther				Savory			Rigg	Jones			Sanderson			H. C. Lowther	
Carlisle	Ferguson		Gully			→			Chance			Denman				
Cockermouth	Valentine		Lawson					Randles		Lawson	Randles		Lawson jnr			Bliss
Eskdale	Allison							C. W. H. Lowther		Howard			C. W. H. Lowther			
Egremont	Pennington				Ainsworth		Duncombe	Bain		Fullerton		Grant				
Kendal	Taylour				Bagot					Stewart-Smith		Bagot		Weston		
Penrith	Howard	→	J. Lowther						→							
Whitehaven	Cavendish-Bentinck			Bain	Little		Helder			Burnyeat		Jackson	Richardson			

=== 1918 to 1950 ===
Coalition Liberal (1918-22) / National Liberal (1922-23) Conservative Independent Parliamentary Group Labour Liberal Speaker

Constituency	1918	21	1922	1923	1924	26	1929	1931	1935	1945
Carlisle	Carr		Middleton		Watson		Middleton	Spears		Grierson
Cumberland North	C. W. Lowther	→	Howard			Graham			Roberts	
Penrith and Cockermouth	J. Lowther	H. C. Lowther	Collison	Dixey					Dower	
Westmorland	Weston				Stanley					Fletcher-Vane
Whitehaven	Grant		Duffy		Hudson		Price	Nunn	Anderson	
Workington	Cape									Peart

=== 1950 to 1983 ===
Conservative Labour

Constituency	1950	1951	1955	59	1959	1964	1966	1970	Feb 1974	Oct 1974	76	1979
Carlisle	Hargreaves		Johnson			Lewis						
Penrith and the Border	Scott		Whitelaw									
Westmorland	Fletcher-Vane					Jopling						
Whitehaven	Anderson			Symonds				Cunningham				
Workington	Peart										Page	Campbell-Savours

=== 1983 to 2024 ===
Conservative Independent The Independents Labour Liberal Democrats

Constituency	1983	83	1987	1992	1997	2001	2005	2010	2015	17	2017	18	19	2019
Barrow and Furness	Franks			Hutton				Woodcock				→	→	Fell
Carlisle	Lewis		Martlew					Stevenson						
Copeland	Cunningham						Reed			Harrison				
Penrith and the Border	Whitelaw	Maclean						Stewart					→	Hudson
Westmorland and Lonsdale	Jopling				Collins		Farron							
Workington	Campbell-Savours					Cunningham			Hayman					Jenkinson

=== 2024 to present ===
Constituency	2024
Barrow and Furness	Scrogham
Carlisle	Minns
Morecambe and Lunesdale (cross-county constituency)	Collinge
Penrith and Solway	Campbell-Savours
Westmorland and Lonsdale	Farron
Whitehaven and Workington	MacAlister

== See also ==
- Parliamentary constituencies in North West England
- List of United Kingdom Parliament constituencies
