= 1905 Carlisle by-election =

Parliamentary by-election

- 14 July 1905
Candidate	Chance	Sanderson
Party	Liberal	Conservative
Popular vote	3,616	2,586
Percentage	58.3%	41.7%
MP before election
William Gully
Liberal
Subsequent MP
Frederick Chance
Liberal

The 1905 Carlisle by-election was a Parliamentary by-election held on 14 July 1905. The constituency returned one Member of Parliament (MP) to the House of Commons of the United Kingdom, elected by the first past the post voting system.

== Vacancy and electoral history ==

The sitting MP, Rt Hon. William Gully resigned due to ill-health and was raised to the peerage with the title of Viscount Selby, of the City of Carlisle. He had been Liberal MP for the seat of Carlisle since the 1886 General Election. Since 1895 he had been Speaker of the House of Commons. The seat had been Liberal since 1868. After Gully became Speaker in 1895, the Conservatives, in accordance with the traditions of the time, chose not to oppose him at the 1900 general election.

== Candidates ==
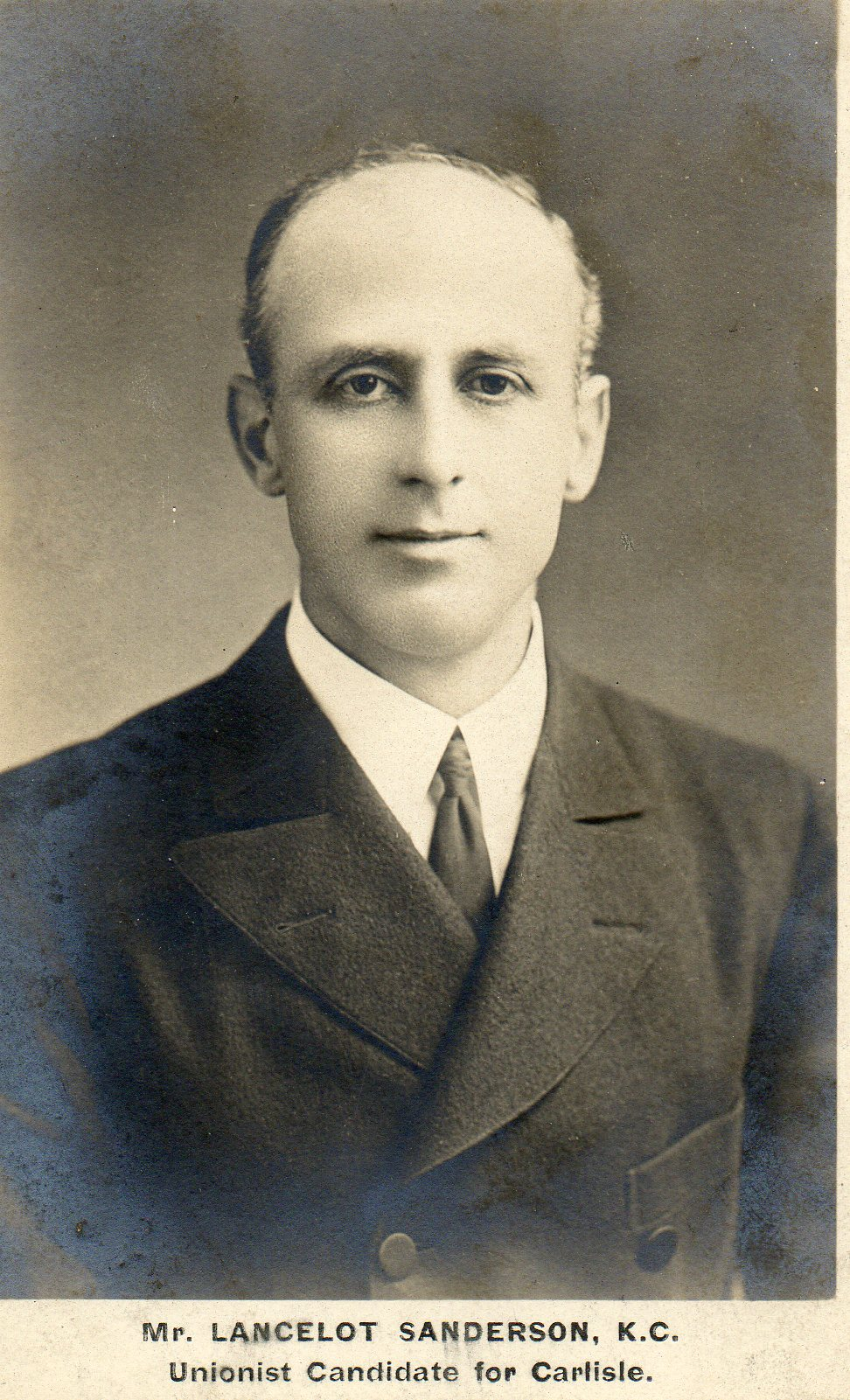

The Carlisle Liberal Association selected 53-year-old Frederick Chance as their candidate to defend the seat. Chance was from a long-established family of businessmen and politicians in Carlisle. He ran the family's cotton-manufacturing firm in the town, Ferguson Brothers, and served as Mayor of Carlisle in 1904, before becoming a member of Cumberland County Council. Both his grandfather Joseph Ferguson and his uncle Robert Ferguson had been Members of Parliament (MPs) for the borough of Carlisle and he was a brother-in-law of Sir Henry Seton-Karr, the MP for St Helens.

The Carlisle Conservative Association selected 42-year-old Lancelot Sanderson as their candidate to challenge for the seat. Sanderson was a barrister of the Inner Temple, he was appointed Recorder of Wigan in 1901 and took silk in 1903. He was also a cricketer. He played two first-class matches; the first for Lancashire in 1884, and the second for the Marylebone Cricket Club four years later.

== Campaign ==
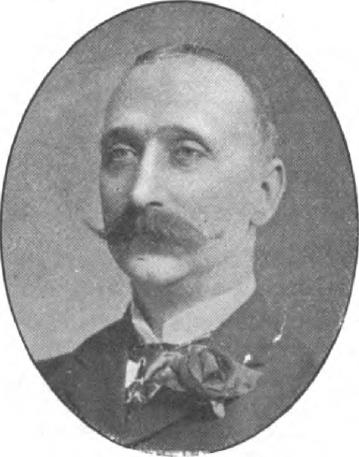
Bell

Polling Day was fixed for 14 July 1905. The small Carlisle branch of the Social Democratic Federation chose to play no part in the election and gave no advise to electors. Richard Bell, the General Secretary of the Amalgamated Society of Railway Servants sent a message urging working men not to support the Conservative candidate, stating that a vote for him would be against all labour members and the interests of labour. The constituency included about 700 Irish and Roman Catholic voters, so the issue of Irish Home Rule played a part. Chance, the Liberal candidate, did not fully support party policy of granting home rule to Ireland. As a result, the Irish Parliamentary Party chose not to give him their support and advised the Irish electors in Carlisle to remain neutral. The North of England Temperance League announced that as no candidate supported banning the sale of alcohol, they could not recommend either to the Carlisle electors.

== Result ==
The Liberals held the seat and won the largest majority in the history of the constituency:

Chance

1905 Carlisle by-election
Party	Candidate	Votes	%	±%
Liberal	Frederick Chance	3,616	58.3	N/A
Conservative	Lancelot Sanderson	2,586	41.7	New
Majority		1,030	16.6	N/A
Turnout		6,202	84.4	N/A
Liberal hold		Swing	N/A	

== Aftermath ==
Chance was re-elected unopposed in 1906, and held the seat until the January 1910 general election, when he did not stand again. Sanderson was elected as Member of Parliament (MP) for the Appleby division of Westmorland at the January 1910 general election.
