= James Bain (Egremont MP) =

British politician

Member of Parliament for Egremont
- In office 1 October 1900 – 12 January 1906
- Preceded by: Hubert Duncombe
- Succeeded by: Hugh Fullerton

Personal details
- Born: James Robert Bain; 1851 United Kingdom
- Died: 27 February 1913 (aged 61–62) London, United Kingdom
- Party: Conservative

James Robert Bain (1851 – 27 February 1913) was a British Conservative Party politician who represented Egremont, Cumberland in the House of Commons of the United Kingdom from 1900 to 1906.

He died at his home in London on 27 February 1913.

== Electoral history ==
General election 1900: Egremont
Party	Candidate	Votes	%	±%
Conservative	James Bain	3,917	53.7	+2.8
Liberal	David Ainsworth	3,377	46.3	−2.8
Majority		540	7.4	+5.6
Turnout		7,294	78.4	+8.3
Registered electors		9,303		
Conservative hold		Swing	+2.8	
