= List of MPs elected to the English parliament in 1295 =

This is a list of members of Parliament (MPs) elected to the Model Parliament of 1295. The Parliament first met on 13 November 1295 and lasted until it was dissolved on 4 December 1295.

== List of constituencies and members ==
=== Bedfordshire ===
Constituency	Members	Notes
Bedfordshire	Robertus de Hoo; David de Fletwyk; Radulphus de Goldintone	
Bedford	Johannes Cullebere; Simon de Holland	

=== Berkshire ===
Constituency	Members	Notes
Berkshire	Ricardus de Coleshull; Ricardus de Windelesore	
Reading	Galfridus de Engleys; Rlias de Baunbury	

=== Buckinghamshire ===
Constituency	Members	Notes
Buckinghamshire	Laurencius de Bluntesdene; Rogerus de Tyringham	

=== Cambridgeshire ===
Constituency	Members	Notes
Cambridgeshire	Simon de Bradenham; Robertus de Monasterlis	
Cambridge	Johannes de Cantebreg'; Benedictus Godsone	
Ely	Johannes de Palfrenur; Nicholaus Baret	

=== Cornwall ===
Constituency	Members	Notes
Cornwall	Willielmus de Chambernon; Reginaldus de Bevill	
Launceston	Johannes Gerveys; Stephan le Duk	
Liskeard	Rogerus de Polsboth; Willielmus de Barnestaple, vel Thomas de Stobehull	
Truro	Henricus le Bailly; Robertus Maynard	
Bodmin	Johannes Coulyng; Ricardus de Sancta Margareta	
Tregony	Rogerus de Penpol; Walterus de Meyvir	

=== Cumberland ===
Constituency	Members	Notes
Cumberland	Robertus de Haveryngton; Hubertus de Multon	
Carlisle	Robertus de Grenesdal; Andreas le Seler	
Cockermouth	Willielmus Bully; Petrus de Hale	
Egremont	Willielmus de Gylling; Alexander, fil' Ricardi	

=== Derbyshire ===
Constituency	Members	Notes
Derbyshire	Henricus de Knyveton; Egidius de Meynhill	
Derby	Johannes de la Cornere; Radulphus de Makeneye	

=== Devon ===
Constituency	Members	Notes
Devon	Robertus de Wodeton; Willielmus le Prus, vel Pruz	
Exeter	Walterus de Langedon, vel Langedyn; Thomas Fatheyn; Martinus Scot	
Totnes	Johannes de Blakedon	
Barnstaple	Willielmus de Barnstaple; Durant le Cordwaner	
Plympton	Johannes Ghoste; Ricardus Herberd	
Torrington	Robertus le Hyreys; Willielmus le Rede, de Bydford	
Tavistock	Radulphus de Setchevill; Walterus le Wise	

=== Dorset ===
Constituency	Members	Notes
Dorset	Robertus Martyn; Hugo de Strode	
Dorchester	Willielmus Cole; Thomas de Somenou	
Shaftesbury	Johannes Cokayn; Hugo Gappe	
Lyme Regis	Willielmus de Tuluse; Galfridus le Keu	
Bridport	Rogerus de Mayne; Johannes Aleyn	

=== Essex ===
Constituency	Members	Notes
Essex	Johannes Filliol; Radulphus de Ardern'	
Colchester	Elias fil' Johannis; Hubertus de Colecestr'	

=== Herefordshire ===
Constituency	Members	Notes
Herefordshire	Robertus le Wyne; Rogerus de Burghulle	
Hereford	Willielmus Godknave; Johannes Lytfot	
Ledbury	Rogerus Caperun; Johannes Basevylle	
Leominster	Thomas de Radyng; Johannes Coykyng	
Weobley	Johannes Cunpaygnoun; Adam Sagoun	

=== Hertfordshire ===
Constituency	Members	Notes
Hertfordshire	Johannes fil' Simon'; Rogerus Bryen	

=== Huntingdonshire ===
Constituency	Members	Notes
Huntingdonshire	Alanus de Chartres; Robertus de Bayeuse	
Huntingdon	Nicholaus Caperoun; Ricardus le Teynturner	

=== Kent ===
Constituency	Members	Notes
Kent	Stephanus Chuche; Walterus de Ripple	
Canterbury	Henricus Danyel; Reginaldus Hurel	
Rochester	Johannes de Sancto Dyonisio; Benedictus Petyn	
Tunbridge	Johannes Goman; Johannes Martyn	

=== Lancashire ===
Constituency	Members	Notes
Lancashire	Mattheys de Redman; Johannes de Ewyas	
Preston	Willielmus fil' Pauli; Adam Russel	
Lancaster	Lambertus le Despenser; Willielmus le Chanter	
Wigan	Willielmus le Teinterer; Henricus le Bocher	
Liverpool	Adam fil' Ricardi; Robertus Pynklowe	

=== Leicestershire ===
Constituency	Members	Notes
Leicestershire	Robertus de Wyvill; Johannes de Aungerville	
Leicester	Radulphus Norman; Robertus de Scharnford	

=== Lincolnshire ===
Constituency	Members	Notes
Lincolnshire	Ranulphus de Otteby; Radulphus de Littlebury	
Lincoln	Willielmus Cause; Petrus de Thornhawe	
Grimsby	Gilbertus de Reyner; Willielmus de Donudale	
Stamford	Nicholaus de Burton; Clemens de Melton	

=== Middlesex ===
Constituency	Members	Notes
Middlesex	Willielmus de Brok'; Stephanus de Gravesend	

=== Norfolk ===
Constituency	Members	Notes
Norfolk	No Returns found	

=== Northamptonshire ===
Constituency	Members	Notes
Northamptonshire	Johannes Doyley de Stoke; Willielmus Murdak	
Northampton	Osbertus de Crowthorpe; Philippus le Rous	

=== Northumberland ===
Constituency	Members	Notes
Northumberland	Walterus de Cambou; Willielmus de Halton	
Newcastle	Hugo de Karliolo; Petrus le Graper	
Bamborough	Johannes de Greystans; Willielmus le Coroner	
Corbridge	Adam fil' Alani; Hugo fil' Hugonis	

=== Nottinghamshire ===
Constituency	Members	Notes
Nottinghamshire	Gervasius de Clyfton; Johannes de Annesleye	
Nottingham	Johannes le Flemeng; Willielmus de Herdebye	

=== Oxfordshire ===
Constituency	Members	Notes
Oxfordshire	Robertus Pogeys; Johannes de Elsefeld	
Oxford	Thomas de Sowy; Andreas de Pyrie	
Wallingford	Johannes Maryot; Johannes Bone	

=== Rutland ===
Constituency	Members	Notes
Rutland	Robertus de Flikesthorp; Simon de Bokminstr'	

=== Salop ===
Constituency	Members	Notes
Shropshire	Robertus Corbet; Rogerus Sprughos'	
Shrewsbury	Ricardus Stuyre; Galfridus Rondolfe	
Bridgnorth	Andreas Boldyng; Fremundus de Erdyngton	

=== Somerset ===
Constituency	Members	Notes
Somerset	Simon de Ralegh; Willielmus de Staunton	
Bath	Thomas Iweyn; Johannes le Luns	
Axbridge	Walterus de la Mare; Henricus de la Chambre	
Wells	Johannes de Farindon; Robertus Bouche	
Taunton	Ricardus Segere; Walterus de Pintlegh	
Bridgwater	Johannes de la Weye; Walterus Jacob	

=== Southampton ===
Constituency	Members	Notes
Southampton	Johannes Ramyn; Johannes le Fauconer; Baldewinus de Bello Alneto; Johannes de Popham	
Alresford	Willielmus de Overton; Willielmus Alayne	
Alton	Galfridus Touz; Alanus de Bradeleye	
Andover	Johannes Oriold; Ricardus Lotyn	
Basingstoke	Johannes de la Coufaud; Johannes de la Burgh	
Overton	Johannes Pistor; Willielmus Horn	
Portsmouth	Ricardus de Reyveld; Stephanus Justice	
Southampton	Petrus de Lyons; Johannes de la Barre	
Winchester	Laurencius de Anne; Johannes de Tytynges	
Yarmouth and Newport	Walterus de Wyte; Petrus de Coskevylle	

=== Staffordshire ===
Constituency	Members	Notes
Staffordshire	Henricus de Creswall; Ricardus Caverswall	
Stafford	Willielmus Reyner; Johannes Beton	

=== Suffolk ===
Constituency	Members	Notes
Suffolk	No Returns found	

=== Surrey ===
Constituency	Members	Notes
Surrey	Thomas de Sithesaye; Willielmus Aumbesas	
Southwark	Ricardus le Clerk; Willielmus Dynnok	
Blechingly [sic]	Ricardus de Bodekesham; Johannes de Geyhesham	
Reigate	Rogerus le Carreuer; Robertus Sakel	
Guildford	Andreas le Conestable; Johannes Nichol'	

=== Sussex ===
Constituency	Members	Notes
Sussex	Hamo Bovet; Robertus de Passelagh	
Chichester	Willielmus de Ertham; Clemens de Addesdene	
Horsham	Walterus Randolf; Walterus Burgeys	
Lewes	Gervasius de Wolvehope; Ricardus le Palmere	
Shoreham	Rogerus de Beauchamp; Thomas Pontoyse	
Bramber	Johannes Testard; Ricardus le Eveske	
Arundel	Thomas de Yawtin; Johannes Ali'aundre	

=== Warwickshire ===
Constituency	Members	Notes
Warwickshire	Radulphus de Schirle; Johannes de Somervill	
Coventry	Aunketious de Coleshull; Ricardus de Weston	
Warwick	Johannes de la Porte; Robertus del Hurst	

=== Westmorland ===
Constituency	Members	Notes
Westmoreland	Robertus de Engleys; Thomas de Derwentwater	
Appleby	Robertus de Goldington; Johannes de Karleolo	

=== Wiltshire ===
Constituency	Members	Notes
Wiltshire	Henricus de Pratell'; Henricus de Thistledene	
Salisbury	Ricardus Pynnok; Johannes de Braundeston	
Wilton	Willielmus Scriptor; Thomas Sellyman	
Downton	Johannes Spede; Ricardus de la Sale	
Bradford	Thomas Deudans; Willielmus Wager	
Chippenham	Johannes de Burle; Robertus Osegod	
Calne	Willielmus le Escryveyn; Willielmus le Chelfurist	
Devizes	Gilbertus Fraunceys, junior Petrus de Paulesholte	
Ludgershall	Willielmus de Lekford; Johannes Dyeuteyt	
Bedwin	Willielmus Russell; Johannes Fynamur	
Cricklade	Johannes Ildolfe; Ricardus Pernaunt	
Malmesbury	Rogerus Hasard; Bartholomeus Aunger	
Old Sarum	Hugo Sener; Petrus le Wayte	
Marlborough	Philippus de Stamburule [__] Nyweman	

=== Worcestershire ===
Constituency	Members	Notes
Worcestershire	Willielmus le Seneschal; Simon de Crumbe	
Bromsgrove	Thomas Rastel; Thomas de Burneford	
Worcester	Ricardus le Leebur'; Walterus de Caleweton	
Droitwich	Hugo Aleyn; Petrus Bond	
Dudley	Benedictus Andreu; Radulphus Clericus	
Evesham	Willielmus de Sodinton; Robertus de Hales	
Kidderminster	Walterus Caldrigan; Walterus Lihfot	
Pershore	Willielmus de Sennecourt; Henricus de la Buyhte	

=== Yorkshire ===
Constituency	Members	Notes
Yorkshire	Petrus Becard; Simon de Gousel	
York	Nicholaus de Seleby; Rogerus Basy	
Tickhill	Johannes Bote; Ricardus fil' Ricardi de Estfeld	
Scarborough	Radulphus Gegge; Willielmus, fil' Nicholai	
Pickering	Robertus Turcock; Robertus Turcock	
Beverley	Johannes Jordan; Thomas de Hayton	
Yarum	Franciscus de Aula; Radulphus de Estre	
Malton	Mattheus de Malton; Johannes de Ebor' de Malton	
Thirsk	Robertus Yol; Walterus le Taylur	
Hedon	Stephanus de Burton; Ricardus Civis	
Ripon	Johannes de Stapleford; Johannes de Ebor'	
Pontefract	Robertus Harald; Willielmus de Beatly	

== Sources ==
- The Lord Monson, Members of Parliament. Return to two orders of the honourable the House of Commons, dated 4 May 1876 and 9 March 1877, Part I. Parliaments of England, 1213-1702 pp. 4–6 (London: House of Commons, 1878)

== See also ==
- Model Parliament
