= John Ure =

John Ure may refer to:

- Sir John Ure (diplomat) (1931–2023), British ambassador and author
- Ian Ure (John Francombe Ure, born 1939), Scottish former footballer
- Sir John Ure (Lord Provost) (1824–1901), Lord Provost of Glasgow, 1880–1883
