= Frederick Chance =

British Liberal Party politician from Carlisle (1852–1932)

Frederick Chance

Sir Frederick William Chance KBE JP DL (26 December 1852 – 31 August 1932) was a British Liberal Party politician from Carlisle. He sat in the House of Commons from 1905 to 1910.

== Background ==
Chance was from a long-established family of businessmen and politicians in Carlisle. He ran the family's cotton-manufacturing firm in the town, Ferguson Brothers, and served as Mayor of Carlisle in 1904, before becoming a member of Cumberland County Council. Both his grandfather Joseph Ferguson and his uncle Robert Ferguson had been Members of Parliament (MPs) for the borough of Carlisle and he was a brother-in-law of Sir Henry Seton-Karr, the MP for St Helens.

Carlisle's MP since 1886 was William Court Gully, who served as Speaker of the House of Commons from 1895 to 1905. Ill-health forced Gully to resign as Speaker in May 1905, and at the by-election in July 1905 Chance was elected as the Member of Parliament (MP) for Carlisle. He was re-elected unopposed in 1906, and held the seat until the January 1910 general election, when he did not stand again.

He was High Sheriff of Cumberland in 1915.

Parliament of the United Kingdom
| Preceded by William Gully | Member of Parliament for Carlisle; 1905 – January 1910 | Succeeded by Richard Denman |
