= Cumberland Iron Ore Miners' and Kindred Trades' Association =

English trade union

- Predecessor: National Association of Blastfurnacemen
- Merged into: National Union of General and Municipal Workers
- Founded: 1891
- Dissolved: 1929
- Headquarters: Alva House, Moor Row
- Location: England
- Members: 3.000 (1926)
- Key people: Thomas Gavan Duffy (Gen Sec)
- Affiliations: Blastfurnacemen; Cumberland & N Lancs Fed

The Cumberland Iron Ore Miners' and Kindred Trades' Association was a trade union, principally representing iron ore miners in the Cumberland area of North West England.

== History ==
Although there were some attempts among iron ore miners in Cumberland to form a union in the 1860s and 1870s, the first successful union was the Dalton and District United Workmen's Association, established in 1882. This affiliated to the Cumberland Miners' Association, from which Andrew Sharp frequently spoke in its support. Despite this, it was unable to successfully organise miners outside Dalton, leaving the field open for the National Association of Blastfurnacemen. The Blastfurnacemen did build up membership among iron ore miners in the area, but struggled to operate as a national union. As part of a restructure which formed the National Federation of Blastfurnacemen, in 1891 the Cumberland iron ore miners registered their own union, the West Cumberland Workmen's Association. It had about 800 members and, despite its name, was restricted to iron ore miners. It worked with the Cumberland Miners, the Cumberland County Colliery Enginemen's Association, local branches of the Blastfurnacemen and also some branches of the Typographical Association in the Cumberland and North Lancashire Federation.

Over time, the union settled on a structure of seven branches, in Cleator Moor, Egremont, Frizington, Kirkland, Moor Row, Rowrah, and Whitehaven, and by 1907 membership had grown to 2,500. In about 1894, James Flynn was appointed as general secretary of the union. By 1907, he had become frustrated with its structure, where each branch had a high degree of autonomy, and elected one member of its council for each 100 members of the branch. He proposed a reorganisation wherein each mine would become its own lodge and elected one delegate of the council. Much of the existing council opposed this change, in particular those from the large branch at Egrement, and the union voted to give Flynn notice.

In place of Flynn, the union appointed Thomas Gavan Duffy as its general secretary. Gavan Duffy was a member of the Independent Labour Party who had recently been on a speaking tour of Cumberland. The union's members voted 1,644 to 108 for his appointment, but Flynn refused to recognise him, or hand over account books and the union banner. Flynn used the union's office to set up a rival National Iron Ore Miners' Association, with his supporters, this union gaining favour with mine owners by proving more flexible in negotiations.

Gavan Duffy initially worked from temporary offices in Moor Row, and successfully rebuilt the union. He invested some funds in the Workington Iron and Steel Company, through this mechanism gaining accurate information on the finances of the mine owners. By 1914, the union was able to open new offices in Bowthorn. At the 1918 UK general election, it sponsored Gavan Duffy as a Labour Party candidate in Whitehaven. Although he did not win on this occasion, he won the seat in 1922, holding it until the 1924 UK general election.

While the union long remained a member of the National Federation of Blastfurnacemen, when in 1909 the federation became the more centralised National Federation of Blastfurnacemen, Ore Miners and Kindred Trades, the union chose to remain independent. Its membership rebounded, reaching 3,000 by 1926. The Blastfurnacemen continued to try to interest the union in a merger, but in 1929, against their protests, the Iron Ore Miners voted 2,005 to 216 to merge into the National Union of General and Municipal Workers.

== Election results ==
The union sponsored Gavan Duffy as a Labour Party candidate in several Parliamentary elections.

Election	Constituency	Candidate	Votes	Percentage	Position
1918 general election	Whitehaven	Thomas Gavan Duffy	9,016	45.6	2
1922 general election	Whitehaven	Thomas Gavan Duffy	10,935	45.3	1
1923 general election	Whitehaven	Thomas Gavan Duffy	12,419	53.0	1
1924 general election	Whitehaven	Thomas Gavan Duffy	11,741	47.2	2

== General Secretaries ==
1894: James Flynn
1907: Thomas Gavan Duffy
