= 1959 Whitehaven by-election =

UK parliamentary by-election

The 1959 Whitehaven by-election on 18 June 1959 was held after the death of Labour Member of Parliament (MP) Frank Anderson on 25 April the same year. The seat was retained by Labour.

== Result ==
Whitehaven, by-election 1959
| Party | Candidate | Votes | % | ±% |
|---|---|---|---|---|
| Labour | Joseph Symonds | 21,457 | 58.61 | +0.57 |
| Conservative | Godfrey William Iredell | 15,151 | 41.39 | −0.57 |
| Majority | | 6,306 | 17.22 | +1.14 |
| Turnout | | 36,608 | | |
| Labour hold | | Swing | | |
