= Sir James Augustus Grant, 1st Baronet =

British Conservative Party politician (1867-1932)

Sir James Augustus Grant 1st Baronet

Member of Parliament for Egremont
- In office 1910–1918
- Preceded by: Hugh Fullerton
- Succeeded by: Constituency abolished

Member of Parliament for Whitehaven
- In office 1918–1922
- Preceded by: Thomas Richardson
- Succeeded by: Thomas Gavan-Duffy

Member of Parliament for South Derbyshire
- In office 1924–1929
- Preceded by: Henry Lorimer
- Succeeded by: David Pole

Personal details
- Born: 3 March 1867 Jalandhar, India
- Died: 29 July 1932 (aged 65) Gloucester, England
- Party: Conservative
- Spouse: Nina Frances Kennard (m. 1896)
- Children: 2
- Parents: James Augustus Grant (father); Margaret Laurie (mother)
- Relatives: Nina Kennard (mother-in-law); Anselm Guise (son-in-law)
- Education: Christ Church, Oxford

Sir James Augustus Grant, 1st Baronet (3 March 1867 – 29 July 1932) was a British Conservative Party politician.

== Early life ==
Born in Jalandhar, India, he was the son of the Scottish explorer James Augustus Grant and his wife Margaret Laurie. He matriculated at Christ Church, Oxford in 1886.

After university, Grant worked in South Africa on the Kimberley–Bechuanaland railway. He accompanied Joseph Thomson on his final expedition of 1890. At this point he was working for the British South Africa Company and Cecil Rhodes, a contact of his father. With Frank Elliott Lochner of the Bechuanaland Police and Alfred Sharpe, Thomson and Grant went to visit Msiri of Garenganze, seeking mineral rights.

== Politician ==
Grant was Member of Parliament (MP) for Egremont from January 1910 until the constituency was abolished for the 1918 general election. He was then elected as MP for Whitehaven, but lost that seat at the 1922 general election to Labour Party candidate Thomas Gavan Duffy. Grant was strongly opposed to extending the franchise to women. During a parliamentary debate on the bill which became the Representation of the People Act 1918 he said: "We are controlled and worried enough by women, and I have heard no reason why we should alter the present state of affairs."

Grant did not contest the 1923 general election, but returned to the House of Commons at the 1924 general election as MP for South Derbyshire. He retired from Parliament at the 1929 election, having been made a baronet, in the 1926 Birthday Honours, of Househill, Nairn.

The baronetcy became extinct on Grant's death in Gloucester in 1932, aged 65.

== Family ==
Grant married in 1896 Nina Frances Kennard, daughter of Arthur Challis Kennard and his wife the novelist Nina H. Kennard (1844–1926). Their daughter Nina Margaret Sophie in 1924 married Sir Anselm Guise, 6th Baronet, of Elmore Court, Gloucestershire, and they had two sons and a daughter, including Sir John Grant Guise, 7th Baronet (1927–2007). A younger daughter Hester, born 1899, married in 1923 Arthur Darley Bridge of the Coldstream Guards.

== Sources ==
- Craig, F. W. S. (1983) [1969]. British parliamentary election results 1918-1949 (3rd ed.). Chichester: Parliamentary Research Services. ISBN 0-900178-06-X.
- Leigh Rayment's list of baronets
- Leigh Rayment's Historical List of MPs

Parliament of the United Kingdom
Preceded by Hugh Fullerton	Member of Parliament for Egremont; 1910–1918	Constituency abolished
Preceded by Thomas Richardson	Member of Parliament for Whitehaven; 1918–1922	Succeeded by Thomas Gavan-Duffy
Preceded by Henry Lorimer	Member of Parliament for South Derbyshire; 1924–1929	Succeeded by David Pole
Baronetage of the United Kingdom
New creation	Baronet (of Househill, Nairn); 1926–1932	Extinct
