= William Burnyeat =

British politician (1874–1916)

William John Dalzell Burnyeat MA (13 March 1874 – 8 May 1916) was a British Liberal Party politician.

== Background ==
He was the eldest son of William Burnyeat and Sarah Frances Dalzell, of Moresby, Cumberland. He was educated at Rugby School, Corpus Christi College, Oxford (Exhibitioner). He married in 1908, Hildegard Retzlaff of Friedenau, Berlin. She was considered a risk under the Defence of the Realm Act during the First World War and interned. On Burnyeat's death in May 1916 she was released.

== Career ==
He was Called to the bar, Inner Temple in 1899 and practised on the Northern Circuit. He served as Liberal MP for Whitehaven from 1906 to 1910. Standing for the first time, he gained the seat from the Conservative at the 1906 General Election. He served just one full parliamentary term and chose not to defend his seat at the January 1910 General Election. He did not stand for parliament again. He was a justice of the peace.

== Sources ==
- Who Was Who
- British parliamentary election results 1885–1918, Craig, F. W. S.

Parliament of the United Kingdom
| Preceded by Augustus Helder | Member of Parliament for Whitehaven; 1906 – January 1910 | Succeeded by John Arthur Jackson |
