= Tim Westoll =

English barrister and politician (1918–1999)

James Westoll DL (26 July 1918 – 7 February 1999), known as Tim Westoll, was an English barrister, country landowner, politician, ornithologist, and racehorse owner.

He was baptised and registered as James Westoll, but from childhood was always known as Tim.

== Life ==
Westoll was the son of Captain James Westoll, late Durham Light Infantry, by his marriage in 1917 to Marian Ellen, a daughter of Captain Arthur Lenox Napier OBE DL, of the Yorkshire Regiment, and the grandson of another James Westoll, a Justice of the Peace, of Coniscliffe in County Durham. The Westolls were a Sunderland shipping family, but a year after Westoll's birth in 1918 his father bought a sporting estate in Cumberland, near the Solway Firth, and he was brought up and spent his adult life there. Educated at Eton and Trinity College, Cambridge, at the outbreak of the Second World War in 1939 Westoll joined the Border Regiment and was posted to the coast of Kent. He was commissioned as a second lieutenant on 11 February 1940. His battalion was part of 15th Scottish Division, and took part in the D-Day landings and the liberation of Europe, taking him as far as the Baltic Sea. He was Mentioned in Despatches on 4 April 1946 and retired the service at the end of the war with the rank of acting major.

In 1946, Westoll married Sylvia Jane, the youngest daughter of Sir Fairfax Luxmoore (1876–1944), a Lord Justice of Appeal, and they had four children. After the war, he was admitted to Lincoln's Inn, from where he was called to the Bar, and worked in the family shipping business, James Westoll, Ltd., of John Street, Sunderland, until it was sold in the 1950s. He never practised as a barrister, but from 1960 to 1971 was a Deputy Chairman of the Cumberland Quarter Sessions.

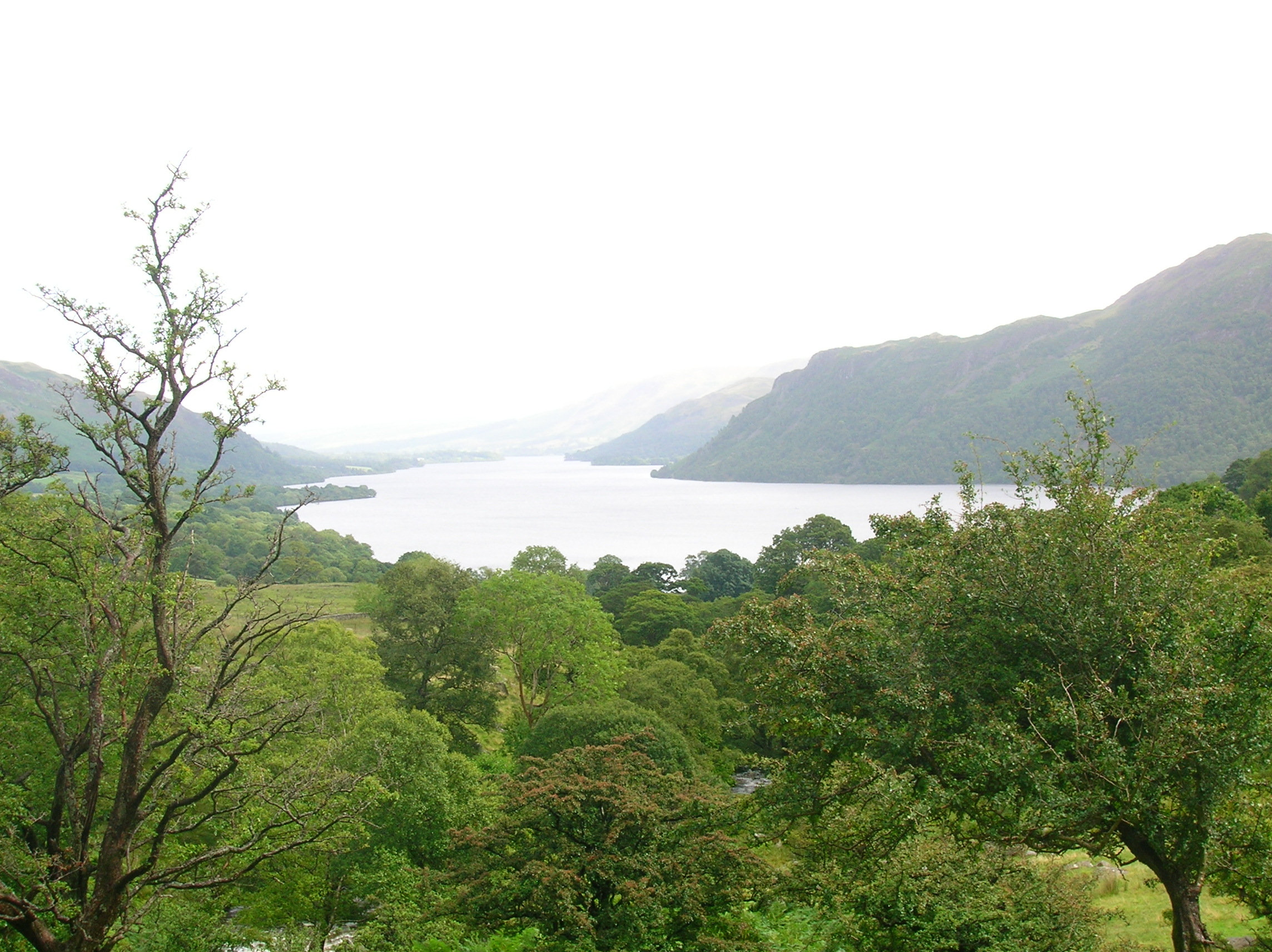
Ullswater

Elected to Cumberland County Council as an independent, he became Chairman of the Council in 1958, continuing in the role until the council came to an end in 1974. In 1965, the Manchester Water Authority applied for permission to extract water from Ullswater, which would have changed the landscape significantly. Westoll took a legal battle all the way to the House of Lords, winning it in an early victory for the environmental lobby. In the 1970s, after Cumberland County Council was abolished, the new county council proved to be more divided by party politics, and although Westoll disliked the new working atmosphere he was chosen as the first Chairman of the new authority.

At different times he was a Deputy Lieutenant of Cumberland (1963), High Sheriff of Cumberland (1964) and Master of the Worshipful Company of Clothworkers (1983). He was also chairman of Carlisle Racecourse and a director of Cumberland Newspapers. On Sundays, he played the organ in the parish church of Kirkandrews-on-Eden, and died on 7 February 1999, a few hours after doing so.

He began to paint birds as a boy, and not long before his death he completed the publication of his book The Complete Illustrated Check List of the Birds of the World, on which he had been working for twenty-five years. For this, he painted in watercolour more than 10,300 species of bird, as listed by Edward S. Gruson's Checklist of the Birds of the World (1976).

At Carlisle Racecourse, a race called the Tim Westoll Memorial Maiden Stakes, run over six furlongs, was established in his memory.

== Honours ==
- Officer of the Order of Saint John, 1969, promoted to Knight, 1983
- Honorary Doctor of Laws of the University of Leeds, 1984
- Cumberland county president of the St John Ambulance Brigade
