= George Lyall (1819–1881) =

British politician (1819-1881)

Member of Parliament for Whitehaven
- In office 17 December 1857 – 11 July 1865
- Preceded by: Robert Hildyard
- Succeeded by: George Cavendish-Bentinck

Personal details
- Born: 1819
- Died: 12 October 1881 (aged 62)
- Party: Conservative

George Lyall (1819 – 12 October 1881) was a British Conservative politician, and Governor of the Bank of England 1871–1873.

Lyall was first elected Conservative MP for Whitehaven at a by-election in 1857—caused by the death of Robert Hildyard—and held the seat until 1865 when he stood down.

Parliament of the United Kingdom
Preceded by Robert Hildyard	Member of Parliament for Whitehaven; 1857–1865	Succeeded by George Cavendish-Bentinck
