= Robert Hildyard (MP for Whitehaven) =

British politician

Robert Charles Hildyard

Member of Parliament for Whitehaven
- In office 28 August 1847 – 7 December 1857
- Preceded by: Matthias Attwood
- Succeeded by: George Lyall

Personal details
- Born: 1800
- Died: 7 December 1857 (aged 57)
- Party: Conservative
- Parent(s): Son of Reverend William Hildyard (Hildyards of Winestead), older brother of Henry Hildyard, father of Lucy Harriette Robinson (nee Hildyard) - have portrait.

Robert Charles Hildyard (1800 – 7 December 1857) was a British Conservative politician.

Hildyard was born in Winestead, East Riding of Yorkshire in 1800. He was educated at St Catharine's College, Cambridge (then known as Katharine Hall), and was President of the Cambridge Union Society in 1824. He was first elected Conservative MP for Whitehaven at the 1847 general election and held the seat until his death in 1857.

Parliament of the United Kingdom
Preceded by Matthias Attwood	Member of Parliament for Whitehaven; 1847–1857	Succeeded by George Lyall
