= William Collins (Lord Provost) =

Scottish Editor and Publisher (1817–1895)

Sir William Collins
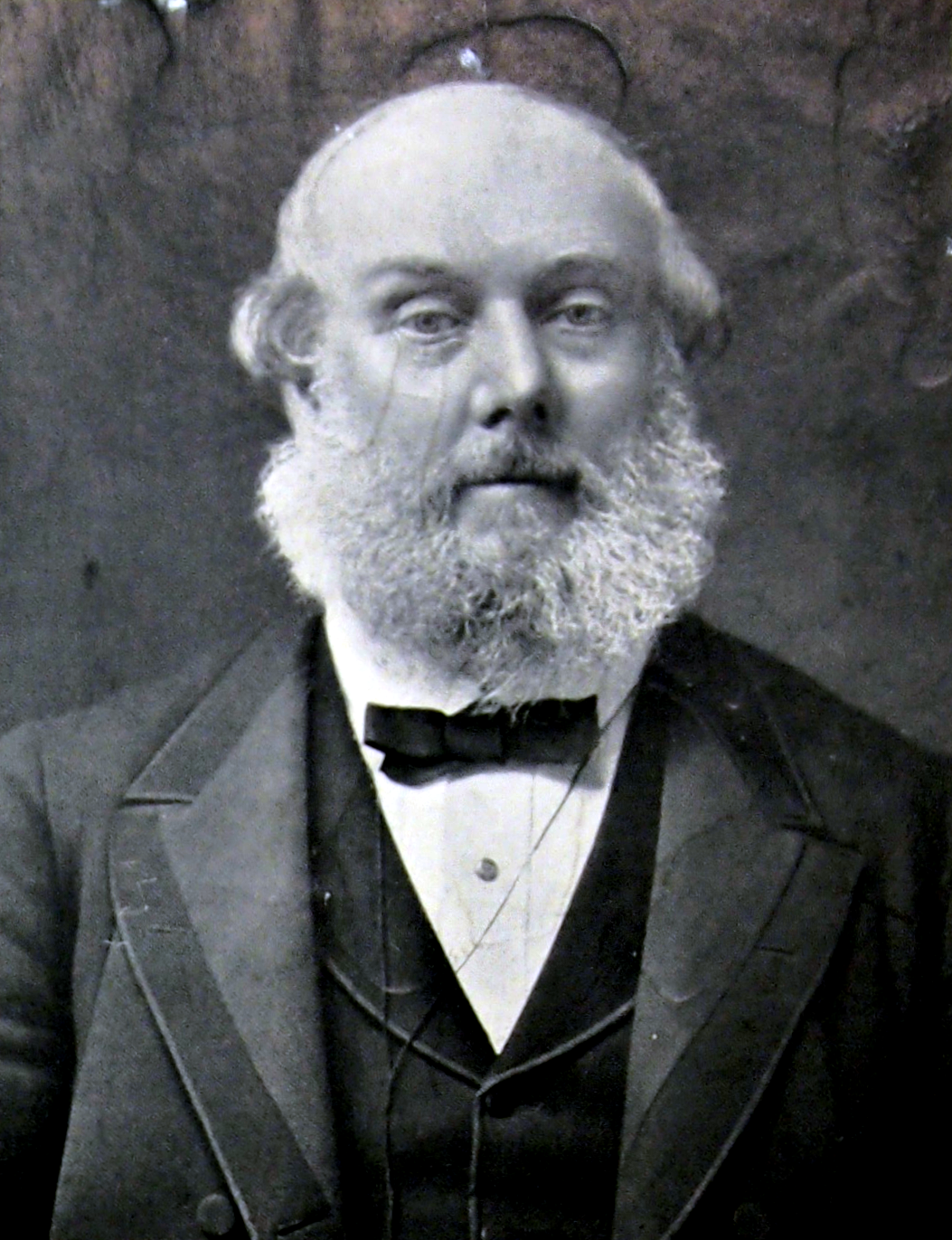

Lord Provost of Glasgow
- In office 1877–1880
- Preceded by: James Bain
- Succeeded by: John Ure

Glasgow City Councillor for Fifth Ward
- Incumbent
- Assumed office 1868

Personal details
- Born: 12 October 1817 Glasgow
- Died: 20 February 1895 (aged 77)
- Parents: William Collins (father); Jane Barclay (mother)

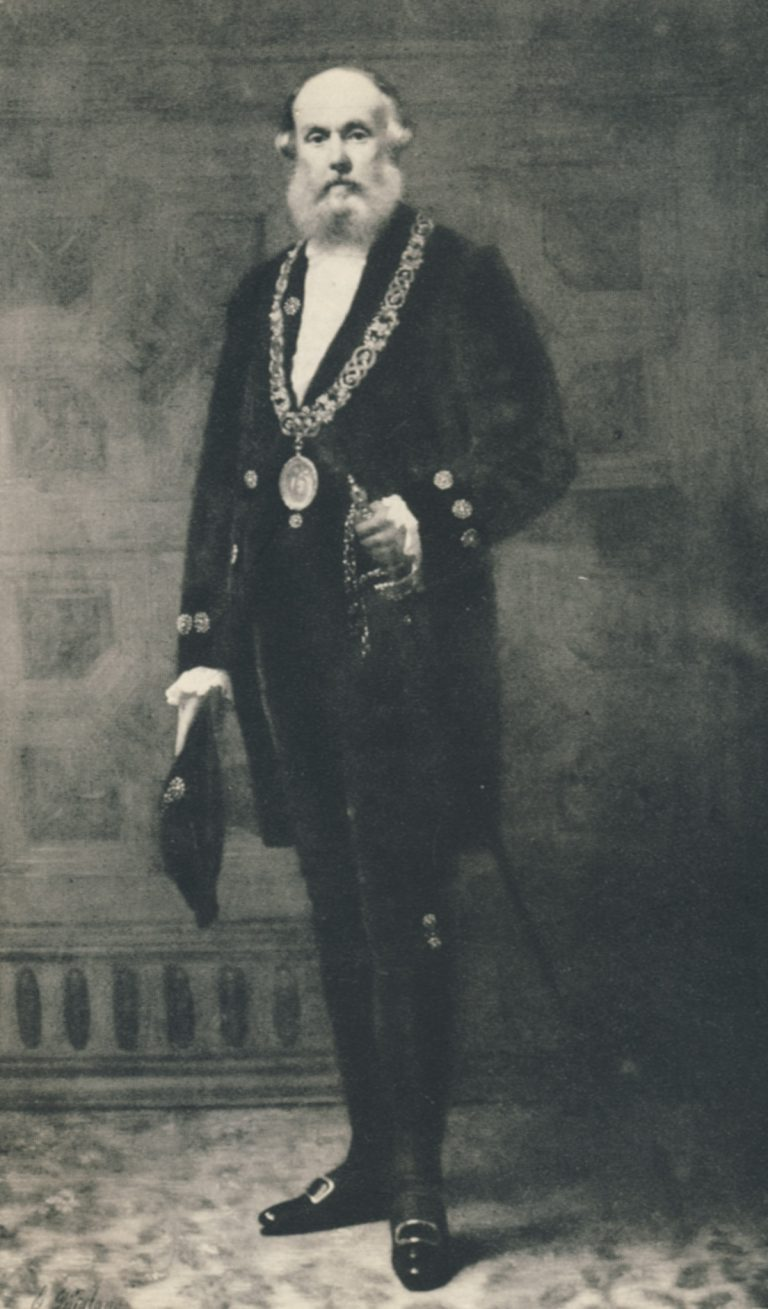
Sir-William-Collins-1817-1895-Lord-Provost

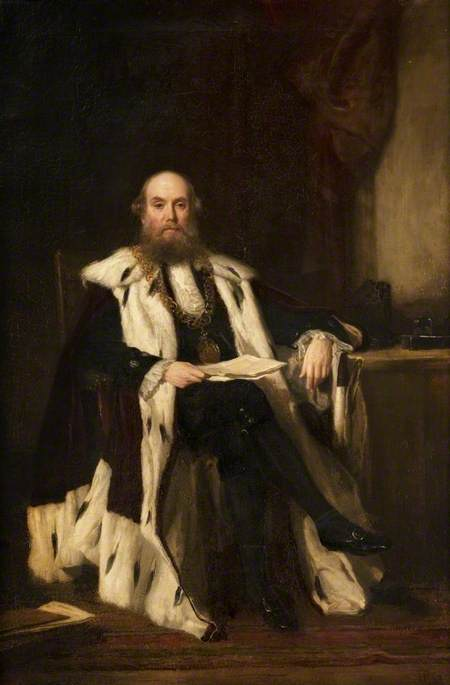
Sir William Collins - Glasgow Provost - en Regalia

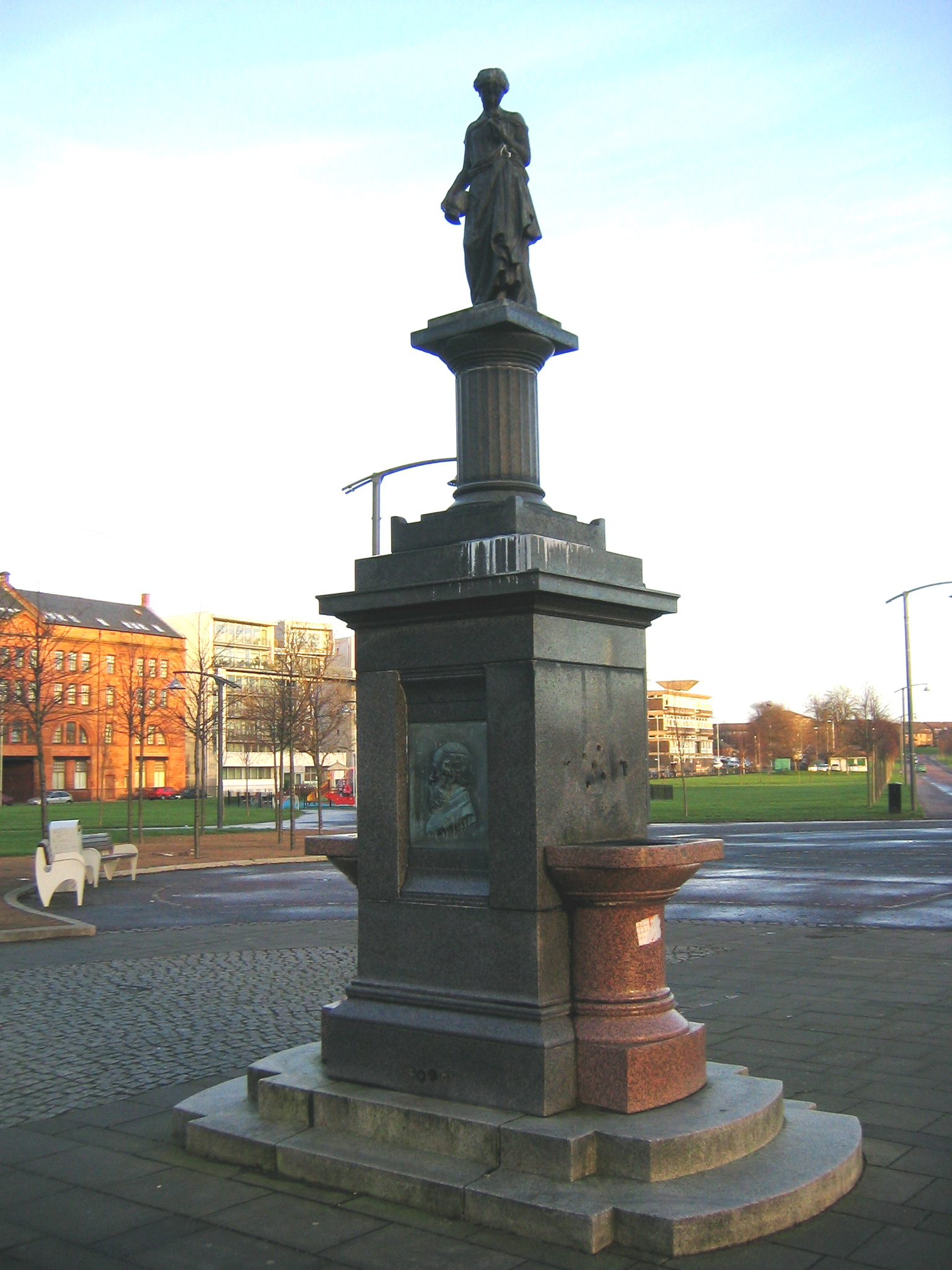
William Collins fountain in Glasgow Green. :"Erected by temperance reformers in recognition of valuable services rendered to the temperance cause by Sir William Collins, Lord Provost of the City of Glasgow 1877-1880. 29 October 1881."

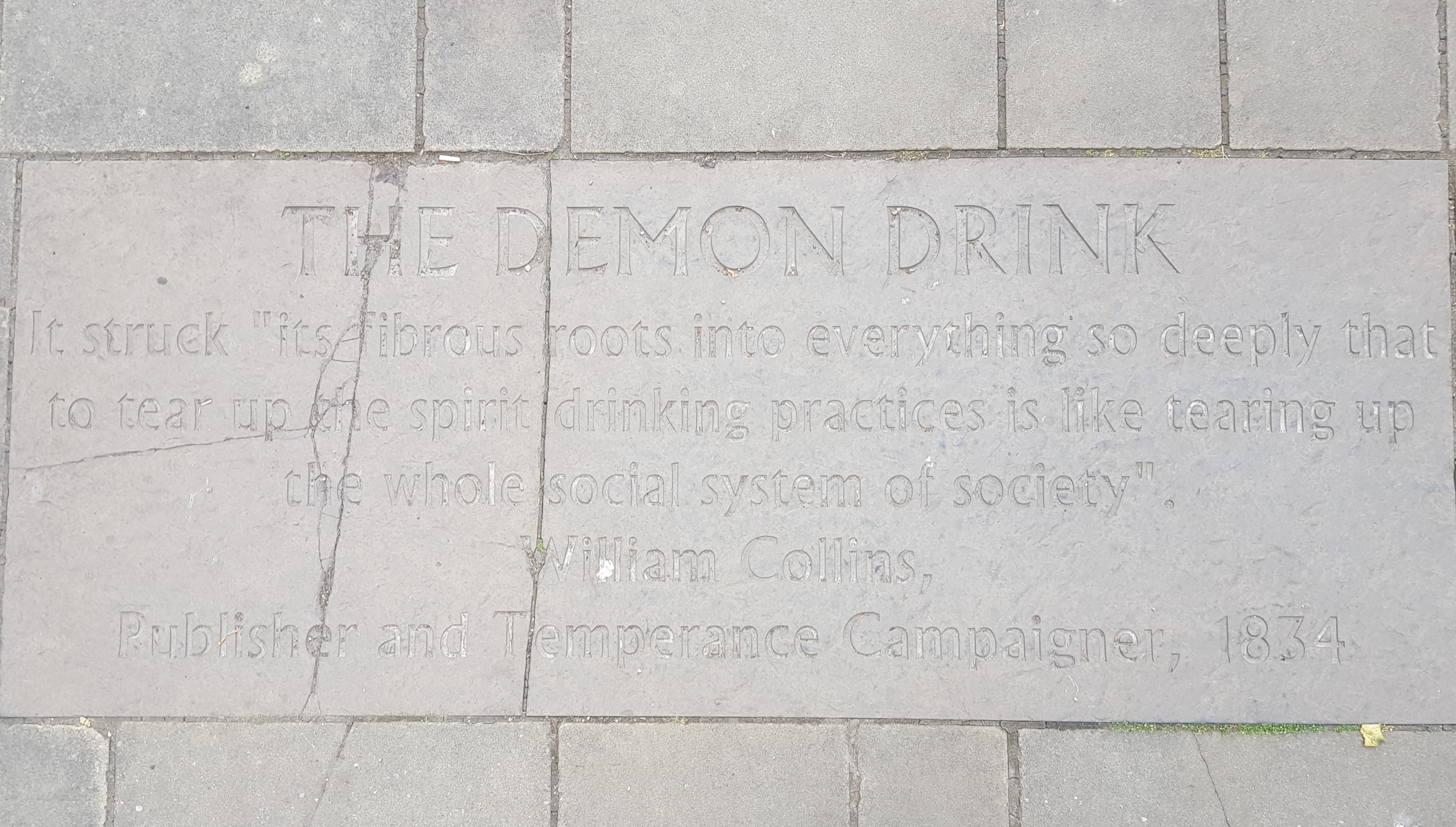
The demon drink, plaque dedicated to William Collins

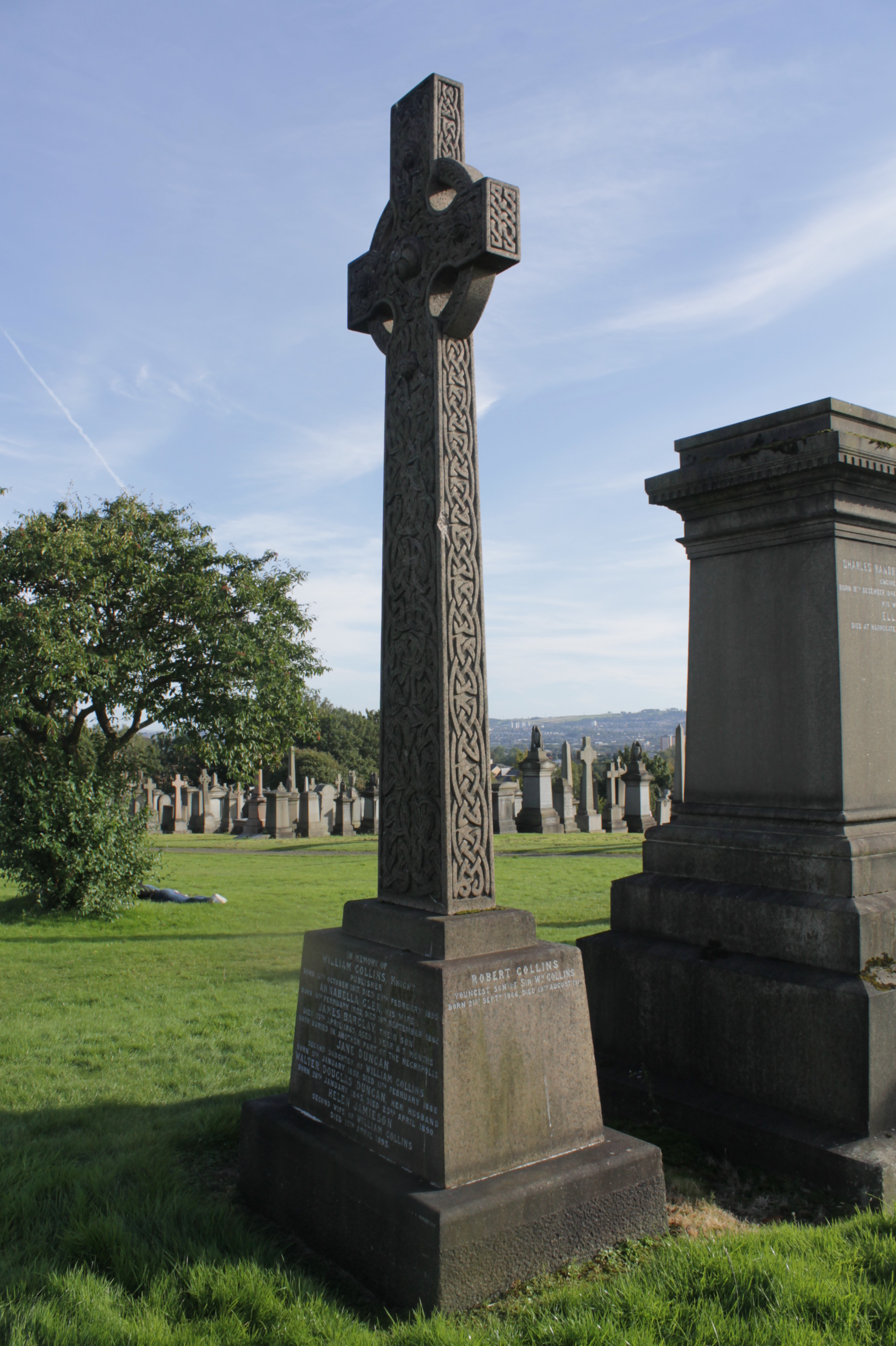
The grave of Sir William Collins, Glasgow Necropolis

Sir William Collins (1817–1895) was a Scottish publisher, prominent in the temperance movement who served as Glasgow's Lord Provost between 1877 and 1880. He was the first fully abstaining Lord Provost of Glasgow and gained the nickname Water Willie. In politics Sir William was an advanced Liberal, and in ecclesiastical matters he was an adherent of the Free Church. Collins Street in Glasgow is named after him.

== Early life and education ==
He was born in Glasgow on 12 October 1817. His father William Collins, publisher, was a highly respected citizen, well known far and wide by his affective advocacy of the temperance cause, of which he was one of the original promoters in Scotland, and also for his devoted labours in connection with the comprehensive and successful scheme for Church Extension throughout Scotland. His mother was Jane Barclay, and the family, besides William, consisted of a son and daughter, both of whom died in early life. Mr. Collins was educated in his native city and at a comparatively early age was entered as an apprentice in his father's business. In 1841 the family firm William Collins, Sons began specialising in printing Bibles. The family then lived at 113 Montrose Street. At the Disruption of 1843 both he and his father left the established Church of Scotland and joined the Free Church of Scotland.

== Partnership and business arrangements ==
When his father's publishing firm started manufacturing stationery in 1848, Collins joined as a partner. After his father's death in 1853 Collins continued the business, and in 1865 took on two of the people who had assisted managing the business as partners. Three years later his two elder sons joined as partners, and the business was then carried on under the designation of William Collins, Sons & Co., with a branch house under the same firm in London. Under this management the business continued to expand with great rapidity till 1880, when it was reconstructed in accordance with the Companies Act 1880 (43 Vict. c. 19) under the title of William Collins, Sons & Co., (Limited,) as publishers, printers, bookbinders and manufacturing stationers, and has continued its growth till it became the largest establishment of the kind outside of London. The shares were all held by Sir William and his family, and those who had been associated with him in the management. This large establishment was situated in Stirling Road, and comprised a series of substantial buildings which had also frontage in Taylor Street and St. James' Road.

== City councillor ==
Sir William entered the Council in 1868 as a representative of the fifth ward. He was four times unanimously returned by the same ward. In 1873 he was elected a Magistrate. In 1877 he was elected Lord Provost of Glasgow in place of Sir James Bain. He was succeeded in turn as Lord Provost by John Ure. At this time Collins was living at 3 Park Terrace East, a large townhouse overlooking Kelvingrove Park.

The year 1878, was one of great commercial depression, aggravated by the disastrous failure of the City of Glasgow Bank, no fewer than 30,000 persons having been for some months dependent on public charity. During that crisis Sir William's personal beneficence and public influence and exertions went a great length in mitigating distress and averting other evils that usually spring from it. He helped to form the Glasgow Liberal Association in 1878 and became involved in the Glasgow School Board (1888–1894).

== Honours ==
During his active and useful life Collins's worth and services were not unappreciated. For instance, the Incorporation of Stationers of which he had been president, presented him with an illuminated address, signed by members of the company, and enclosed in a silver gilt casket, on the occasion of his elevation to the civic chair. Again, his employees, in congratulating him on his attainment of fifty years in business, also presented him with an illuminated address, enclosed in a silver casket. Shortly after the expiry of his term of office as Lord Provost in 1880, the Corporation presented Lady Collins with a full-length portrait of Sir William, and at the same time Sir William was presented with a full-length portrait of Lady Collins, the portraits being subscribed for by members of the council and other public Trusts. Again, on 29 October of the same year, a public Fountain, designed and executed by John Mossman, and erected at the Green near the Justiciary Buildings, as a tribute from his temperance friends, was inaugurated in presence of an assemblage of 50,000 persons, considerable numbers of them being delegates from the various temperance organizations throughout the country. A. H. McLean Esq, in name of the subscribers, handed it over to the Corporation; and in accepting it Lord Provost Ure made a happy speech highly eulogistic of his predecessor in the civic chair. To cap this pile of well won honours, locally unprecedented, he the same year received the honour of knighthood at Holyrood palace, on 26 August, from Her Majesty Queen Victoria.

== Death and burial ==
He died on 20 February 1895. He is buried in the Glasgow Necropolis. The grave lies on the eastern edge of the north section of the upper plateau.

== Family ==
He was married on 24 June 1845 to Annabella Glen (1822–1862) daughter of Alexander Glen, Esq., Glasgow. She died on 12 September 1862. He married his second wife, Helen Jamieson, daughter of Robert Jamieson, Esq., Glasgow on 26 September 1865. She died in 1893.

His eldest son William (1845–1906) was also in the company. He had 11 children in all.

Civic offices
Preceded by James Bain	Lord Provost of Glasgow; 1877–1880	Succeeded by John Ure
