= David Ainsworth =

British Liberal Party politician (1842–1906)

David Ainsworth (1842 – 21 March 1906) was a British Liberal Party politician. He was first elected a Member of Parliament (MP) for the West Division of Cumberland at the 1880 general election. He had run unsuccessfully for this position in 1874. In 1885 and 1886 he ran for the Egremont constituency in Parliament, but lost. He however won the election to this constituency in 1892, but held the seat for only three years, being defeated at the 1895 general election.

His father, Thomas Ainsworth (1804–81), bought the Cleator Mills in Cleator and the nearby house called The Flosh from Henry Birley in about 1837 which was later passed to David.

In 1898, Ainsworth purchased Wray Castle, Hawkshead and this became his main seat for the last decade of his life. He had no children and Wray Castle seems to have been sold after his death.

He was President of Manchester College, Oxford (now named Harris Manchester College) from 1896 to 1900.

Ainsworth was the brother of John Stirling Ainsworth.

== Sources ==
- W. W. Bean. The Parliamentary Representation of Six Northern Counties of England. (1890) p. 15.
- Craig, F. W. S. (1989) [1977]. British parliamentary election results 1832–1885 (2nd ed.). Chichester: Parliamentary Research Services. pp. 369–370. ISBN 0-900178-26-4.
- Craig, F. W. S. (1989) [1974]. British parliamentary election results 1885–1918 (2nd ed.). Chichester: Parliamentary Research Services. p. 245. ISBN 0-900178-27-2.
- Leigh Rayment's Historical List of MPs

Parliament of the United Kingdom
Preceded by The Lord Muncaster and Percy Wyndham	Member of Parliament for Cumberland Western; 1880–1885; With: Percy Wyndham	Constituency abolished
Preceded by The Lord Muncaster	Member of Parliament for Egremont; 1892–1895	Succeeded by Hubert Duncombe
