= Viscount Selby =

Viscountcy in the Peerage of the United Kingdom

Viscountcy Selby
- Arms of the Viscount Selby Blazon Arms: Argent a lion rampant Sable between four escallops Gules on a chief of the last as many escallops Or. Crest: Between two wings erect Or an arm vested Sable cuffed Argent the hand grasping a sword erect Proper. Supporters: Dexter an owl Sable charged with a balance Or sinister an eagle Sable charged with a portcullis Or.
- Creation date: 6 July 1905
- Created by: Edward VII
- Peerage: Peerage of the United Kingdom
- First holder: The Rt.-Hon. Sir William Gully
- Present holder: Christopher Gully, 6th Viscount Selby
- Heir presumptive: The Hon. Edward Gully
- Remainder to: the 1st Viscount's heirs male of the body
- Status: Extant
- Former seats: Sutton Place, Sussex; Shuna Castle, Argyll
- Motto: NEC TEMERE NEC TARDE (Neither rashly nor slowly)

Viscount Selby, of the City of Carlisle, is a title in the Peerage of the United Kingdom. It was created in 1905 for the Liberal politician Sir William Court Gully upon his retirement as Speaker of the House of Commons. The family seat was Shuna Castle in Argyll.

The first Viscount was the son of the prominent physician James Manby Gully. The title of the viscountcy derived from the maiden name of Gully's wife, Elizabeth Selby, daughter of Thomas Selby, of Ightham Mote, Kent. His seat was at Sutton Place, Seaford, Sussex.

At present the family seat is Ardfern House, near Lochgilphead, Argyll.

== Viscounts Selby (1905) ==
- William Court Gully, 1st Viscount Selby (1835–1909)
- James William Herschell Gully, 2nd Viscount Selby (1867–1923)
- Thomas Sutton Evelyn Gully, 3rd Viscount Selby (1911–1959)
- Michael Guy John Gully, 4th Viscount Selby (1942–1997)
- Edward Thomas William Gully, 5th Viscount Selby (1967–2001)
- Christopher Rolf Thomas Gully, 6th Viscount Selby (b. 1993)

The heir presumptive is the present holder's great-uncle The Hon. James Edward Hugh Grey Gully (b. 1945).
The heir presumptive's heir apparent is his eldest son James Ian Mackenzie Gully (b. 1975)
