= Model Parliament =

Parliament of England

The Model Parliament was the 1295 Parliament of England of King Edward I. Its composition became the model for later parliaments.

== History ==
The term Model Parliament was coined by William Stubbs (1825–1901) and later used also by Frederic William Maitland. The assembly of AD 1295 included members of the clergy and the aristocracy, as well as representatives from the various counties and boroughs. Each county returned two knights, each borough elected two burgesses, and each city provided two citizens. That composition became the model for later parliaments, hence the name.

A similar scheme had been used in summoning Simon de Montfort's Parliament in 1265, but it had been called by Simon de Montfort in the midst of the Second Barons' War against Henry III of England. The same scheme was remarkably adopted by a king who was Henry's son and heir although he had quelled Montfort's uprising.

Edward I summoned the parliament to meet at Westminster on 13 November 1295. In calling the parliament, Edward proclaimed in his writ of summons that "what touches all, should be approved of all, and it is also clear that common dangers should be met by measures agreed upon in common".

Parliament's legislative authority was then limited, and its primary role was to levy taxes. Edward's paramount goal in summoning the parliament was to raise funds for his wars, specifically the planned campaigns against the French and the Scots for the forthcoming year and countering an insurgency in Wales. That "sound finance" by taxation was a goal of summoning the parliament but was tied into "counsel" to the king and "the element of service" for feudalism.

However, the resulting parliament became a model for a new function as well, the addressing of grievances with the king. "The elected members were far more anxious to establish the second function: to discuss grievances. A kind of quid pro quo was looked for: money for the Scottish campaign of 1296 would be forthcoming if certain grievances were addressed. This consciousness was growing, even if all was still in an embryonic state". The concept of "Parliament" was in fact such that the division into House of Commons and House of Lords had not yet taken place. The Model Parliament was unicameral and summoned 49 lords to sit with 292 representatives of the Commons.

The Model Parliament created a precedent in which each "successor of a baron" (which includes Lords Spiritual) who had received a writ to the parliament of 1295 "had a legal right to receive a writ". However, this strictly hereditary right was not recognized formally until 1387.

== See also ==
- Parliament of England
- Provisions of Oxford and Provisions of Westminster
- List of parliaments of England
- List of MPs elected to the English parliament in 1295
