= Hugh Fullerton (politician) =

British Liberal Party politician

Hugh Fullerton

Hugh Fullerton (c. 1851 – 31 August 1922) was a radical British Liberal Party politician and merchant.

== Background ==
He was a son of Samuel and Mary Fullerton, of Manchester. He was educated at public schools. He married in 1891, Ada Copley, daughter of Joseph Copley.

== Career ==
He was a working man, then foreman, then master. He was a Justice of the Peace and Magistrate, first in the City of Manchester and then in Cumberland. He took an active part in various educational, social, and political movements. In local politics he was a member of the Liberal backed Progressive Party. He was Chairman of the School Board, Manchester. He had been a Guardian of the Poor. He was a member of a Trades Council. He was Executive Treasurer, Discharged Prisoners’ Aid Society, Manchester. He was a Member of the Executive for seven years of the National Liberal Federation. He had made an inauspicious start to his parliamentary career when he was chosen as the Liberal candidate for Ashton-under-Lyne, near his native Manchester. However, by the time a General Election came along in 1900, he had been replaced as candidate, with a suggestion that he lacked the financial means to serve as an MP. Six years later, he was elected to parliament, at the first attempt, at the 1906 General Election, gaining Egremont from the Conservatives.

General election 1906 Egremont Electorate 9,093
| Party | Candidate | Votes | % | ±% |
|---|---|---|---|---|
| Liberal | Hugh Fullerton | 4,067 | 55.5 | +9.2 |
| Conservative | E.J.M. Lumb | 3,255 | 44.5 | −9.2 |
| Majority | | 812 | 11.0 | 18.4 |
| Turnout | | | 80.5 | +2.1 |
| Liberal gain from Conservative | | Swing | +9.2 | |

He sat as Liberal MP for Egremont, Cumberland from 1906–January 1910. He served one term as he was defeated by the Conservatives at the January 1910 General Election. He did not contest the December 1910 General Election but made an attempt to return to parliament at the 1918 General Election when he stood for the Liberal Party as their candidate at Royton in Lancashire. The Coalition Government 'coupon' was awarded to his Unionist opponent and he finished third.

General election 1918 Electorate 35,239
| Party | Candidate | Votes | % | ±% |
|---|---|---|---|---|
| Unionist | Wilfrid Hart Sugden | 12,434 | | |
| Labour | James Crinion | 4,875 | | |
| Liberal | Hugh Fullerton | 4,451 | | |
| Majority | | | | |
| Turnout | | | | |
| Unionist win | | | | |

He did not stand for parliament again.

== Sources ==
- Who Was Who
- British parliamentary election results 1885-1918, Craig, F. W. S.; Macmillan; ISBN 0333169034

Parliament of the United Kingdom
| Preceded by James Robert Bain | Member of Parliament for Egremont; 1906–January 1910 | Succeeded by James Augustus Grant |
