= Thomas Richardson (Labour politician) =

British politician (1868–1928)

Thomas Richardson (6 June 1868 – 22 October 1928) was a Labour Party politician in the United Kingdom who served as member of parliament (MP) for Whitehaven, in Cumberland, from 1910 to 1918.

Thomas Richardson was the first born of Robert Richardson and his wife Margaret and was named for his grandfather who died shortly before he was born. His father worked as a coal miner and the family had lived at Usworth Colliery. Thomas began working as a coal miner as well. In 1885 his father died in an explosion in the Usworth pit which had claimed forty one other men. At the age of 20 Thomas Richardson married his wife Mary Ellinor Purvis. They had ten children. He interest in politics was motivated by his desire to improve conditions for coal miners.

Richardson was an active member of the Independent Labour Party, and its leading member in Whitehaven. His brother William was also active in the party, and later became Treasurer of the Miners' Federation of Great Britain.

He was elected as Whitehaven's first Labour MP at the December 1910 general election. A Labour candidate had stood unsuccessfully in January 1910 general election, but Richardson was assisted by the absence of a Liberal party candidate.

At the 1918 election, he did not stand again in Whitehaven, but stood in Bosworth in Leicestershire, where he was not elected, winning only 33% of the vote in a two-way contest.

Parliament of the United Kingdom
Preceded by John Arthur Jackson	Member of Parliament for Whitehaven; Dec. 1910 – 1918	Succeeded by James Augustus Grant
Party political offices
Preceded by New position	North East Division representative on the Independent Labour Party National Administrative Council; 1906–1907	Succeeded by William Wood
