= Thomas Gavan-Duffy =

Irish politician (1867–1932)

Thomas Gavan-Duffy (25 September 1867 – 4 August 1932) was an Irish trade unionist and politician. He served as the member of parliament (MP) for Whitehaven from 1922 to 1924.

Born in Dublin, Gavan-Duffy was educated by the Christian Brothers there and became a district delegate for the Shop Assistants' Union. For 23 years he was general secretary of the Cumberland Iron Ore Miners' Association.

He unsuccessfully contested the Whitehaven constituency in 1918, won it in 1922, and lost it again in 1924.

Parliament of the United Kingdom
Preceded by James Augustus Grant	Member of Parliament for Whitehaven; 1922 – 1924	Succeeded by Robert Hudson
Trade union offices
Preceded by James Flynn	General Secretary of the Cumberland Iron Ore Miners' and Kindred Trades' Association; 1907–1929	Office abolished
