= John Arthur Jackson =

John Arthur Jackson (30 November 1862 – 25 November 1937) was a businessman and a British Conservative Party politician from Cumberland.

Jackson was educated at St Peter's, York.

His business career included a senior partnership with Timber Merchants J. & W. Jackson, chairmanship of the Whitehaven Colliery Company and a directorship with the Furness Railway Company.

He was elected at the general election in January 1910 as Member of Parliament (MP) for Whitehaven, but lost his seat at the December 1910 election.

== Personal ==
He was the second recorded son of John Jackson of Hensingham House in Cumberland. In 1892 he married the fourth daughter of James Marshall Hill of Greenock: the couple had a daughter.

Parliament of the United Kingdom
Preceded by William Burnyeat	Member of Parliament for Whitehaven; January 1910 – December 1910	Succeeded by Thomas Richardson
