= Thomas Shepherd Little =

Thomas Shepherd Little (1845 – 28 June 1910) was a British-Irish barrister and politician.

Born in Kilkenny, Little was educated at Trinity College, Cambridge, where he won a scholarship in international law and took first-class honours in the Law and History tripos of 1872. He was called to the English bar by Inner Temple in 1874 and joined the Northern Circuit, on which he practiced thirty-three years. He was the editor of the English law section of Donald Mackenzie's work on Roman law.

One of the few Ulster Protestants to support William Ewart Gladstone, at the 1892 general election, Little was elected for the Liberal Party in Whitehaven, serving until his defeat in the 1895 general election. Having acted for some time as deputy recorder for Liverpool, from 1908 until his death, he served as a stipendiary magistrate for Liverpool.
