= Egremont (constituency) =

Parliamentary constituency in the United Kingdom, 1885–1918

- Former county constituency for the House of Commons

1885–1918
- Seats: one
- Created from: West Cumberland
- Replaced by: Whitehaven

1295–1295
- Created from: Cumberland
- Replaced by: Cumberland

Egremont was a parliamentary constituency centred on the town of Egremont in Cumberland. It returned one Member of Parliament (MP) to the House of Commons of England in 1295 and to the House of Commons of the Parliament of the United Kingdom, elected by the first past the post system.

== Boundaries ==
This county constituency was a division of the historic county of Cumberland in North West England. Although the area had an alternative designation of the Western division of the county, it was actually the southernmost constituency in the county, with the sea to the south and west and the boundaries with the historic counties of Lancashire and Westmorland to the east. The Cumberland divisions of Cockermouth and Penrith were to the north.

The borough constituency of Whitehaven was, apart from the sea to its west, enclaved in the north west part of this constituency. Non resident freeholders from the town were qualified to vote in the county seat. In 1918 the Whitehaven borough constituency and the Egremont county division were, in effect, merged to form a new Whitehaven county constituency.

== History ==
Egremont was represented as a two-member constituency, in the Model Parliament of 1295. The town was subsequently represented only as part of the county of Cumberland.

From 1832 until 1885 the historic county of Cumberland was split for parliamentary purposes into two county divisions. These were East Cumberland (with a place of election, in the part of the period when all votes were still cast in one location in a constituency, at Carlisle) and West Cumberland (where voting took place at Cockermouth). Each division returned two members to Parliament.

The parliamentary borough included in the area of the county divisions (whose non-resident 40 shilling freeholders voted in the county constituency) were for the East division; Carlisle and for the West division; Cockermouth and Whitehaven. (Source: Stooks Smith).

The constituency was created by the Redistribution of Seats Act 1885 for the 1885 general election, and abolished for the 1918 general election. The division was named after the small town of Egremont.

It was an area with a mixed economy. Ironstone mining and a blast furnace employed many people and there were some inhabitants engaged in shipbuilding. It was estimated that in the late nineteenth century, 1 in 11 of the adult male population of Cumberland worked in mining and 1 in 5 in heavy industry. There were also a lot of small freehold farmers in the more rural parts of the constituency, who were thought to be the source of Conservative strength at elections.

The area usually returned Conservative Members of Parliament, but was prepared to elect a Liberal in a good year for that party. Pelling suggests that the substantial Irish element in the divisions population (who had arrived to work as labourers as the county industrialised in the 1860s) were responsible for Liberal victories, at elections when Irish Nationalists were strongly supporting the Liberals. In any event the Conservatives won six and the Liberals two of the seats eight general elections.

== Members of Parliament ==
Election	Member	Party
1295	Willielmus de Gylling; Alexander, fil' Ricardi	
1885	Jocelyn Pennington ^{a}	Conservative
1892	David Ainsworth	Liberal
1895	Hubert Duncombe	Conservative
1900	James Bain	Conservative
1906	Hugh Fullerton	Liberal
1910	James Augustus Grant	Conservative
1918	constituency abolished	

Note:-

- ^{a} Peer of Ireland when a member of the House of Commons.

== Elections ==
=== Elections in the 1880s ===
General election 1885: Egremont
Party	Candidate	Votes	%	±%
Conservative	Josslyn Pennington	3,990	53.6	
Liberal	David Ainsworth	3,453	46.4	
Majority		537	7.2	
Turnout		7,443	82.3	
Registered electors		9,043		
Conservative win (new seat)				

General election 1886: Egremont
Party	Candidate	Votes	%	±%
Conservative	Josslyn Pennington	3,583	51.2	−2.4
Liberal	David Ainsworth	3,419	48.8	+2.4
Majority		164	2.4	−4.8
Turnout		7,002	77.4	−4.9
Registered electors		9,043		
Conservative hold		Swing	-2.4	

=== Elections in the 1890s ===
General election 1892: Egremont
Party	Candidate	Votes	%	±%
Liberal	David Ainsworth	3,849	53.3	+4.5
Conservative	Josslyn Pennington	3,378	46.7	−4.5
Majority		471	6.6	N/A
Turnout		7,227	78.5	+1.1
Registered electors		9,205		
Liberal gain from Conservative		Swing	+4.5	

General election 1895: Egremont
Party	Candidate	Votes	%	±%
Conservative	Hubert Duncombe	3,717	50.9	+4.2
Liberal	David Ainsworth	3,586	49.1	−4.2
Majority		131	1.8	N/A
Turnout		7,303	70.1	−8.4
Registered electors		10,424		
Conservative gain from Liberal		Swing	+4.2	

=== Elections in the 1900s ===
General election 1900: Egremont
Party	Candidate	Votes	%	±%
Conservative	James Bain	3,917	53.7	+2.8
Liberal	David Ainsworth	3,377	46.3	−2.8
Majority		540	7.4	+5.6
Turnout		7,294	78.4	+8.3
Registered electors		9,303		
Conservative hold		Swing	+2.8	

Hugh Fullerton

General election 1906: Egremont
Party	Candidate	Votes	%	±%
Liberal	Hugh Fullerton	4,067	55.5	+9.2
Conservative	E.J.M. Lumb	3,255	44.5	−9.2
Majority		812	11.0	N/A
Turnout		7,322	80.5	+2.1
Registered electors		9,093		
Liberal gain from Conservative		Swing	+9.2	

=== Elections in the 1910s ===
General election January 1910: Egremont
Party	Candidate	Votes	%	±%
Conservative	James Grant	4,060	50.7	+6.2
Liberal	Hugh Fullerton	3,949	49.3	−6.2
Majority		111	1.4	N/A
Turnout		8,009	87.1	+6.6
Registered electors		9,199		
Conservative gain from Liberal		Swing	+6.2	

General election December 1910: Egremont
Party	Candidate	Votes	%	±%
Conservative	James Grant	4,013	51.6	+0.9
Liberal	William Edward Moulsdale	3,763	48.4	−0.9
Majority		250	3.2	+1.8
Turnout		7,776	84.5	−2.6
Registered electors		9,199		
Conservative hold		Swing	+0.9	

General Election 1914–15:

Another General Election was required to take place before the end of 1915. The political parties had been making preparations for an election to take place and by July 1914, the following candidates had been selected;

- Unionist: James Grant
- Liberal:

== See also ==
- Parliamentary franchise in the United Kingdom 1885–1918
