= Cumberland County Council, England =

Local government body in Cumberland, England

Cumberland County Council
- Coat of arms

History
- Founded: 1 April 1889
- Disbanded: 31 March 1974
- Succeeded by: Cumbria County Council

Meeting place
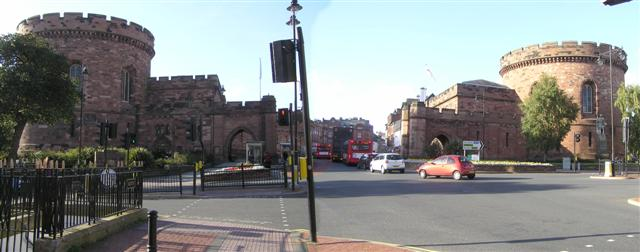
- The Courts, Carlisle

Cumberland County Council was the county council of Cumberland in the North West of England, an elected local government body responsible for most local services in the county. It was established in 1889 as a result of the Local Government Act 1888. Carlisle was initially within its area but became a separate county borough in 1914. In 1974, both authorities were merged along with parts of others into the new Cumbria County Council. In April 2023 local government in Cumbria was reorganised into two unitary authorities, one of which is named Cumberland Council and includes most of the historic county, with the exception of Penrith and the surrounding area.

== History ==
County councils were first introduced in England and Wales with full powers from 22 September 1889 as a result of the Local Government Act 1888, taking over administrative functions until then carried out by the unelected quarter sessions. The areas they covered were termed administrative counties and were not in all cases identical to the ancient counties, but in Cumberland the whole county initially came under the authority of the council.

The first elections to the new county council were held in January 1889. Following them, James Lowther asked a question in the House of Commons about the alleged refusal of the county council to make regulations for the inspection of marked registers.

The new system of local democracy was a significant development and reflected the increasing range of functions carried out by local government in late Victorian Britain. Schools (both primary and secondary) were added to the County Council's responsibilities in 1902.

Throughout its existence, Cumberland County Council was responsible for the more strategic local services of Cumberland. By the time it was merged into Cumbria, it provided a wide range of services, including education (schools, libraries and youth services), social services, highway maintenance, waste disposal, emergency planning, consumer protection and town and country planning for matters to do with minerals, waste, highways and education. This made it a substantial employer.

There was a changing pattern of lower-tier authorities existing alongside the county and responsible for other more local services. The Local Government Act 1894 (56 & 57 Vict. c. 73) reconstituted the existing sanitary districts as urban districts and rural districts, each with an elected council. The Local Government Act 1929 forced county councils to review the districts within their areas to form more efficient units of local government. In Cumberland, where a review was carried out in 1934, this meant merging the districts.

== Position of Carlisle ==
The Local Government Act 1888 allowed any municipal borough with a population of 50,000 to become a county borough, taking over all of the functions of the county council. In 1914, Carlisle gained this status and left the administrative county, while remaining within the geographic county of Cumberland for the purposes of the lieutenancy and the shrievalty.

== Abolition in 1974 ==
In 1974, under the Local Government Act 1972, both the administrative county of Cumberland and the county borough of Carlisle were abolished. The areas they covered were combined with Westmorland, part of Lancashire and part of the West Riding of Yorkshire to form a new non-metropolitan county called Cumbria. The Cumberland area was divided at the district tier into the City of Carlisle, Allerdale, Copeland and part of Eden.

The council's final major road scheme, an A66 bypass for Keswick, was prepared by Scott Wilson Kirkpatrick, consulting engineers, in 1972, and construction began in the summer of 1974, with the new Cumbria authority completing the scheme.

== Elections ==
From 1889 to 1969, members were elected for a three-year term of office, later a four-year term, with elections held all together on the "first past the post" system. All of the county's electoral divisions elected a single member, and the elected members chose aldermen, whose term of office was for six years, who were additional voting members of the authority.

=== 1889 ===
The first election was held on Friday 18 January 1889. There were 60 councillors to be elected. However, in 22 divisions there was no contest so the candidates were elected unopposed. Due to an error by the Local Government Board the election for one division was not able to be held until a later date. Following the first meeting and the election by the council of aldermen, 79 of the 80 seats were filled with the following party allegiances: 37 Liberals, 33 Conservatives and 9 Liberal Unionists. The Liberals won all the seats in West Cumberland, and it was seen as an advance for the party: it was estimated that there were no more than 20 or 30 supporters of Liberalism among the 180 county magistrates from whom the county council was acquiring its powers. Temperance candidates, who contested a large number of divisions, failed to win any seats. The Times noted the following as the occupations of those elected: 23 landowners, 13 yeomen and tenant farmers, 14 people employed in "commerce", 13 in the mining industry, 1 in shipping and 15 "professional men or men who had retired from commercial life".

=== 1892 ===
The second election was held on Friday 4 March 1892. Of the 60 seats only 22 were contested with 38 members returned unopposed. There was very little change with only 4 sitting members of the council defeated. Labour candidates stood in 5 divisions without success and the political affiliation of the 60 councillors elected was Conservative 29, Liberal 27 and Liberal Unionist 4. The 10 aldermanic vacancies were filled at the first meeting following the election with 8 Conservatives and 2 Liberals chosen.

=== 1970 ===
The final election to the Cumberland County Council was held on Thursday, 9 April 1970. The make-up of the council following the election was as follows: Independents 27, Labour 21, Conservatives 11, Liberals 2, representing a net gain of 2 seats to Labour at the expense of Independents.

== Notable members ==
- Sir Frederick William Chance, also a member of parliament
- Rev. Hardwicke Rawnsley (elected 1889)
- Ambrose Callighan (elected 1921)
- Sir John Scurrah Randles
- Tim Westoll, chairman, 1959 to 1974, and also first chairman of Cumbria County Council

== See also ==
- Lord Lieutenant of Cumberland
- High Sheriff of Cumberland
- County council

New creation	County council 1889 – 1974	Succeeded by Cumbria County Council
