= Joseph Symonds =

Joseph Bede Symonds OBE (17 January 1900 – 29 March 1985) was a Labour Party politician in the United Kingdom. He was the member of parliament (MP) for the Whitehaven constituency in Cumberland from 1959 until he stood down at the 1970 general election for health reasons. He was an organiser of the Jarrow March and the first signatory of the petition handed to Parliament.

One of 21 children, Symonds served with The Black Watch (Royal Highland Regiment) in India, reaching the rank of sergeant major. He married Mary Lavinia Harrison with whom he had 13 children. From 1946 onwards the family lived at Hedworth View in a three-bedroomed council house.

As well his elected status, Symonds held many other offices during his lifetime, including Councillor and Mayor of Jarrow, and Chair of the National Housing Committee. He was appointed an Officer of the Order of the British Empire in the 1957 New Year Honours for services to the disabled and was a strong influence in the building of the Tyne Tunnel crossing in preference to a bridge, the construction of which would have required the demolition of many good quality council houses.

Parliament of the United Kingdom
Preceded by Frank Anderson	Member of Parliament for Whitehaven; 1959–1970	Succeeded by Jack Cunningham
