= Frank Anderson (politician) =

British politician (1889–1959)

Frank Anderson (21 November 1889 – 25 April 1959) was a Labour Party politician in the United Kingdom.

Born in Bury, Anderson became a railway clerk. He joined the Labour Party, and stood unsuccessfully in High Peak at the 1922 and 1923 United Kingdom general elections, and in Stretford at the 1929 and 1931 United Kingdom general elections. He was finally elected in Whitehaven in 1935, serving until his death, aged 69, in 1959.

Parliament of the United Kingdom
Preceded by William Nunn	Member of Parliament for Whitehaven; 1935–1959	Succeeded by Joseph Symonds
