= John Ure (Lord Provost) =

Scottish merchant from 1880 to 1883

John Ure DL LLD (1824–1901) was a Scottish merchant who served as Lord Provost of Glasgow from 1880 to 1883.

== Life ==
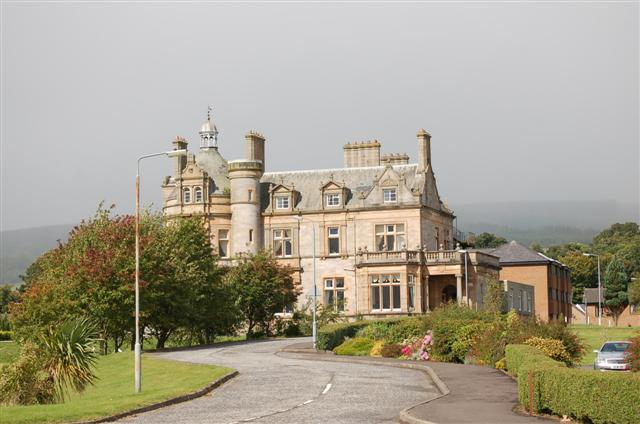
Cairndhu House in Helensburgh

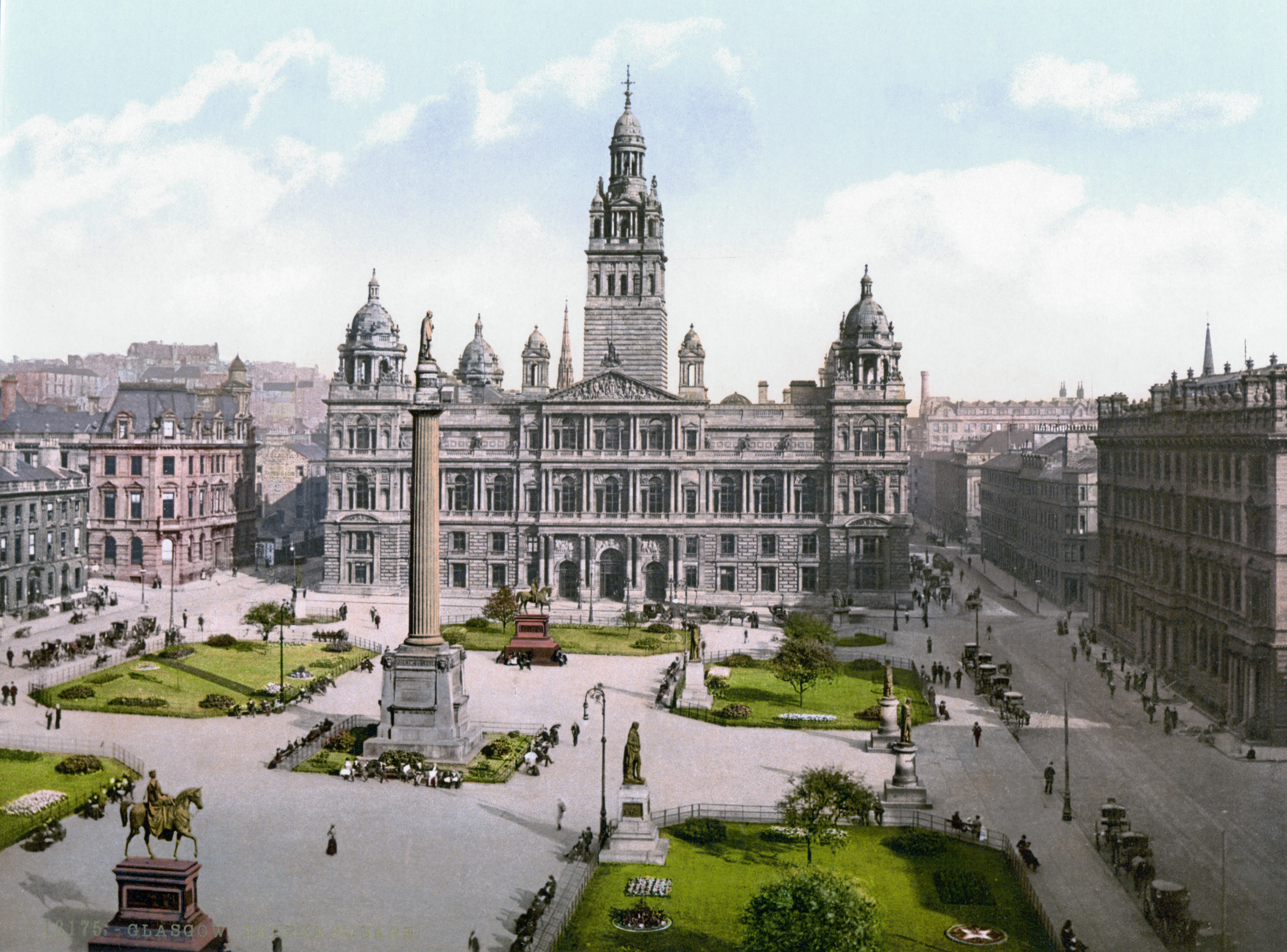
Glasgow Municipal Buildings, George Square

He was born on 17 July 1824, the son of John Ure, a baker. The family lived at 80 Bridgegate, then a fashionable quarter.

At the age of eight, he nearly drowned in the River Clyde. He joined the family baking business in 1837 and from the mid-1840s expanded it greatly.

He became a town councillor in 1856 and became chairman of the Sanitary Department in Glasgow in 1858, appointing Glasgow's first Medical Officer of Health, William Tennant Gairdner.

In 1865, he built the large Crown Flour Mills on Washington Street. This was done to supply his existing large bakery firm with cheaper flour.

For most of his later life he lived in Helensburgh in a house commissioned from architect William Leiper in 1871. The house, "Cairndhu", was designed to look like a French chateau and contained stained glass by Daniel Cottier.

In 1880, he succeeded Sir William Collins as Lord Provost of Glasgow. During his term in office, he organised the building of the new Council buildings on George Square. On stepping down as Lord Provost he declined a knighthood from Queen Victoria, the standard "reward" for a Lord Provost, the only Lord Provost to do this in her reign.

In 1884, he became Deputy Chairman of the Clyde Navigation Trust. From 1889 to 1891, he was Lord Dean of Guild for Glasgow. He was Chairman of the Glasgow Savings Bank.

He died at "Cairndhu" on 1 August 1901. He is buried in Helensburgh Cemetery.

== Family ==
He was married to Isabella Gibb. Their children included the politician Alexander Ure, 1st Baron Strathclyde. His three other sons ran the family bakery and flour business.

His sister Annie Ure, married the merchant-baker William Primrose, and his nephew (their son) was John Ure Primrose, who was named after him, and served as Lord Provost of Glasgow from 1902 to 1905.

His great grand-daughter was the actress Mary Ure.

== Artistic recognition ==
Whilst in office as Lord Provost he was portrayed by the then young George Reid RSA, one of his earliest commissions.
