= Nina H. Kennard =

Irish author

Annie "Nina" née Homan-Mulock Kennard (1844 - 1926) was an author. She married Arthur Challis Kennard, an ironmaster, in 1866.

Her works include biographies of Mrs. Siddons, the Shakespearean actress Sarah Siddons, another on journalist and author Lafcadio Hearn and Rachel, concerning the French actor Elisa Rachel Felix, for John H. Ingram's Eminent Women series.

She wrote the novel Helene.
