= William Court Gully, 1st Viscount Selby =

British politician (1835–1909)

The Right Honourable The Viscount Selby PC KC
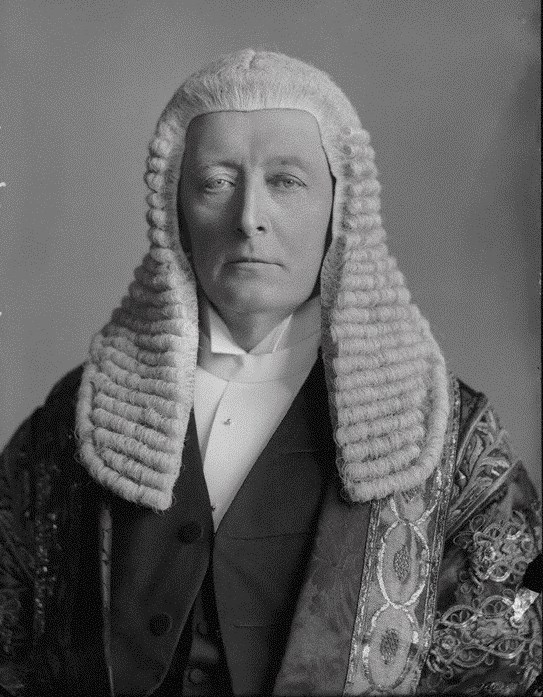
- Gully in 1895

Speaker of the House of Commons of the United Kingdom
- In office 10 April 1895 – 8 June 1905
- Monarchs: Victoria; Edward VII
- Prime Minister: Archibald Primrose; Robert Gascoyne-Cecil; Arthur Balfour
- Preceded by: Sir Arthur Peel
- Succeeded by: Sir James Lowther

Personal details
- Born: 29 August 1835
- Died: 6 November 1909 (aged 74)
- Party: Liberal
- Spouse: Elizabeth Selby (died 1906)
- Education: Trinity College, Cambridge

William Court Gully, 1st Viscount Selby PC, KC (29 August 1835 – 6 November 1909) was a British lawyer and Liberal politician. He served as Speaker of the House of Commons between 1895 and 1905.

== Background and education ==
Gully was the son of James Manby Gully of Malvern, a successful physician who became involved in the mysterious death of Charles Bravo in April 1876. His grandfather was Daniel Gully, a Jamaican coffee planter. He was educated at University College School, London and then Trinity College, Cambridge, where he was president of the Union. He was called to the bar by the Inner Temple in 1860, went the northern circuit, and took silk in 1877.

== Political career ==
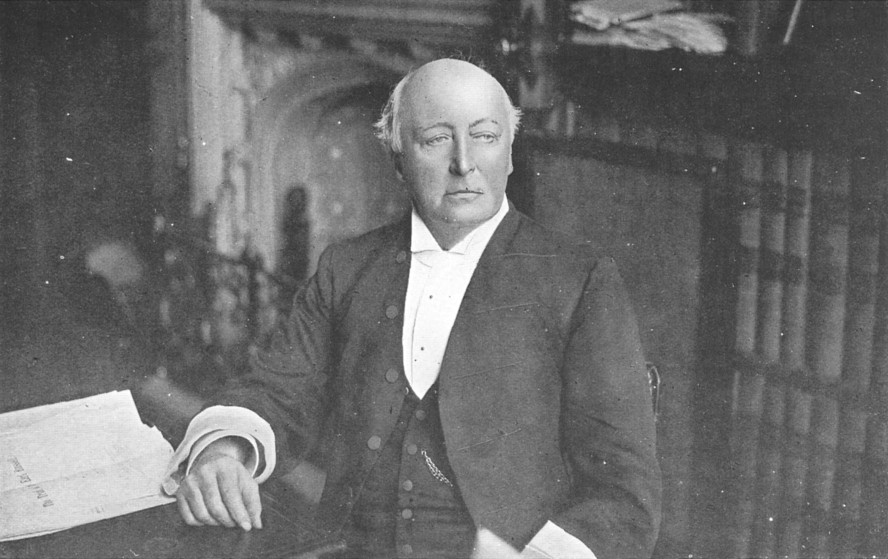
Gully in the Speaker's rooms, 1905

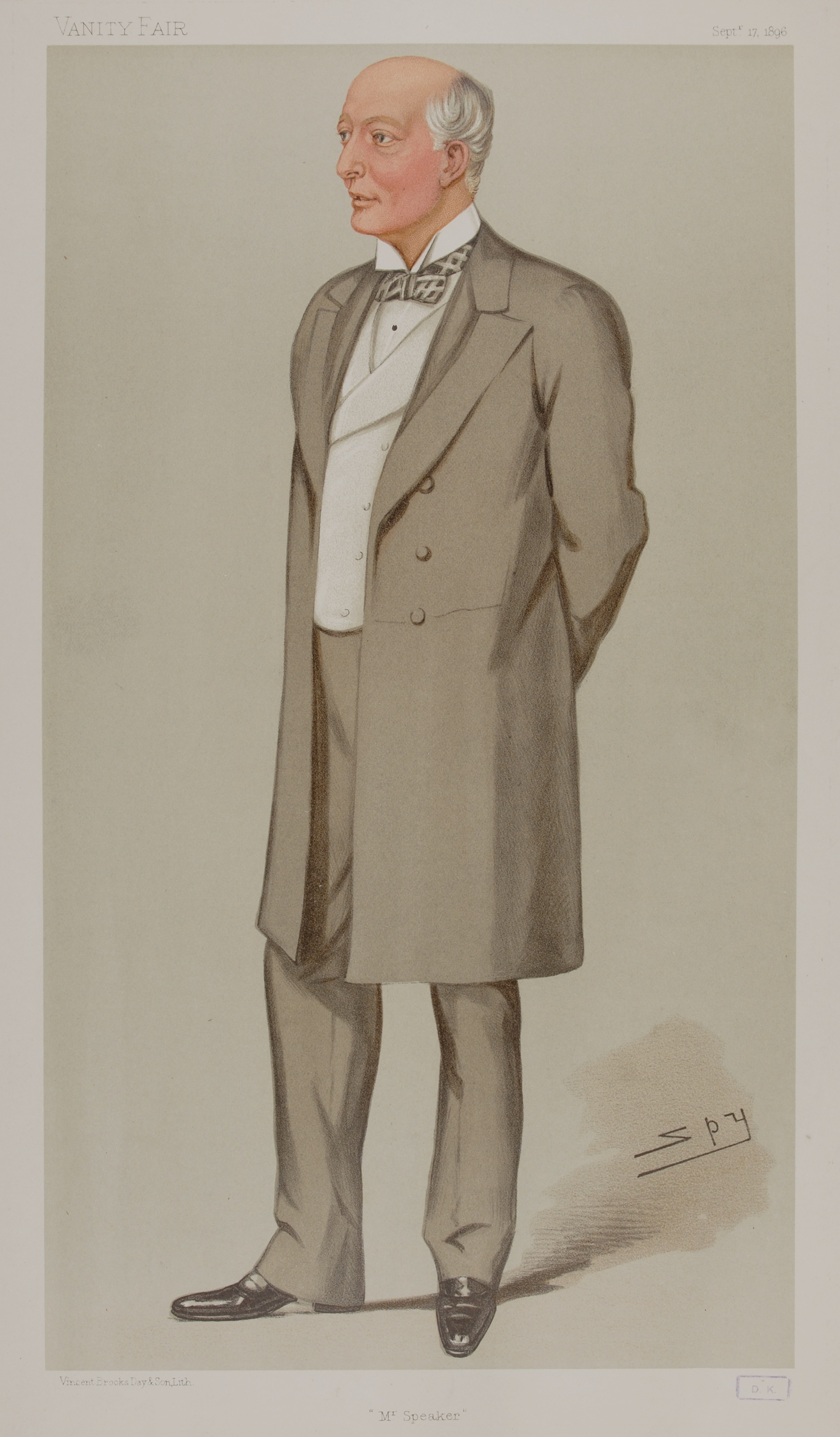
"Mr Speaker" as caricatured by Spy (Leslie Ward) in Vanity Fair, September 1896

In 1880 and 1883 Gully unsuccessfully contested Whitehaven as a Liberal, but was elected for Carlisle in 1886, and continued to represent that constituency until his elevation to the peerage. In April 1895 he was elected Speaker by a majority of eleven votes over Sir Matthew White Ridley, the Unionist nominee. The choice of Gully was a surprise to Lord Rosebery's cabinet. Rosebery did not want a Unionist as the new Speaker of the House of Commons, but rejected the two alternatives of Richard Haldane and Sir Frank Lockwood. Rosebery faced hostility in his cabinet from Sir William Vernon Harcourt and from the opposition, and Harcourt wanted the Liberal Unionist Leonard Courtney as Speaker. Harcourt viewed this as purely a matter for the House of Commons (Rosebery being in the House of Lords). To Rosebery it became a minor cabinet crisis. Finally in disgust Harcourt placed the onus of the decision on Rosebery. Eventually the backbenchers of the Commons who knew Gully propelled him - most likely because he was close to Sir William Herschell. Harcourt was forced to produce the name to the House of Commons. The Conservatives were not happy about his selection, and (recalling the scandal that engulfed his father) would greet his appearance in the House with cries of "Bravo, Gully!". In 1905 he resigned and was raised to the peerage with the title of Viscount Selby, of the City of Carlisle, the name being that of his wife (see below).

He died in November 1909, aged 74, and was succeeded by his son, James.

== Family ==
Lord Selby married, in 1865, Elizabeth Selby (died 1906), daughter of Thomas Selby. Elizabeth Gully played an important role supporting her husband as political hostess in Speaker's House, and as patron of the Ladies' Gallery in the House of Commons.

They had six children:

- James William Herschell Gully, 2nd Viscount Selby (1867–1923), who married Ada Pirier. They divorced in 1909 and he married Dorothy Grey.
- Hon. Edward Walford Karslake Gully, CB (1870–1931), who married 1901 Ada Symon. Edward acted as Private Secretary to his father, and to the next Speaker of the House of Commons James Lowther.
- Hon. Gertrude Anne Gully (died 1949), who married 1888 His Honour James Aloysius Scully, Judge of Brighton District Court.
- Hon. Florence Julia Gully (died 1949), who married 1892 Sir William Guy Granet.
- Hon. Mary Honorah Rhoda Gully (died 1961), who married 1894 Sir Adrian Donald Wilde Pollock (1867–1943).
- Hon. Elizabeth Kate Shelley Gully (died 1908), known as Shelley, who married first 1902 Captain Carleton Salkeld, and after his marriage was annulled, secondly Hon. Edward Brabazon Meade in 1907.

== Arms ==
Coat of arms of William Court Gully, 1st Viscount Selby
Coronet A Coronet of a Viscount Crest Between two wings erect Or an arm vested Sable cuffed Argent the hand grasping a sword erect Proper. Escutcheon Argent a lion rampant Sable between four escallops Gules on a chief of the last as many escallops Or. Supporters Dexter an owl Sable charged with a balance Or sinister an eagle Sable charged with a portcullis Or. Motto NEC TEMERE NEC TARDE (Neither Rashly Nor Slowly)

== Notes ==
Parliament of the United Kingdom
Preceded by Robert Ferguson	Member of Parliament for Carlisle; 1886 – 1905	Succeeded by Frederick Chance
Preceded by Sir Arthur Peel	Speaker of the House of Commons; 1895 – 1905	Succeeded by Sir James Lowther
Peerage of the United Kingdom
New creation	Viscount Selby; 1905 – 1909	Succeeded by James Gully
