= Whitehaven (constituency) =

Parliamentary constituency in the United Kingdom, 1832–1983

- Former county constituency for the House of Commons
- Boundaries for Whitehaven between 1974–1983
- County: 1832–1974: Cumberland; 1974–1983: Cumbria
- Major settlements: Whitehaven

1832–1983
- Seats: One
- Created from: Cumberland
- Replaced by: Copeland

Whitehaven was a constituency centred on the town of Whitehaven in Cumberland, which returned one Member of Parliament (MP) to the House of Commons of the Parliament of the United Kingdom.

It was created in 1832 and renamed Copeland at the 1983 general election.

== Boundaries ==
The boundaries were unaffected in 1885, under the second Great Reform agreed the previous year, its key limb of The Redistribution of Seats Act 1885 not yet absorbing the bulk of the area of Egremont or 'the Western Division of Cumberland'. The latter mainly rural area, much larger than Whitehaven borough which formed the existing seat, was added to the seat under the Representation of the People Act 1918.

== Members of Parliament ==
Election	Member	Party
1832	Matthias Attwood	Tory
1834	Matthias Attwood	Conservative
1847	Robert Hildyard	Conservative
1857 by-election	George Lyall	Conservative
1865	George Cavendish-Bentinck	Conservative
1891	Sir James Bain	Conservative
1892	Thomas Shepherd Little	Liberal
1895	Augustus Helder	Conservative
1906	William Burnyeat	Liberal
Jan. 1910	John Arthur Jackson	Conservative
Dec. 1910	Thomas Richardson	Labour
1918	James Augustus Grant	Coalition Conservative
1922	Thomas Gavan Duffy	Labour
1924	Robert Hudson	Conservative
1929	M. Philips Price	Labour
1931	William Nunn	Conservative
1935	Frank Anderson	Labour
1959 by-election	Joseph Symonds	Labour
1970	Jack Cunningham	Labour
1983	constituency renamed (with unchanged boundaries), see Copeland	

== Elections ==
=== Elections in the 1830s ===
General election 1832: Whitehaven
Party	Candidate	Votes	%
Tory	Matthias Attwood	210	54.7
Whig	Isaac Littledale	174	45.3
Majority		36	9.4
Turnout		384	83.8
Registered electors		458	
Tory win (new seat)			

General election 1835: Whitehaven
Party	Candidate	Votes	%	±%
Conservative	Matthias Attwood	Unopposed		
Registered electors		460		
Conservative hold				

General election 1837: Whitehaven
Party	Candidate	Votes	%	±%
Conservative	Matthias Attwood	Unopposed		
Registered electors		476		
Conservative hold				

=== Elections in the 1840s ===
General election 1841: Whitehaven
Party	Candidate	Votes	%	±%
Conservative	Matthias Attwood	Unopposed		
Registered electors		558		
Conservative hold				

General election 1847: Whitehaven
Party	Candidate	Votes	%	±%
Conservative	Robert Hildyard	Unopposed		
Registered electors		543		
Conservative hold				

=== Elections in the 1850s ===
General election 1852: Whitehaven
Party	Candidate	Votes	%	±%
Conservative	Robert Hildyard	Unopposed		
Registered electors		512		
Conservative hold				

General election 1857: Whitehaven
Party	Candidate	Votes	%	±%
Conservative	Robert Hildyard	Unopposed		
Registered electors		555		
Conservative hold				

Hildyard's death caused a by-election.

By-election, 17 December 1857: Whitehaven
Party	Candidate	Votes	%	±%
Conservative	George Lyall	Unopposed		
Conservative hold				

General election 1859: Whitehaven
Party	Candidate	Votes	%	±%
Conservative	George Lyall	Unopposed		
Registered electors		571		
Conservative hold				

=== Elections in the 1860s ===
General election 1865: Whitehaven
Party	Candidate	Votes	%	±%
Conservative	George Cavendish-Bentinck	Unopposed		
Registered electors		648		
Conservative hold				

General election 1868: Whitehaven
Party	Candidate	Votes	%	±%
Conservative	George Cavendish-Bentinck	1,125	59.3	N/A
Liberal	Anthony Benn Steward	771	40.7	New
Majority		354	18.6	N/A
Turnout		1,896	76.0	N/A
Registered electors		2,495		
Conservative hold				

=== Elections in the 1870s ===
General election 1874: Whitehaven
Party	Candidate	Votes	%	±%
Conservative	George Cavendish-Bentinck	Unopposed		
Registered electors		2,431		
Conservative hold				

Cavendish-Bentinck was appointed Judge Advocate General of the Armed Forces, causing a by-election.

By-election, 18 Dec 1875: Whitehaven
Party	Candidate	Votes	%	±%
Conservative	George Cavendish-Bentinck	1,503	82.8	N/A
Liberal	Charles Thompson	313	17.2	New
Majority		1,190	65.6	N/A
Turnout		1,816	69.9	N/A
Registered electors		2,599		
Conservative hold		Swing	N/A	

=== Elections in the 1880s ===
General election 1880: Whitehaven
Party	Candidate	Votes	%	±%
Conservative	George Cavendish-Bentinck	1,204	52.9	N/A
Liberal	William Gully	1,072	47.1	N/A
Majority		132	5.8	N/A
Turnout		2,276	86.8	N/A
Registered electors		2,622		
Conservative hold		Swing	N/A	

General election 1885: Whitehaven
Party	Candidate	Votes	%	±%
Conservative	George Cavendish-Bentinck	1,336	54.3	+1.4
Liberal	William Gully	1,125	45.7	−1.4
Majority		211	8.6	+2.8
Turnout		2,461	91.6	+4.8
Registered electors		2,687		
Conservative hold		Swing	+1.4	

General election 1886: Whitehaven
Party	Candidate	Votes	%	±%
Conservative	George Cavendish-Bentinck	1,216	52.3	−2.0
Liberal	Henry Gordon Shee	1,110	47.7	+2.0
Majority		106	4.6	−4.0
Turnout		2,326	86.6	−5.0
Registered electors		2,687		
Conservative hold		Swing	-2.0	

=== Elections in the 1890s ===
Cavendish-Bentinck's death caused a by-election.

By-election, 24 Apr 1891: Whitehaven
Party	Candidate	Votes	%	±%
Conservative	James Bain	1,338	54.8	+2.5
Liberal	Henry Gordon Shee	1,105	45.2	−2.5
Majority		233	9.6	+5.0
Turnout		2,443	90.0	+3.4
Registered electors		2,713		
Conservative hold		Swing	+2.5	

General election 1892: Whitehaven
Party	Candidate	Votes	%	±%
Liberal	Thomas Shepherd Little	1,306	54.6	+6.9
Conservative	James Bain	1,088	45.4	−6.9
Majority		218	9.2	N/A
Turnout		2,394	88.7	+2.1
Registered electors		2,700		
Liberal gain from Conservative		Swing	+6.9	

General election 1895: Whitehaven
Party	Candidate	Votes	%	±%
Conservative	Augustus Helder	1,380	55.3	+9.9
Liberal	Thomas Shepherd Little	1,114	44.7	−9.9
Majority		266	10.6	N/A
Turnout		2,494	90.8	+2.1
Registered electors		2,746		
Conservative gain from Liberal		Swing	+9.9	

=== Elections in the 1900s ===
General election 1900: Whitehaven
Party	Candidate	Votes	%	±%
Conservative	Augustus Helder	1,553	63.9	+8.6
Liberal	W McGowan	876	36.1	−8.6
Majority		677	27.8	+17.2
Turnout		2,429	86.0	−4.8
Registered electors		2,824		
Conservative hold		Swing	+8.6	

General election 1906: Whitehaven
Party	Candidate	Votes	%	±%
Liberal	William Burnyeat	1,507	55.8	+19.7
Conservative	J. Robertson-Walker	1,194	44.2	−19.7
Majority		313	11.6	N/A
Turnout		2,701	91.7	+5.7
Registered electors		2,945		
Liberal gain from Conservative		Swing	+19.7	

=== Elections in the 1910s ===
General election January 1910: Whitehaven
Party	Candidate	Votes	%	±%
Conservative	John Jackson	1,188	41.5	−2.7
Liberal	William Hood Wandless	852	29.7	−26.1
Labour	Andrew Sharp	825	28.8	New
Majority		336	11.8	N/A
Turnout		2,865	83.9	+2.2
Registered electors		3,050		
Conservative gain from Liberal		Swing	+11.7	

General election December 1910: Whitehaven
Party	Candidate	Votes	%	±%
Labour	Thomas Richardson	1,414	53.7	+24.9
Conservative	John Jackson	1,220	46.3	+4.8
Majority		194	7.4	N/A
Turnout		2,634	86.4	−7.5
Registered electors		3,050		
Labour gain from Conservative		Swing	+10.1	

General election 1918: Whitehaven
Party		Candidate	Votes	%	±%
C	Unionist	James Grant	10,736	54.4	+8.1
	Labour	Thomas Gavan-Duffy	9,016	45.6	−8.1
Majority			1,720	8.8	N/A
Turnout			19,752	72.0	−14.4
	Unionist gain from Labour		Swing	+8.1	
C indicates candidate endorsed by the coalition government.

=== Elections in the 1920s ===
General election 1922: Whitehaven
Party	Candidate	Votes	%	±%
Labour	Thomas Gavan-Duffy	10,935	45.3	−0.3
Unionist	James Grant	8,956	37.2	−17.2
Liberal	Henry Kenyon Campbell	4,209	17.5	New
Majority		1,979	8.1	N/A
Turnout		24,100	87.0	+15.0
Labour gain from Unionist		Swing	+8.4	

General election 1923: Whitehaven
Party	Candidate	Votes	%	±%
Labour	Thomas Gavan-Duffy	12,419	53.0	+7.7
Unionist	Robert Hudson	11,029	47.0	+9.8
Majority		1,390	6.0	−2.1
Turnout		23,448	83.1	−3.9
Labour hold		Swing	-1.0	

General election 1924: Whitehaven
Party	Candidate	Votes	%	±%
Unionist	Robert Hudson	13,149	52.8	+5.8
Labour	Thomas Gavan-Duffy	11,741	47.2	−5.8
Majority		1,408	5.6	N/A
Turnout		24,890	88.2	−0.9
Unionist gain from Labour		Swing		

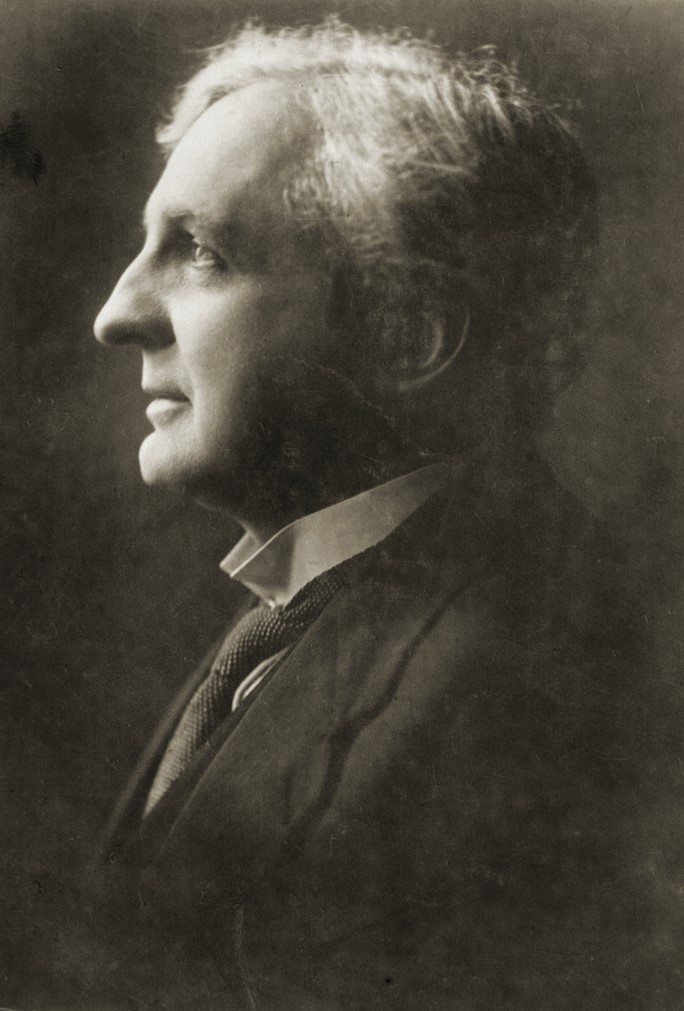
Naylor

General election 1929: Whitehaven
Party	Candidate	Votes	%	±%
Labour	M. Philips Price	14,034	46.8	−0.4
Unionist	Robert Hudson	12,382	41.3	−11.5
Liberal	Henry Naylor	3,558	11.9	New
Majority		1,652	5.5	N/A
Turnout		29,974	88.1	−0.1
Labour gain from Unionist		Swing		

=== Elections in the 1930s ===
General election 1931: Whitehaven
Party	Candidate	Votes	%	±%
Conservative	William Nunn	16,286	53.3	+12.0
Labour	M. Philips Price	14,255	46.7	−0.1
Majority		2,031	6.6	N/A
Turnout		30,541	89.6	+1.5
Conservative gain from Labour		Swing		

General election 1935: Whitehaven
Party	Candidate	Votes	%	±%
Labour	Frank Anderson	14,794	48.9	+2.2
Conservative	William Nunn	14,442	47.8	−5.5
Ind. Labour Party	Tom Stephenson	1,004	3.3	New
Majority		352	1.1	N/A
Turnout		30,240	87.3	−2.3
Labour gain from Conservative		Swing		

=== Election in the 1940s ===
General election 1945: Whitehaven
Party	Candidate	Votes	%	±%
Labour	Frank Anderson	18,568	61.1	+12.2
Conservative	W.O. Hill	11,821	38.9	−8.9
Majority		6,747	22.2	+21.1
Turnout		30,389	82.8	−4.5
Labour hold		Swing		

=== Elections in the 1950s ===
General election 1950: Whitehaven
Party	Candidate	Votes	%	±%
Labour	Frank Anderson	22,850	60.00	
Conservative	William Nunn	15,233	40.00	
Majority		7,617	20.00	
Turnout		38,083	87.04	
Labour hold		Swing		

General election 1951: Whitehaven
Party	Candidate	Votes	%	±%
Labour	Frank Anderson	23,190	59.19	
Conservative	Godfrey William Iredell	15,990	40.81	
Majority		7,200	18.38	
Turnout		39,180	85.24	
Labour hold		Swing		

General election 1955: Whitehaven
Party	Candidate	Votes	%	±%
Labour	Frank Anderson	22,348	58.04	
Conservative	Godfrey William Iredell	16,154	41.96	
Majority		6,194	16.08	
Turnout		38,502	83.78	
Labour hold		Swing		

1959 Whitehaven by-election
Party	Candidate	Votes	%	±%
Labour	Joseph Symonds	21,457	58.61	+0.57
Conservative	Godfrey William Iredell	15,151	41.39	−0.57
Majority		6,306	17.22	+1.14
Turnout		36,608		
Labour hold		Swing		

General election 1959: Whitehaven
Party	Candidate	Votes	%	±%
Labour	Joseph Symonds	22,783	57.77	
Conservative	Howard Jardine Pedraza	16,653	42.23	
Majority		6,130	15.54	
Turnout		39,436	84.54	
Labour hold		Swing		

=== Elections in the 1960s ===
General election 1964: Whitehaven
Party	Candidate	Votes	%	±%
Labour	Joseph Symonds	23,267	60.11	
Conservative	Edmund Brudenell	15,440	39.89	
Majority		7,827	20.22	
Turnout		38,707	82.02	
Labour hold		Swing		

General election 1966: Whitehaven
Party	Candidate	Votes	%	±%
Labour	Joseph Symonds	22,726	61.99	
Conservative	John A Kevill	13,935	38.01	
Majority		8,791	23.98	
Turnout		36,661	78.79	
Labour hold		Swing		

=== Elections in the 1970s ===
General election 1970: Whitehaven
Party	Candidate	Votes	%	±%
Labour	Jack Cunningham	22,974	58.32	
Conservative	W Graham McKay	16,418	41.68	
Majority		6,556	16.64	
Turnout		39,392	78.27	
Labour hold		Swing		

General election February 1974: Whitehaven
Party	Candidate	Votes	%	±%
Labour	Jack Cunningham	23,229	59.42	
Conservative	P.B. Vose	15,867	40.58	
Majority		7,362	18.84	
Turnout		39,096	77.50	
Labour hold		Swing		

General election October 1974: Whitehaven
Party	Candidate	Votes	%	±%
Labour	Jack Cunningham	21,832	55.56	
Conservative	P.B. Vose	11,899	30.28	
Liberal	M. Gilbert	5,563	14.16	New
Majority		9,933	25.28	
Turnout		39,294	77.10	
Labour hold		Swing		

General election 1979: Whitehaven
Party	Candidate	Votes	%	±%
Labour	Jack Cunningham	22,626	52.44	
Conservative	John Somers	17,171	39.80	
Liberal	E. Akister	2,559	5.93	
Independent	W. Dixon	790	1.83	New
Majority		5,455	12.64	
Turnout		43,146	81.74	
Labour hold		Swing		

== Sources ==
- Leigh Rayment's Historical List of MPs – Constituencies beginning with "W" (part 3)
- Craig, F. W. S. (1989) [1977]. British parliamentary election results 1832–1885 (2nd ed.). Chichester: Parliamentary Research Services. p. 330. ISBN 0-900178-26-4.
- Craig, F. W. S. (1989) [1974]. British parliamentary election results 1885–1918 (2nd ed.). Chichester: Parliamentary Research Services. p. 208. ISBN 0-900178-27-2.
- Craig, F. W. S. (1983) [1969]. British parliamentary election results 1918–1949 (3rd ed.). Chichester: Parliamentary Research Services. p. 317. ISBN 0-900178-06-X.
