= Augustus Helder =

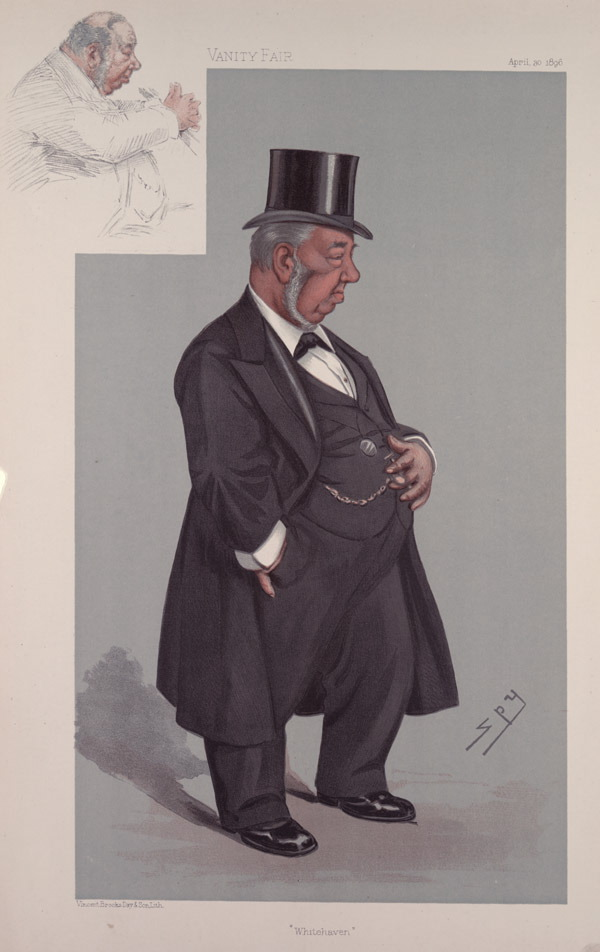
Sir Augustus Helder MP

Sir Augustus Helder (1827 – 31 March 1906) was a British solicitor and Conservative politician who served as the MP for Whitehaven. He won the seat from the Liberals in 1895, held it in 1900, but stood down in 1906, only two months before he died. He was knighted in 1905.

== Sources ==
- Leigh Rayment's Historical List of MPs
- Craig, F.W.S. British Parliamentary Election Results 1885-1918
- Whitaker's Almanack, 1896 to 1906 editions
