= Joseph Ferguson (MP) =

English politician

Joseph Ferguson (1788 – 17 February 1863) was an English politician. He was born at Carlisle, the son of Robert Ferguson, Esq and his wife Anne daughter of John Wood Esq of Maryport, and was educated at Carlisle grammar school.

== Career ==
A liberal reformer by conviction, he joined a manufacturing firm in Carlisle, and was soon a sleeping partner in the firm. He was made President of the Chamber of Commerce in Carlisle in 1833 on the reform of the franchise. He was "of decidedly liberal opinions; in favour of parliamentary reform, opposed to the Maynooth Grant". The Maynooth Grant, to an Irish catholic seminary, had been rejected by Peel's Conservative government, but in 1847 post-famine was accepted by Lord John Russell's Whig government.

== Politics ==
The success of the firm led to his appointment as Mayor of Carlisle in 1837. This was followed by the call to the magistrate's bench in 1840. He was first elected as MP for Carlisle in July 1852. Ferguson voted for the ballot of 1853 during the Adullamite Cave crisis. He was defeated in 1857 and retired from politics.

== Family ==
He married Maria Isabella Clarke, daughter of John Clarke, Esq., of Bebside House, Northumberland in 1815 and they had a son, Robert, born 1 April 1817. Robert became MP for Carlisle in 1874.

== Death ==
Ferguson died on 17 February 1863.
