= James Bain (Whitehaven MP) =

Sir James Bain of Crofthead (1817–1898) was a Scottish iron-founder who served as Lord Provost of Glasgow from 1874 to 1877. Bain Street in Glasgow is named after him.

== Life ==
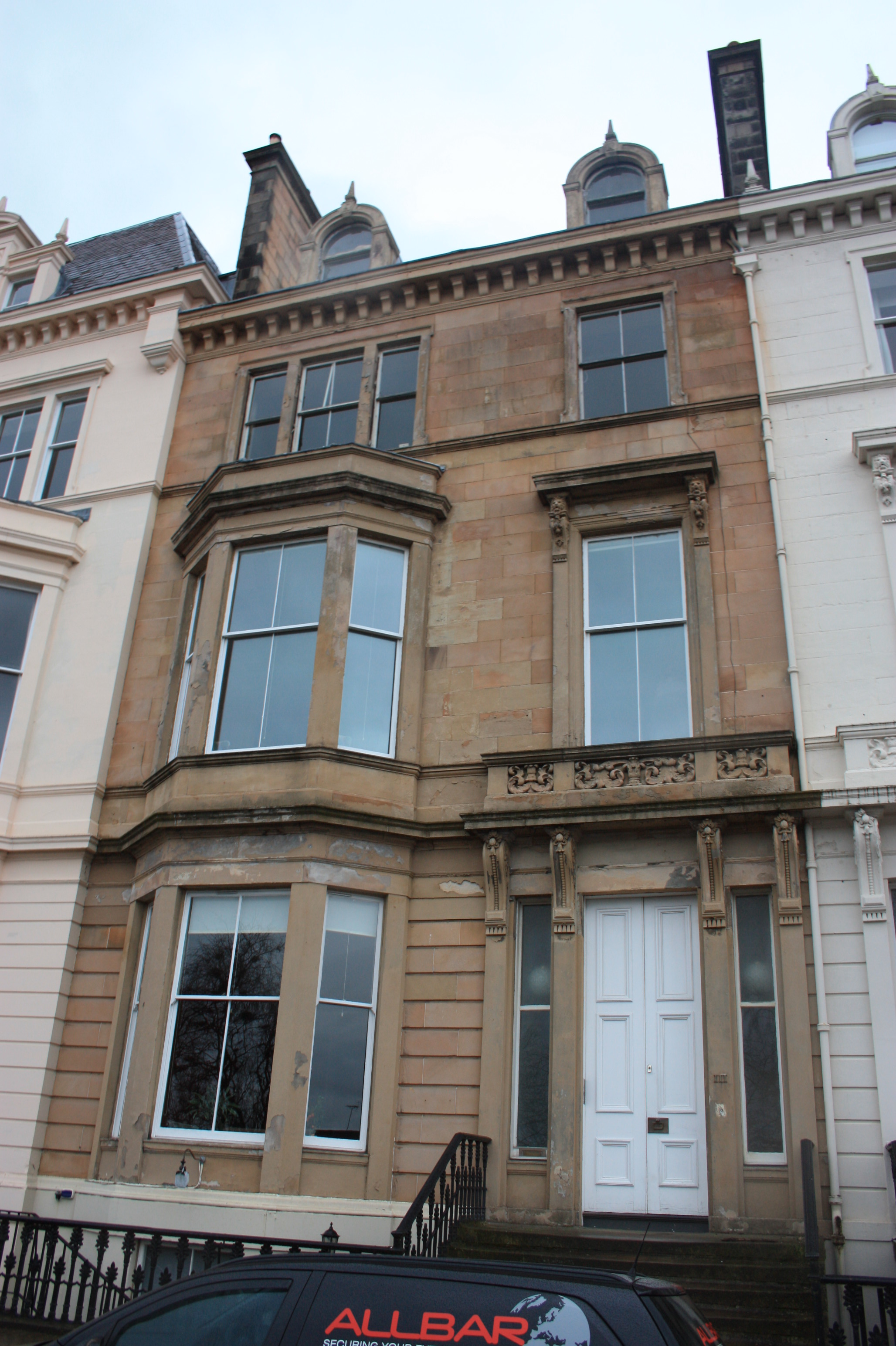
3 Park Terrace, Glasgow

He was born in Glasgow on 22 January 1817 and was the son of Robert Bain (died 1838).

He was general manager of William Baird & Co.

His house at 3 Park Terrace, just east of Kelvingrove Park, was designed in 1855 by Charles Wilson and had a room lined in real gold. Visitors of the house included Ulysses Grant.

He became a town councillor in 1863, was elected Lord Provost in 1874, and knighted by Queen Victoria in 1877 when he was replaced as Lord Provost by William Collins the famous Scottish publisher.

He was Deputy Chairman of the Clyde Navigation Trust and together with Sir James Lumsden organised the building of the Prince's Dock on the River Clyde.

He was a Member of Parliament for Whitehaven from 1891 to 1892 and founded the Whitehaven Ironworks there.

Bain died on 25 April 1898. Bain's gold room was restored 1992 to 1995.

== Artistic recognition ==
He was portrayed in office by Sir Daniel Macnee.

== Family ==
He was married to Mary Dove. Their children included John Dove Bain (died 1843) and James Robert Bain.
