= Hubert Duncombe =

British soldier and politician (1862–1918)

Colonel the Honourable Hubert Ernest Valentine Duncombe, DSO (14 February 1862 – 21 October 1918) was a British soldier and politician who served as the Conservative MP for Egremont from 1895 to 1900.

Duncombe was a younger son of William Duncombe, a Conservative politician later created Earl of Feversham, and his wife Mabel Violet (née Graham). He was educated at Harrow School, the Royal Military Academy, Woolwich, and Magdalene College, Cambridge. Following Cambridge, he was admitted to bar at the Inner Temple. He married music hall performer Nellie Leamar in 1883.

In 1893 he was selected as the prospective Conservative candidate for Egremont; he had previously been suggested as a possible candidate for York. He was elected in the 1895 general election, with a majority of 131. He did not seek re-election at the 1900 general election.

Duncombe was an officer of the Volunteer Force, originally as a captain with the 5th VB Devonshire Regiment from 1891, and later with the 2nd VB Yorkshire Regiment. He volunteered for active service in the Second Boer War in February 1900, and was commissioned a captain in the 14th battalion Imperial Yeomanry, leaving Southampton for South Africa in early April 1900 on the SS Carisbrooke Castle. He served as the adjutant of the battalion, commanded by his fellow MP, Arthur Montagu Brookfield, and was promoted to major on 15 September 1900. He was later promoted to lieutenant-colonel and awarded the Distinguished Service Order.

In 1904, he was declared bankrupt, with debts of around £4,400. In 1913, he was implicated in a fraud by Edmund Eaton, who had promoted an oil company as though it were endorsed by a Royal Commission; Duncombe was a director of the company, but resigned his directorship immediately and the charges against him were dismissed.
