= Robert Ferguson (Carlisle MP) =

British Liberal politician (1817-98)

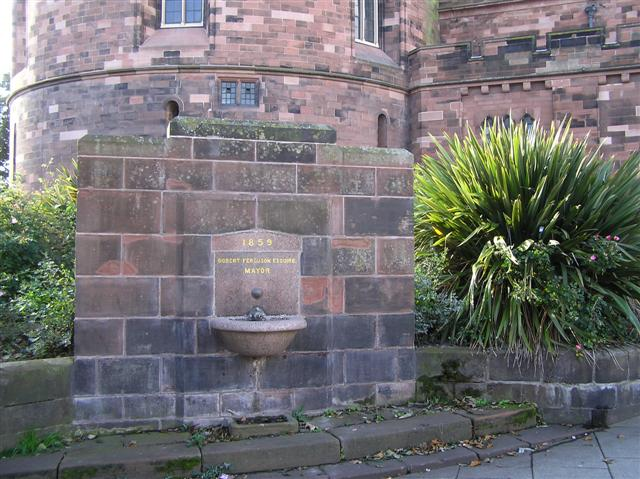
- A drinking fountain in Carlisle carrying the name of Robert Ferguson

Member of Parliament for Carlisle
- In office 1874–1886 Serving with Wilfrid Lawson 1874-1885
- Preceded by: Wilfrid Lawson; Edmund Potter
- Succeeded by: William Court Gully

Personal details
- Born: 1 April 1817
- Died: 1 September 1898 (aged 81)
- Political party: Liberal
- Parent: Joseph Ferguson (father)
- Occupation: Mill-owner, antiquarian

Robert Ferguson (1 April 1817 – 1 September 1898) was an English mill-owner from Cumberland, antiquarian and Liberal politician, who sat in the House of Commons from 1874 to 1886.

== Biography ==
Ferguson was the son of Joseph Ferguson of Ferguson Brothers cotton manufacturers and his wife Maria Isabella Clarke daughter of John Clarke of Bebside House Northumberland. His father's company owned the Holme Head Works textile mills in Denton Holme. Ferguson became a partner in the firm of Ferguson Brothers and was at one time a Major in the 1st Battalion Cumberland Rifle Volunteers. He was Mayor of Carlisle in 1855 and 1858. He was also chairman of the Carlisle School Board and president of the Carlisle Mechanics Institute.

Ferguson was elected MP for Carlisle in February 1874. His father had also held the seat from 1852 to 1857. Ferguson held the seat until 1886. At the General election he retired from politics.

Ferguson funded the Robert Ferguson Primary school at Denton Holme, which was opened in 1880 and which was enlarged twice in his lifetime. He lived at Morton Manor, which was later to become Chance's Park.

Ferguson was also an antiquarian and a Fellow of the Society of Antiquaries. He died on 1 September 1898 aged 81.

== Works ==
Ferguson was the author of several books, including:

- The shadow of the pyramid, a series of sonnets (1847)
- The Northmen in Cumberland & Westmoreland (1856)
- The Teutonic name-system applied to the family names of France, England, & Germany (1864)
- Surnames as a Science (1883)

Parliament of the United Kingdom
| Preceded by Sir Wilfrid Lawson; Edmund Potter | Member of Parliament for Carlisle; 1874–1886; With: Sir Wilfrid Lawson 1874–85 | Succeeded by William Court Gully |
