= East Cumberland =

Parliamentary constituency in the United Kingdom, 1832–1885

- Former county constituency for the House of Commons
- Form 1832-1868 and this area was left intact until 1885. Extract from 1837 result: the central 'singly' orange area which omits to mention the other incumbent, of the same party.

1832–1885
- Seats: two
- Created from: Cumberland
- Replaced by: Cockermouth, Eskdale and Penrith

East Cumberland is a former county constituency in the House of Commons of the Parliament of the United Kingdom. It elected two Members of Parliament (MPs) by the bloc vote system of election.

== Boundaries ==
1832–1885: The Wards of Cumberland, Eskdale and Leath.

In 1832 the historic county of Cumberland, in north west England, was split for parliamentary purposes into two county divisions. These were the East division (with a place of election at Carlisle) and West Cumberland (where voting took place at Cockermouth). Each division returned two members to Parliament.

The only parliamentary borough included in the East division, between 1832 and 1885, (whose non-resident 40-shilling freeholders could vote in the county constituency) was Carlisle. (Source: Stooks Smith).

== History ==
The first two Members of Parliament for this division were the last pair of representatives for the undivided county before the 1832 general election.

On the formation of Earl Grey's administration in 1830 Sir James Graham had received the post of First Lord of the Admiralty, with a seat in the cabinet. He resigned over the Irish Church question in 1834, and eventually joined the Conservatives in 1837. His former constituents did not re-elect Sir James when he sought election as a Tory at the 1837 general election.

The division proved to be favourable to the Liberal Party as no Conservative was elected until after the Reform Act 1867 and the party never held both seats simultaneously. In 1868 and again in 1880 a Conservative MP was returned.

The Howard family (whose head was the Earl of Carlisle) seem to have had influence in the constituency. The sixth son of the 6th Earl of Carlisle, the Honourable Charles Howard, represented the division from 1840 until his death in 1879. He was joined by Edward Howard in the representation of the constituency in 1876. Charles Howard's son George was the third Howard to sit for the constituency.

In 1885 this division was abolished, when the East and West Cumberland county divisions were replaced by four new single-member county constituencies. These were Cockermouth, Egremont (the Western division), Eskdale (Northern division) and Penrith (Mid division). In addition there were two remaining Cumberland borough constituencies; Carlisle and Whitehaven.

== Members of Parliament ==
- Constituency created (1832)

Election	First member	First party	Second member	Second party
1832	William Blamire	Whig	Sir James Graham, Bt ^{a}	Whig
1836 by-election	William James	Radical	Sir James Graham, Bt ^{a}	Whig
1837	William James	Radical	Francis Aglionby	Radical
1840 by-election	William James	Radical	Hon. Charles Howard	Whig
1847	William Marshall	Whig	Hon. Charles Howard	Whig
1859	William Marshall	Liberal	Hon. Charles Howard	Liberal
1868	William Nicholson Hodgson	Conservative	Hon. Charles Howard	Liberal
1876 by-election	Stafford Howard	Liberal	Hon. Charles Howard	Liberal
1879 by-election	Stafford Howard	Liberal	George Howard	Liberal
1880	Stafford Howard	Liberal	Sir Richard Musgrave, Bt	Conservative
1881 by-election	Stafford Howard	Liberal	George Howard	Liberal
1885	Constituency abolished			

Notes:-

- ^{a} Graham contested the 1837 United Kingdom general election as a Conservative candidate, although he lost.

== See also ==
- List of former United Kingdom Parliament constituencies

== Election results ==
=== Elections in the 1830s ===
General election 1832: East Cumberland
Party	Candidate	Votes	%
Whig	William Blamire	Unopposed	
Whig	James Graham	Unopposed	
Registered electors		4,035	
Whig win (new seat)			
Whig win (new seat)			

General election 1835: East Cumberland
Party	Candidate	Votes	%
Whig	William Blamire	Unopposed	
Whig	James Graham	Unopposed	
Registered electors		3,992	
Whig hold			
Whig hold			

Blamire resigned after being appointed as Chief Commissioner for the Commutation of Tithes, causing a by-election.

By-election, 2 September 1836: East Cumberland
Party	Candidate	Votes	%
Radical	William James	Unopposed	
Radical gain from Whig			

General election 1837: East Cumberland
Party	Candidate	Votes	%
Radical	Francis Aglionby	2,294	38.1
Radical	William James	2,124	35.3
Conservative	James Graham	1,605	26.6
Majority		519	8.7
Turnout		3,699	79.8
Registered electors		4,638	
Radical gain from Whig			
Radical gain from Whig			

=== Elections in the 1840s ===
Aglionby's death caused a by-election.

By-election, 20 July 1840: East Cumberland
Party	Candidate	Votes	%	±%
Whig	Charles Howard	Unopposed		
Whig gain from Radical				

General election 1841: East Cumberland
Party	Candidate	Votes	%	±%
Whig	Charles Howard	2,086	34.9	N/A
Radical	William James	1,988	33.2	−40.2
Conservative	William W Stephenson	1,906	31.9	+5.3
Turnout		c. 3,943	c. 81.4	c. +1.6
Registered electors		4,842		
Majority		98	1.7	N/A
Whig gain from Radical		Swing	N/A	
Majority		82	1.3	−7.4
Radical hold		Swing	−22.8	

General election 1847: East Cumberland
Party	Candidate	Votes	%	±%
Whig	Charles Howard	Unopposed		
Whig	William Marshall	Unopposed		
Registered electors		5,348		
Whig hold				
Whig gain from Radical				

=== Elections in the 1850s ===
General election 1852: East Cumberland
Party	Candidate	Votes	%	±%
Whig	Charles Howard	2,375	36.0	N/A
Whig	William Marshall	2,255	34.2	N/A
Conservative	Thomas Salkeld	1,964	29.8	New
Majority		291	4.4	N/A
Turnout		4,279 (est)	80.0 (est)	N/A
Registered electors		5,351		
Whig hold		Swing	N/A	
Whig hold		Swing	N/A	

General election 1857: East Cumberland
Party	Candidate	Votes	%	±%
Whig	Charles Howard	Unopposed		
Whig	William Marshall	Unopposed		
Registered electors		5,693		
Whig hold				
Whig hold				

General election 1859: East Cumberland
Party	Candidate	Votes	%	±%
Liberal	Charles Howard	Unopposed		
Liberal	William Marshall	Unopposed		
Registered electors		5,582		
Liberal hold				
Liberal hold				

=== Elections in the 1860s ===
General election 1865: East Cumberland
Party	Candidate	Votes	%	±%
Liberal	Charles Howard	Unopposed		
Liberal	William Marshall	Unopposed		
Registered electors		5,455		
Liberal hold				
Liberal hold				

General election 1868: East Cumberland
Party	Candidate	Votes	%	±%
Conservative	William Nicholson Hodgson	2,626	34.7	New
Liberal	Charles Howard	2,546	33.6	N/A
Liberal	William Marshall	2,397	31.7	N/A
Majority		229	3.0	N/A
Turnout		5,098 (est)	76.2 (est)	N/A
Registered electors		6,694		
Conservative gain from Liberal		Swing	N/A	
Liberal hold		Swing	N/A	

=== Elections in the 1870s ===
General election 1874: East Cumberland
Party	Candidate	Votes	%	±%
Liberal	Charles Howard	2,943	35.9	+2.3
Conservative	William Nicholson Hodgson	2,629	32.1	−2.6
Conservative	Richard Musgrave	2,622	32.0	N/A
Majority		321	3.9	
Turnout		5,569 (est)	77.1 (est)	+0.9
Registered electors		7,225		
Liberal hold		Swing	+2.5	
Conservative hold		Swing	−2.5	

Hodgson's death caused a by-election.

By-election, 28 Apr 1876: East Cumberland
Party	Candidate	Votes	%	±%
Liberal	Stafford Howard	2,939	51.4	+15.5
Conservative	Richard Musgrave	2,783	48.6	−15.5
Majority		156	2.8	N/A
Turnout		5,722	78.1	+1.0
Registered electors		7,323		
Liberal gain from Conservative		Swing	+15.5	

Charles Howard's death led to a by-election.

By-election, 25 Apr 1879: East Cumberland
Party	Candidate	Votes	%	±%
Liberal	George Howard	Unopposed		
Liberal hold				

=== Elections in the 1880s ===
General election 1880: East Cumberland
Party	Candidate	Votes	%	±%
Conservative	Richard Musgrave	3,161	34.1	−30.0
Liberal	Stafford Howard	3,083	33.2	+15.2
Liberal	George Howard	3,039	32.7	+14.7
Majority		78	0.9	
Turnout		6,244 (est)	80.1 (est)	+3.0
Registered electors		7,798		
Conservative hold		Swing	−15.1	
Liberal hold		Swing	+15.1	

Musgrave's death caused a by-election.

By-election, 28 Feb 1881: East Cumberland
Party	Candidate	Votes	%	±%
Liberal	George Howard	3,071	50.2	−15.7
Conservative	James Lowther	3,041	49.8	+15.7
Majority		30	0.6	N/A
Turnout		6,112	77.1	−3.0 (est)
Registered electors		7,928		
Liberal gain from Conservative		Swing	−15.7	
