= 1879 East Cumberland by-election =

UK Parliamentary by-election

The 1879 by-election for the East Cumberland constituency of the United Kingdom Parliament occurred on 25 April 1879. It was called due to the death of the incumbent Liberal MP, Charles Howard, and was subsequently won by the Liberal candidate George Howard.
