= Sir Richard Musgrave, 11th Baronet =

English politician (1838–1881)

Sir Richard Courtenay Musgrave
- Born: 21 August 1838
- Died: 13 February 1881 (Aged 42)
- Children: 4, including Sir Richard George Musgrave
- Father: Sir George Musgrave, 10th Baronet

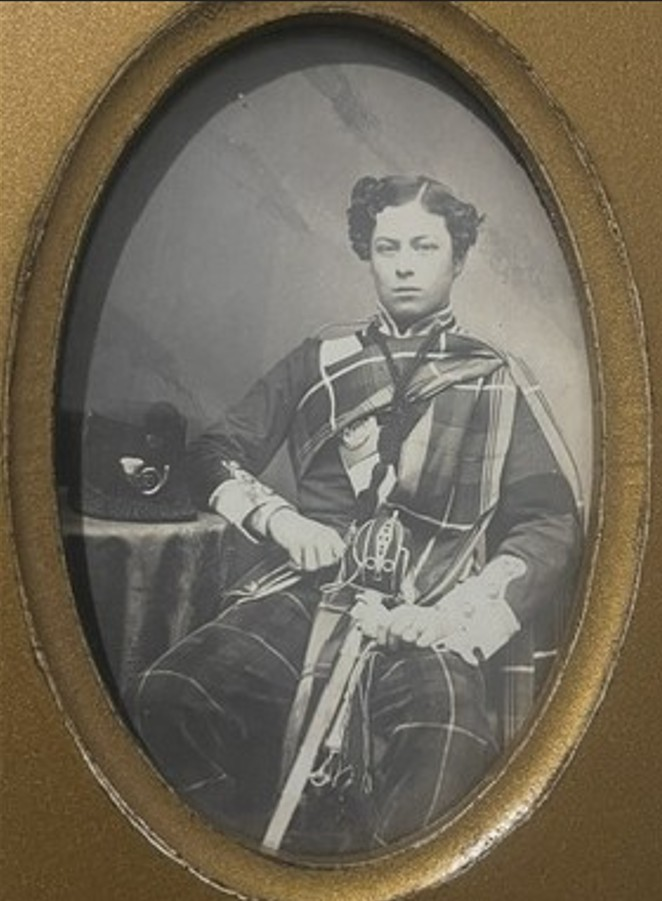
Ensign Richard Courtney Musgrave in the 71st Highland Foot possibly in India or before.

Sir Richard Courtenay Musgrave, 11th Baronet (21 August 1838 – 13 February 1881) was an English Conservative Party politician who sat in the House of Commons from 1880 to 1881. He was educated at Eton College and was an officer in the 71st Highlanders. In 1872, he inherited the baronetcy on the death of his father. He was a JP and Deputy Lieutenant for Cumberland and became Lord Lieutenant of Westmorland in 1876.

Musgrave stood unsuccessfully for parliament at East Cumberland in 1874 and 1876. He was elected as one of the two Members of Parliament (MPs) for East Cumberland at the 1880 general election, but died the following year at the age of 42.

== Family ==
Musgrave was the son of Sir George Musgrave, 10th Baronet and his wife Charlotte Graham, daughter of Sir James Graham, 1st Baronet, of Netherby.

Musgrave married Adora Frances Olga Wells, daughter of Peter Wells, of Windsor Forest and Great Park in 1867. He was succeeded by his son, Sir Richard George Musgrave.

Parliament of the United Kingdom
Preceded by George Howard; Stafford Howard	Member of Parliament for East Cumberland; 1880 – 1881; With: Stafford Howard	Succeeded by Stafford Howard; George Howard
Baronetage of England
Preceded by George Musgrave	Baronet (of Hartley Castle); 1872–1881	Succeeded by Richard Musgrave
