= Francis Aglionby =

English politician

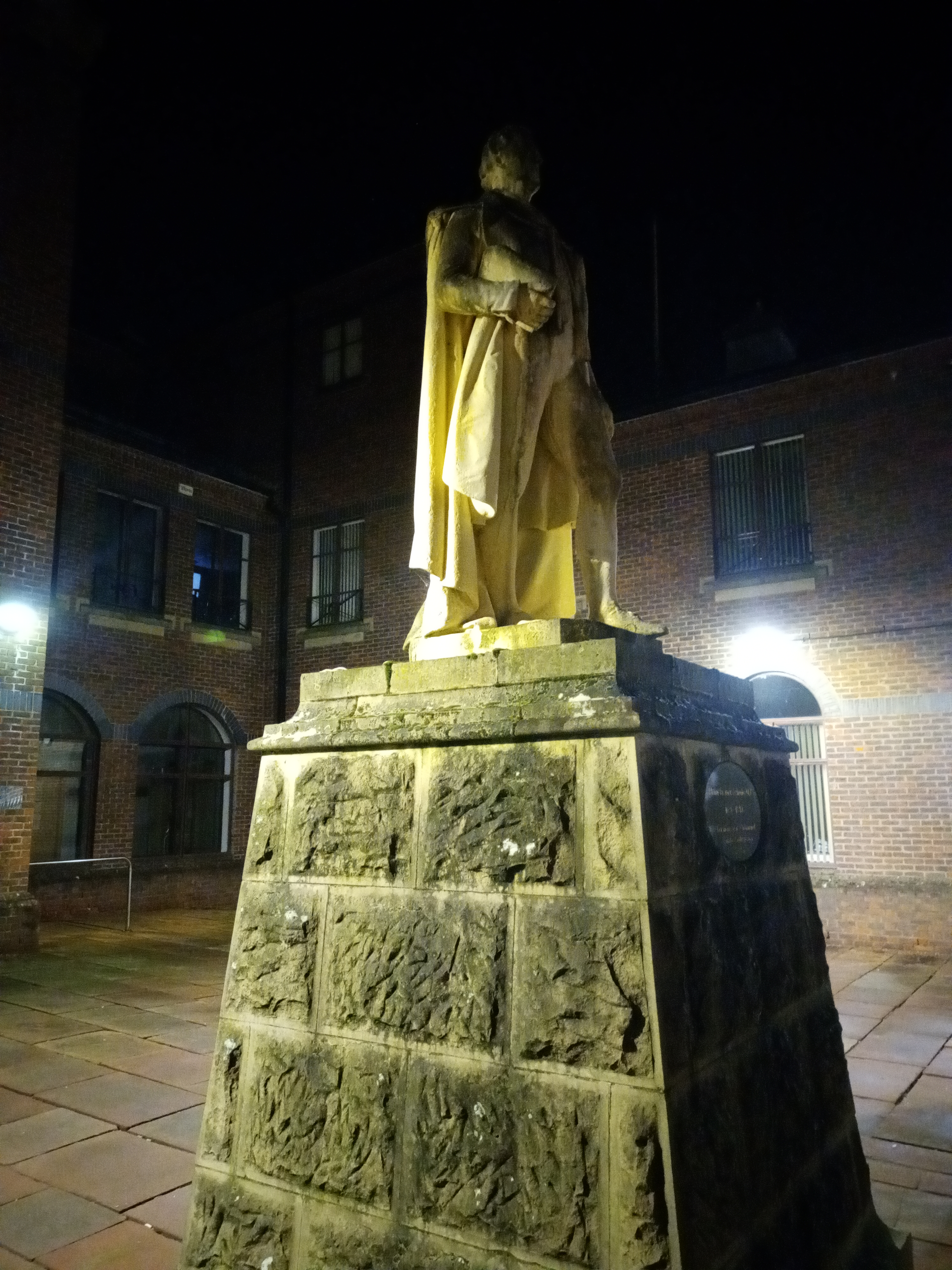
A statue of Francis Aglionby in Carlisle, England

Maj. Francis Aglionby (born Yates; 12 May 1777 – 1 July 1840) was an English Whig politician.

Aglionby was born at Skirwith Abbey, Cumberland, the eldest son of John Ofeur Yates, and Mary Aglionby. In 1822, he assumed the Aglionby surname in order to inherit from his maternal aunt.

He was educated at Rugby School. He earned his B.A. from Cambridge in 1799 and in November that year was admitted to the bar at Gray's Inn. However, instead of pursuing a career in law, he accepted a commission in the Royal Cumberland Militia, where he rose to the rank of Major. He served as chairman of the county's quarter sessions from 1818 until his death.

Aglionby stood for election to Parliament in Cumberland Western at a by-election in 1833 and again at the 1835 general election, but without success. He won a seat at the 1837 general election, when he was elected as Member of Parliament (MP) for Cumberland Eastern, and held the seat until his sudden death in 1840 while entering the courthouse in Carlisle.

In 1814, he married Mary Matthews, daughter of J. M. Matthews, of Wigton Hall. They had three daughters and one son. He was buried at Ainstable, Cumberland.

== Sources ==
- W. W. Bean. The Parliamentary Representation of Six Northern Counties of England. (1890) p. 15.

Parliament of the United Kingdom
Preceded by Sir James Graham, Bt; William James	Member of Parliament for East Cumberland; 1837 – 1840; With: William James	Succeeded by Hon. Charles Howard; William James
