= Area (architecture) =

Excavated subterranean space around a building, for lighting a basement

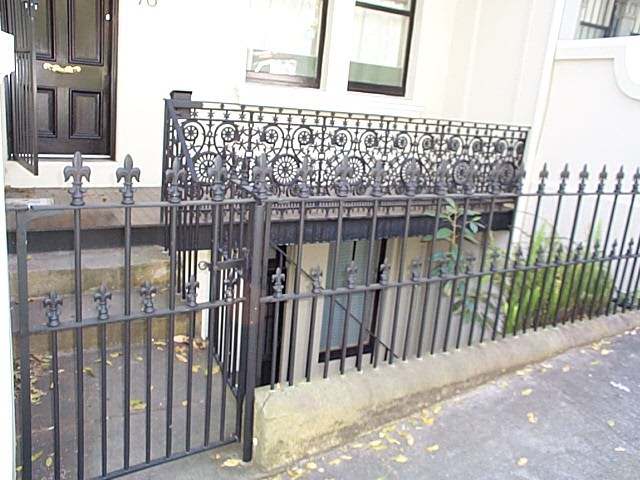
Area railing and steps on a terraced house in Australia

In architecture, an area (areaway in North America) is an excavated, subterranean space around the walls of a building, designed to admit light into a basement. Also called a lightwell, it often provides access to the house and a store-room/service cupboard for tradesmen, such as a coal store vault under the pavement.

The term is most commonly applied to urban houses of the Georgian period in the UK, where it was normal for the service rooms, such as the kitchen, scullery and laundry, to be in the basement. Areas were commonly enclosed for safety reasons by wrought iron or cast iron railings, which became one of the principal decorative features of the astylar terraced houses of this period. Areas are also found in the English and French country house, where basements were popular in the 18th century as a way of accommodating service functions while allowing all four faces of a symmetrical Classical building to relate directly to its landscape setting, as at Mereworth Castle in Kent or The Abbey in Cumbria. Basements, and consequently areas, decreased in popularity in the 19th century, as attitudes to servants changed, although they continued to be constructed as service accommodation in urban settings where land was at a premium until the early 20th century. A suburban residential application can be seen at the Gamble House in Pasadena, California, to light the laundry and service areas of the expansive basement.

In early 18th-century house descriptions, the area was usually called the "airy", which suggests that its primary function was ventilation, needed to prevent cooking smells from percolating upstairs to the rooms above. This implies that the term "area" was a corruption of "airey" rather than vice versa.

== Airey ==
In North London, it was known colloquially as "the airey". It is a subject of an old-time children's ball-bouncing rhyme, which begins:

"One, two, three, alairy

My ball is down the airey
Don't forget to give it to Mary

Early in the morning".

== See also ==
- Atrium
- Clerestory
- Skylight
- Light tube
- Ventilation shaft
- Daylighting
