= James Lushington =

British Member of Parliament

General Sir James Law Lushington GCB (10 May 1779 – 29 May 1859) was a British Member of Parliament and Director of the East India Company.

He was born in Bottisham, Cambridgeshire, the third son of James Stephen Lushington of Rodmersham, Kent, vicar of Newcastle upon Tyne and prebendary of Carlisle. He was the brother of Stephen Rumbold Lushington.

He joined the East India Company as a cadet in 1796, and was successively promoted ensign in 1797, lieutenant of the 4th cavalry battalion in 1799, adjutant in 1800, captain in 1804, major in 1812, lieut.-colonel in 1819; colonel in 1829; major-general in 1837; lieutenant-general in 1849 and general in 1854.

He was elected MP for Petersfield from 1825 to 1826, Hastings from 1826 to 1827, and Carlisle from 1827 to 1831. He was also Chairman of the East India Company (in 1838, 1842 and 1848).

He was appointed Commander of the Order of the Bath (CB) in 1818, Knight Commander of the Order of the Bath (KCB) in 1837 and Knight Grand Cross of the Order of the Bath (GCB) in the 1838 Coronation Honours.

He married Rosetta Sophia Costen, but had no children.

Parliament of the United Kingdom
| Preceded by Philip Musgrave; Hylton Jolliffe | Member of Parliament for Petersfield; 1825–1826; With: Hylton Jolliffe | Succeeded by William Marshall; Hylton Jolliffe |
| Preceded by Charles Wetherell; William Curtis | Member of Parliament for Hastings; 1826–1827; With: Evelyn Denison | Succeeded by Joseph Planta; Evelyn Denison |
| Preceded by Philip Musgrave; James Graham | Member of Parliament for Carlisle; 1827–1831; With: James Graham 1827–29; William Scott 1829–30; Philip Howard 1830–31 | Succeeded by William James; Philip Howard |
