= William James (Carlisle MP) =

English Radical politician (1791–1861)

William James (29 March 1791 – 4 May 1861) was an English Radical politician. A Liverpool-born slave-owner, he sat in the House of Commons as a Member of Parliament (MP) for constituencies in Cumberland for twenty years over the three decades from 1820.

== Early life ==
James was born in Liverpool, to a family enriched by his grandfather William James (1735–1798), a slave trader, plantation owner and slave owner. His father William Evans James was from Liverpool, and his mother Elizabeth was a daughter of Nicholas Ashton, of Woolton Hall, Lancashire. He was baptised at a Paradise Street Unitarian Chapel in Liverpool, but later practised as an Anglican.

He was educated at Eton and Jesus College, Cambridge, then Trinity College, Cambridge. When his grandfather died in 1798, the Clifton Hill Plantation at Saint Thomas-in-the-East, Jamaica was placed in a trust which passed to young William in 1817.

The Slavery Abolition Act 1833 abolished slavery throughout the British Empire, but paid compensation to slave-owners for the loss of their property. The £20 million total cost amounted to 40% of the United Kingdom's annual budget. James was awarded £4,713 14 shillings and 9 pennies (equivalent to £655,107 in 2024).

== Career ==
At the general election in March 1820, James was persuaded by the lesser tradesmen of Carlisle to stand for the borough of Carlisle. He polled poorly on the first day, and withdrew.

However, one of the two winners, John Curwen, was also elected for the county seat of Cumberland, and chose to sit for the county. The resulting by-election in May was a heated two-way contest between James and Sir Philip Musgrave, Bt. Polling lasted for seven days, with troops called after disturbances. At the end, James won with 468 votes to Musgrave's 382. James's expenses totalled £17,000 (equivalent to £2.1 million in 2024), including £8,000 on bribes and treating; the defeated Musgrave had spent £23,000.

In Parliament, James made many interventions but no major speeches. He focused on political reform, repeatedly calling for universal suffrage, and he supported protesters imprisoned after the 1819 Peterloo massacre in Manchester. He claimed to support an end to slavery, but did little to promote the cause.

James voted consistently with the radicals until 1825, when he began to moderate his stances. The following year with falling returns from his Jamaican estates, James decided not to defend his seat at the 1826 general election. He was nonetheless nominated, but did not attend, and finished in a poor third place.

James served as High Sheriff of Cumberland in 1826–27. He did not contest the two Carlisle by-elections in the 1820s, nor the 1831 general election, but he was re-elected for Carlisle in 1831 with the support of campaigners for parliamentary reform.

He retreated from his earlier support for universal suffrage, and under pressure from Carlisle he backed the more modest electoral reforms proposed in the bill which became the Reform Act 1832. He was returned at the 1832 general election, and in July 1833, during the committee stage of the Abolition of Slavery Bill, he told the Irish nationalist leader Daniel O'Connell that: "in spite of slavery, the slaves in the West Indies were better off than the labourers of this country. If the peasants of Ireland were as well off as the negroes of the West Indies, the hon. and learned member for Dublin might indeed give up his agitation, for it would be useless."

At the 1835 general election, James stood down in Carlisle. In 1836, he was elected unopposed in a by-election for East Cumberland. He was returned again in contested elections in 1837 and 1841, but stood down at the 1847 general election when he decided that a contest would be too expensive.

== Personal life ==
In 1815, James bought Barrock Lodge near Carlisle in Cumberland, a former country estate of the 3rd Duke of Portland. In 1816, he married Frances "Fanny" Rutson, the daughter of William Calton Rutson of Allerton Lodge, a Liverpool cotton broker. They had ten sons and three daughters, but seven of the thirteen children died before their parents.

James died at Barrock Lodge on 4 May 1861. Fanny had died ten months earlier, on 6 July 1860. He was succeeded in Barrock Lodge by his eldest son, William Edward James, also High Sheriff of Cumberland.

== See also ==
- John Ashton Yates

Parliament of the United Kingdom
Preceded by John Christian Curwen; Sir James Graham, 1st Bt	Member of Parliament for Carlisle; 1820–1826; With: Sir James Graham, 1st Bt; Sir Philip Musgrave, Bt	Succeeded by Sir James Graham, 2nd Bt; Sir Philip Musgrave, Bt
Preceded by James Law Lushington; Philip Howard	Member of Parliament for Carlisle; 1831–1835; With: Philip Howard	Succeeded by William Marshall; Philip Howard
Preceded by William Blamire; Sir James Graham, Bt	Member of Parliament for East Cumberland; 1836–1847; With: Sir James Graham, 2nd Bt to 1837; Francis Aglionby 1837–1840; Hon. Charles Howard from 1840	Succeeded by William Marshall; Hon. Charles Howard
Honorary titles
Preceded by Humphrey Senhouse	High Sheriff of Cumberland; 1827	Succeeded by Thomas Parker
