= Christian Howard (theologian) =

British Anglican leader (1916–1999)

Dame Christian Howard
- Born: Rosemary Christian Howard; 5 September 1916; Castle Howard, Yorkshire, England
- Died: 22 April 1999 (aged 82); York, England
- Awards: Honorary degree of Lambeth Master of Arts; Dame Commander of the Order of the British Empire (DBE)

Dame Rosemary Christian Howard DBE (5 September 1916 – 22 April 1999) was an Anglican theologian from the aristocratic Howard family. She was created a Dame Commander of the Order of the British Empire in the 1986 New Year Honours for services to the Church of England and the British Council of Churches.

== Early life and education ==
Howard was born at her family seat Castle Howard, one of five children of politician Hon. Geoffrey William Algernon Howard, fifth son of George Howard, 9th Earl of Carlisle and Rosalind Howard, Countess of Carlisle; and his wife, Hon. Ethel Christian, daughter of Paul Methuen, 3rd Baron Methuen. She was baptised at one month old by St Stephen's Chapel at the Palace of Westminster by Rev. William Hartley Carnegie, Chaplain at the House of Commons.

In April 1932, her mother died of double pneumonia. In March 1935, she was presented at court by her maternal grandmother, Lady Methuen. Her father died unexpectedly three months later in London, where he had rented a house in Hyde Park for her debutante season.

Two of her brothers, Maj. Mark Paul Geoffrey Howard and Flt. Lt. Christopher John Geoffrey Howard, were killed in action in 1944. Her surviving brother was George Howard, Baron Howard of Henderskelfe.

In 1943, she was awarded a Lambeth Diploma in Theology. One of her tutors was Michael Ramsey, later the 100th Archbishop of Canterbury.

== Career ==
Howard worked for the ordination of women, as well as being active in the ecumenical movement. She was remembered as "a great character, a great Christian woman and a formidable person" by the Archdeacon of York, George Austin, who was one her staunchest opponents on the ordination of women. Her grandmother, Rosalind Howard, Countess of Carlisle, had been a tireless worker for the women's suffrage organization - as a suffragist, wedded to legal means, rather than a suffragette - and Howard followed her example in her work to achieve the ordination of women to the priesthood.

A founding member of the Movement for the Ordination of Women, she concentrated her major effort on the synodical process to secure the necessary legislation. In 1972 she wrote a report for General Synod entitled The Ordination of Women to Priesthood. She earned the Lambeth Diploma in Theology, was appointed a lay canon provincial of York Minster, served on General Synod 1970–85, was a delegate to the World Council of Churches (WCC) in 1961 and 1968, was appointed to the Faith and Order Commission of the WCC and served as the first woman vice-moderator.
