= Hylton Jolliffe =

English politician

Hylton Jolliffe (28 February 1773 – 13 January 1843) was an English politician.

Joliffe was the eldest son of William Jolliffe (1745–1802) of Merstham and his wife Eleanor, daughter and heir of Sir Richard Hylton, 5th Baronet, of Hayton Castle in Cumberland. He was educated at Westminster School and at Lincoln's Inn. In 1804 he married Elizabeth Rose, the illegitimate daughter of Robert Shirley, 7th Earl Ferrers. The couple had no children, but Joliffe fathered two illegitimate sons.

He was a Member of Parliament (MP) for the borough of Petersfield for most of the period between 1796 and 1834. His father represented the same borough for 34 years, and the two served alongside each other from 1796 to 1797.

Parliament of Great Britain
Preceded by William Jolliffe; Charles Greville	Member of Parliament for Petersfield; 1796–1797; With: William Jolliffe	Succeeded by William Jolliffe; Sir John Sinclair, Bt
Parliament of the United Kingdom
Preceded by Sir John Sinclair, Bt; William Jolliffe	Member of Parliament for Petersfield; 1802–1830; With: Sir John Sinclair, Bt to July 1802; William Best 1802–06; Hon. John Ward 1806–07; Booth Grey 1807–12; George Canning 1812; George Canning, junior 1812–20; Lord Hotham 1820; Sir Philip Musgrave, Bt 1820–25; James Lushington 1825–26; William Marshall 1826–30	Succeeded by William Jolliffe; Gilbert East Jolliffe
Preceded by William Jolliffe; Gilbert East Jolliffe	Member of Parliament for Petersfield; 1831–1832; With: William Jolliffe	Succeeded by John Shaw-Lefevre
Preceded by John Shaw-Lefevre	Member of Parliament for Petersfield; 1833–1835	Succeeded by Cornthwaite Hector
