= William Blamire =

English farmer and politician (1790–1862)

- Born: 13 April 1790; The Oaks, Dalston, Cumberland, England
- Died: 12 January 1862 (aged 71); Thackwood Nook, Inglewood Forest, Cumberland, England
- Education: Privately tutored; Westminster School; Christ Church, Oxford
- Occupations: Gentleman farmer; Whig politician
- Known for: High Sheriff of Cumberland; Member of Parliament for Cumberland and East Cumberland; Chief Tithe Commissioner
- Spouse: Dorothy Taubman (m. 1834)
- Relatives: Susanna Blamire (aunt); John Christian (uncle)

William Blamire (13 April 1790 – 12 January 1862) was an English gentleman farmer and Whig politician.

== Education ==
He was born, on 13 April 1790, at The Oaks, Dalston, Cumberland.

He was the eldest son of the naval surgeon and yeoman farmer William Blamire (1740 - 1814), and Jane Curwen (d. 1837) who was the third daughter of John Christian and the sister of the politician John Christian. The Romantic poet Susanna Blamire was his aunt.

He was baptised in Dalston by the philosopher William Paley, who was the vicar there, by whom he was privately tutored. From 1799 he was privately tutored by The Rev. John Fawcett at Carlisle. From 1805 to 1808, he was a King's Scholar at Westminster School, and, from 1808 to 1811, he was educated at Christ Church, Oxford, at which he took no degree.

He then attended John Christian Curwen's Schoose Farm on the same's Workington Hall estate, where he learned about animal husbandry, and became, according to the Carlisle Journal, ‘the very idol of the yeomanry; and his name a household word in every hamlet, dale and nook of Cumberland’.

== Career ==
Blamire was a Cumberland gentleman farmer who served as High Sheriff of Cumberland in 1828.

When he was elected to the House of Commons in 1831 as MP for Cumberland, he celebrated ‘the force of public opinion in destroying the magic spell of wealth and unconstitutional influence’ (Carlisle Journal) and welcomed support from ordinary clergymen who had forsaken normally tory loyalties. He said, ‘You will find no pluralist, no man who holds two livings in the list of Blue [which was the Whig colour in Cumberland] voters’.

His first constituency was abolished during 1832, after which he stood successfully for its replacement East Cumberland. Blamire resigned as Member of Parliament in 1836, when, after the passing of the Tithe Commutation Act 1836, he was appointed the first Chief Tithe Commissioner. The Commission reported in 1851 and provoked new acts and reforms. Sir Robert Peel was impressed with Blamire's industriousness and described him as ‘that indefatigable public servant’.

== Marriage ==
On 3 April 1834, Blamire married his cousin Dorothy, who was the youngest daughter of John Taubman of The Nunnery, Isle of Man, and the widow of Colonel Mark Wilks who had governed Saint Helena during the time of Napoleon's exile there. Blamire and his wife had no children.

They lived at Upper Harley Street, London. She died in 1857.

== Illness ==
Blamire suffered paralysis of his right arm from 1847, after which he required the assistance of two secretaries to take dictation. He resigned from all official duties in September 1860, when he received a pension from the lords of the Treasury.

He died at his property, Thackwood Nook, which is 4 miles south-east of Dalston and on the edge of Inglewood Forest, on 12 January 1862. He was buried on 18 January at Raughton Head churchyard, which is 1 mile north of his home.

Several months after his death, a prize in his name was established for achievements in agriculture.

== Notes ==
Parliament of the United Kingdom
| Preceded by Sir James Graham, Bt; John Lowther | Member of Parliament for Cumberland; 1831 – 1832; With: Sir James Graham, Bt | Constituency abolished |
| New constituency | Member of Parliament for East Cumberland; 1832 – 1836; With: Sir James Graham, Bt | Succeeded by Sir James Graham, Bt; William James |
