= Philip Howard (Whig politician) =

British politician

Philip Henry Howard (22 April 1801 – 1 January 1883), was a British Whig politician.

A member of the Howard family headed by the Duke of Norfolk, he was the son of Henry Howard, of Corby Castle, Cumberland, by Catherine Mary, daughter of Sir Richard Neave, 1st Baronet. He was a descendant of Lord William Howard, younger son of Thomas Howard, 4th Duke of Norfolk.

Howard was returned to parliament as one of two representatives for Carlisle in 1830. He lost his seat in July 1847 but the election was declared void in March 1848 and in that same month he was once again elected for the constituency. This time he held the seat until 1852. He was appointed High Sheriff of Cumberland for 1860–61.

Howard married Elizabeth, daughter of Major John Canning, in 1843. They lived at Corby Castle. Elizabeth died in February 1865. Howard remained a widower until his death in January 1883, aged 81.

Parliament of the United Kingdom
Preceded by James Law Lushington; Sir William Scott, Bt	Member of Parliament for Carlisle; 1830–1847; With: James Law Lushington 1830–1831; William James 1831–1835; William Marshall 1835–1847	Succeeded by John Dixon; William Nicholson Hodgson
Preceded by John Dixon; William Nicholson Hodgson	Member of Parliament for Carlisle; 1848–1852; With: William Nicholson Hodgson	Succeeded by Sir James Graham, Bt; Joseph Ferguson
