= Edmund Potter =

British industrialist and politician (1802–1883)

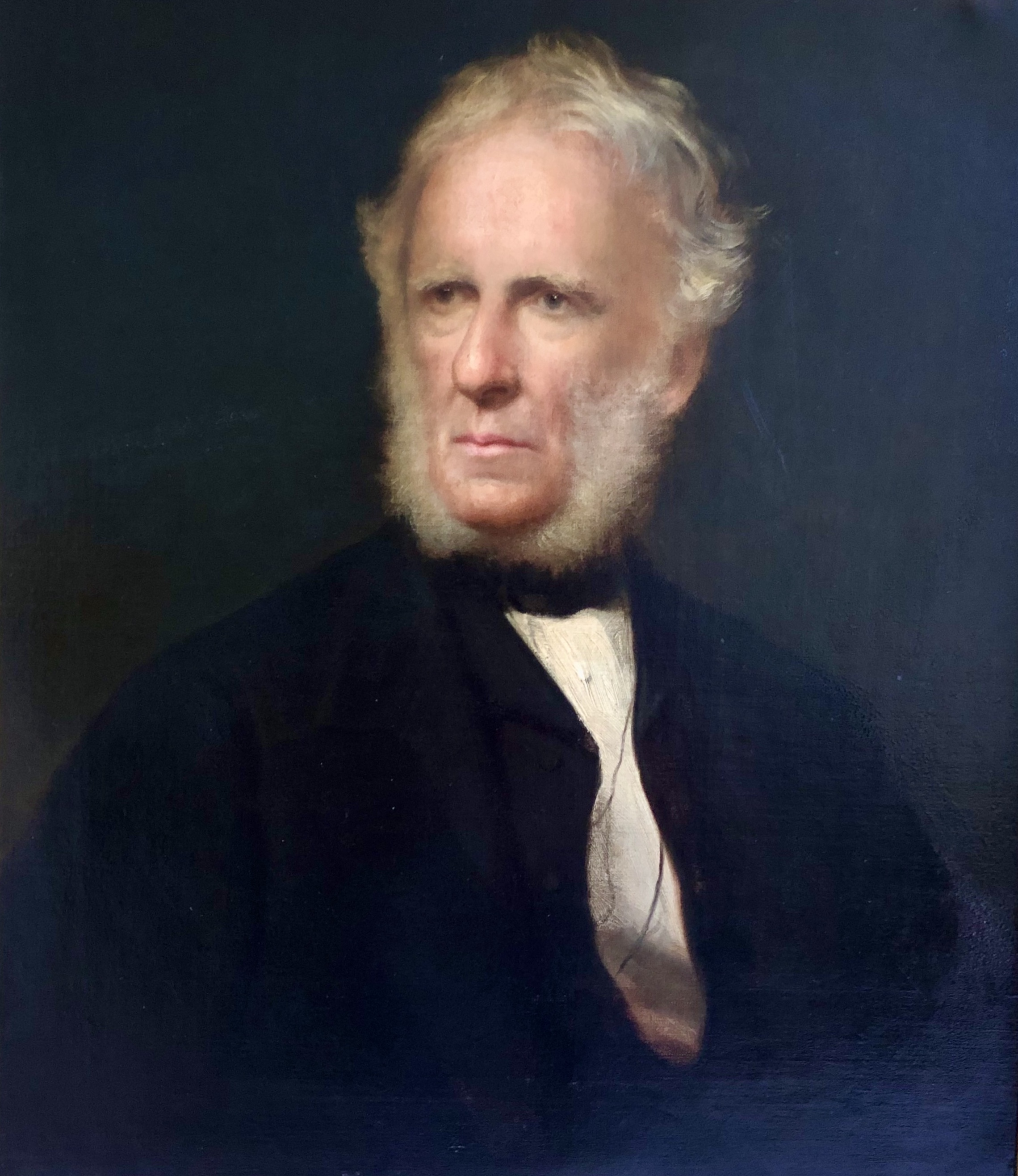
Edmund Potter as portrayed by Samuel Sidley

Edmund Potter (1802–1883) was an English politician and industrialist from Derbyshire. He was a businessman in Manchester, a Member of Parliament (MP) and a grandfather of the author Beatrix Potter.

He was a unitarian and, from 1861 to 1874, Liberal MP for Carlisle. Potter moved his business to Glossop in 1825, he rebuilt Joseph Lyne's Boggart Mill, and converted it to a printworks. He moved his family to Dinting Lodge in 1842. Originally calico printing was done by hand, but Potter introduced precision machine printing. By 1883, the mill employed 350, and had printed 1 million pieces on 42 machines. It was the world's largest calico printing factory.

== Family ==
James Potter (1710–1770) of Hindley was a flax merchant. He moved to New Market Place, Manchester. His son John Potter lived at rural Ardwick Green, Manchester, He married Catherine Eccles of Macclesfield. He visited America in 1794. They had three sons and two daughters. John, the first son, was a calico printer; James (2) was the third son. They lived in Ardwick Green.

Edmund Potter was the son of James (2). He lived with his wife Jessica Crompton of Lancaster, in Greenheys, Manchester.

Edmund was elected to membership of the Manchester Literary and Philosophical Society on 21 April 1826

In 1842 the couple moved to Dinting Lodge, Glossop. He was the first Edmund Potter of the Dinting Vale Printworks, which he ran with Charles Potter, the son of his uncle John. Later the partnership was dissolved and Charles moved to Darwen where he became a printer of wallpaper. Edmund had seven children and two are of note. Edmund (2) succeeded his father in the business in 1862, and Rupert became a barrister. Rupert's daughter Beatrix Potter was the famous children's author and illustrator.

== Calico printing ==
Calico used to be printed from wooden blocks, was heavily taxed and suffered from labour relation problems. Potter mechanised the process. He became the largest printer of calico in the world. The firm merged with other rival companies to form the Calico Printers' Association in 1899, which in 1948 printed 15,000 miles (24,000 km) of calico.

== Benevolence ==
Edmund Potter was a very strong believer that everyone should receive an education. In 1885 he built a reading room and library, well stocked with books and papers in his work's yard for his workers. When he bought the nearby Dinting Mill from the Wagstaffes, he used the upper floor as a dayschool for both boys and girls and for some of his young part-time workers. The lower floor was used to extract the black dye from logwood, and the mill subsequently became known as Logwood mill.

Parliament of the United Kingdom
Preceded by Sir James Graham, Bt; Wilfrid Lawson	Member of Parliament for Carlisle; 1861 – 1874; With: Wilfrid Lawson to 1865; William Nicholson Hodgson 1856–1868; Sir Wilfrid Lawson, Bt from 1868	Succeeded by Robert Ferguson; Sir Wilfrid Lawson, Bt
