= William Marshall (1796–1872) =

British politician

William Marshall (1796 – 16 May 1872) was a British politician.

He served as the Member of Parliament for Petersfield (1826–1830), for Leominster (1830–1831), for Beverley (1831–1832), for Carlisle (1835–1847), and for East Cumberland (1847–1868).

He was the eldest son of the wealthy industrialist John Marshall who introduced major innovations in flax spinning and built the celebrated Marshall's Mill and Temple Works in Leeds, West Yorkshire. Their family name may have inspired the character of Richard Marshall in the 1968 film Witchfinder General, which is set in that area during the English Civil War.

A sister, Julia Anne Elliott, was a hymnwriter; she married Henry Venn Elliott, who was the brother of Charlotte Elliott, another hymnwriter. William's younger brothers John and James Garth were both MPs for Leeds. The fourth brother, Henry Cowper, was Mayor of Leeds in 1842–1843. Marshall's daughter, Elizabeth Margaret, was the mother of the diplomat, Sir Cecil Spring Rice, who was also known as a hymnwriter.

Parliament of the United Kingdom
| Preceded by Hylton Jolliffe; James Lushington | Member of Parliament for Petersfield; 1826 – 1830; With: Hylton Jolliffe | Succeeded by Sir William Jolliffe, Bt, Gilbert East Jolliffe |
| Preceded by Lord Hotham; John Ward | Member of Parliament for Leominster; 1830 – 1831; With: Lord Hotham | Succeeded by William Bertram Evans; Thomas Brayen |
| Preceded by Henry Burton-Peters; Daniel Sykes | Member of Parliament for Beverley; 1831–1832; With: Henry Burton-Peters | Succeeded by Henry Burton-Peters; Charles Langdale |
| Preceded by Philip Howard; William James | Member of Parliament for Carlisle; 1835 – 1847; With: Philip Howard | Succeeded by William Nicholson Hodgson; John Dixon |
| Preceded by Hon. Charles Howard; William James | Member of Parliament for East Cumberland; 1847 – 1868; With: Hon. Charles Howard | Succeeded by Hon. Charles Howard; William Nicholson Hodgson |
