= Gilbert East Jolliffe =

Gilbert East Jolliffe was MP for Petersfield in 1830–1831.

Jolliffe was the eldest son of the Reverend William John Jolliffe and his wife Julia née Pytches. He served in the army until his election victory. His brother William was the 1st Baron Hylton.

Parliament of the United Kingdom
Preceded by Hylton Jolliffe; William Marshall	Member of Parliament for Petersfield; 1830–1831; With: William Jolliffe, 1st Baron Hylton	Succeeded by Hylton Jolliffe
