= John Dixon (1785–1857) =

British politician

Member of Parliament for Carlisle
- In office 30 July 1847 – 6 March 1848 Serving with William Nicholson Hodgson
- Preceded by: William Marshall; Philip Howard
- Succeeded by: William Nicholson Hodgson; Philip Howard

Personal details
- Born: 1785
- Died: 1857 (aged 71–72)
- Party: Whig

John Dixon (1785 – 1857) was a British Whig politician.

Dixon became a Whig Member of Parliament for Carlisle at the 1847 general election, but was the next year unseated due to "several acts of treating" at his election. Although he stood at the resulting by-election, he ranked third and was defeated.

Parliament of the United Kingdom
Preceded by William Marshall; Philip Howard	Member of Parliament for Carlisle; 1847–1848; With: William Nicholson Hodgson	Succeeded by William Nicholson Hodgson; Philip Howard
