= Sir Philip Musgrave, 8th Baronet =

English baronet and politician

Sir Philip Musgrave, 8th Baronet (12 July 1794 – 16 July 1827) was an English baronet and politician.

He was a Member of Parliament (MP) for Petersfield from 1820 to 1825, and for Carlisle from 1825 to 1827.

He succeeded to the baronetcy, of Hartley Castle, in 1806.

Parliament of the United Kingdom
Preceded by Hylton Jolliffe; The Lord Hotham	Member of Parliament for Petersfield; 1820–1825; With: Hylton Jolliffe	Succeeded by Hylton Jolliffe; James Lushington
Preceded by William James; Sir James Graham, Bt	Member of Parliament for Carlisle; 1825–1827; With: Sir James Graham, Bt	Succeeded by Sir James Graham, Bt; James Lushington
Baronetage of England
Preceded by John Chardin Musgrave	Baronet (of Hartley Castle); 1806–1827	Succeeded by Christopher John Musgrave
