= 1876 East Cumberland by-election =

UK Parliamentary by-election

The 1876 East Cumberland by-election was fought on 26 April 1876. The by-election was fought due to the death of the incumbent Conservative MP, William Nicholson Hodgson. It was won by the Liberal candidate Stafford Howard.

East Cumberland by-election, 1876
Party	Candidate	Votes	%	±%
Liberal	Stafford Howard	2,939	51.4	+15.5
Conservative	Mr. Musgrave	2,783	48.6	−15.5
Majority		156	2.8	N/A
Turnout		5,722	78.1	+1.0
Liberal gain from Conservative		Swing	+15.5	
