= Sir James Graham, 2nd Baronet =

British statesman (1792–1861)

The Right Honourable Sir James Graham Bt GCB
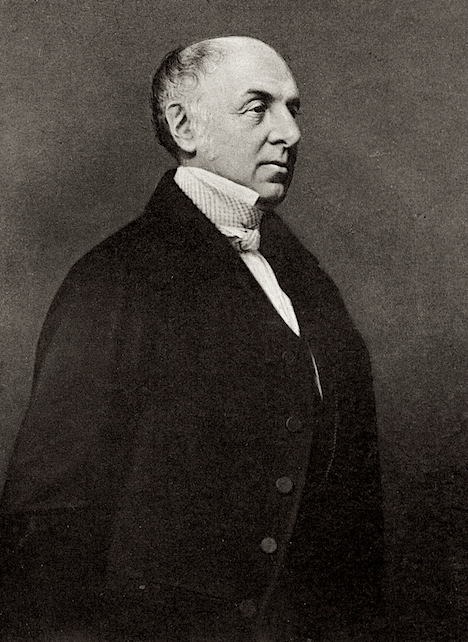

Home Secretary
- In office 6 September 1841 – 30 June 1846
- Monarch: Victoria
- Prime Minister: Sir Robert Peel
- Preceded by: The Marquess of Normanby
- Succeeded by: Sir George Grey

First Lord of the Admiralty
- In office 22 November 1830 – 7 June 1834
- Monarch: William IV
- Prime Minister: The Earl Grey
- Preceded by: The Viscount Melville
- Succeeded by: The Lord Auckland
- In office 30 December 1852 – 13 March 1855
- Monarch: Victoria
- Prime Minister: The Earl of Aberdeen; The Viscount Palmerston
- Preceded by: The Duke of Northumberland
- Succeeded by: Sir Charles Wood

Personal details
- Born: 1 June 1792 Naworth, Cumberland
- Died: 25 October 1861 (aged 69) Netherby, Cumberland
- Party: Whig (1818–1835); Conservative (1835–1846); Peelite (1846–1859); Liberal (1859–1861)
- Spouse: Frances Callander (d. 1857)
- Education: Christ Church, Oxford

Sir James Robert George Graham, 2nd Baronet, GCB, PC (1 June 1792 – 25 October 1861) was a British statesman, who notably served as Home Secretary and First Lord of the Admiralty. He was the eldest son of Sir James Graham, 1st Baronet, by Lady Catherine, eldest daughter of the 7th Earl of Galloway.

In 1819, he married Fanny Callander, youngest daughter of Sir James Campbell of Craigforth and Ardkinglas Castle. Sir James was created Doctor of Laws at the University of Cambridge in 1835, was Lord Rector of the University of Glasgow, 1840. He was First Lord of the Admiralty from 1830 to 1834 when he resigned on account of the government pressing for a reform of the Irish Church. He became Secretary of the Home Department from September 1841 to July 1846 and again First Lord of the Admiralty from December 1852 until February 1855. He was a member of the Council of the Duchy of Lancaster, and Deputy Lieutenant for county of Hertfordshire. He represented Kingston upon Hull from 1818 to 1820; for St Ives in 1820; for Carlisle from 1826 until 1829; for East Cumberland from 1830 until 1837; for Pembrokeshire District from 1838 until 1841; for Dorchester from 1841 until 1847; for Ripon from 1847 until July 1852; and was again returned for Carlisle from 1852 until his death in 1861. Graham Land in Antarctica is named after him.

== Background and education ==
Graham was born at Naworth, Cumberland, the son of Sir James Graham, 1st Baronet, by his wife Lady Catherine, daughter of John Stewart, 7th Earl of Galloway. He was taught at a private school at Dalston in Cumberland, kept by the Rev. Walter Fletcher, before attending Westminster School and Christ Church, Oxford. He left Oxford after two years and while travelling for his pleasure abroad, he took up a position of private secretary to Lord Montgomerie, British diplomat in Sicily, during the period of the Napoleonic Wars. When Montgomerie became ill the responsibility for the mission fell on Graham. When Lord William Bentinck returned to the Embassy he agreed that Graham should retain the post. During this time he conducted the negotiations which led to the separation of Joachim Murat from Napoleon. When the war ended he returned to England. Back in London he became friends with Wilfrid Lawson, who went on to join Graham in politics. Lawson also became Graham's brother-in-law and father to Sir Wilfrid Lawson, 2nd Baronet, of Brayton.

== Early political career ==
=== Whig beginnings ===
Back in London, Graham immersed himself in political affairs. Although his father was a staunch Tory he made his headquarters in Brooks's Club where he made many Whig contacts. On 10 June 1818 he announced that he would contest the mercantile borough of Hull. Known at the time as the Yorkshire Dandy on account of his fine appearance and flowery speech, he stood on the Whig doctrine of Parliamentary reform, the abolition of unnecessary positions and pensions, peace, retrenchment, the abolition of the slave trade, and religious and civil liberties. After three days of open voting and official scrutiny, Graham entered parliament as the junior member by a mere four votes. However, he had gained the seat at great personal expense and notwithstanding other donations accrued a debt of £6,000. In January 1820, George IV succeeded thus forcing a dissolution of parliament. As a result of his past support for radical measures he failed to gain the necessary support to retain the Yorkshire seat and in consequence he stood and won the Cornish seat of St Ives, heading the poll with 205 votes. At Westminster, Graham maintained his campaign for economy, generally opposing the Government's proposed increase in the Royal Family's Civil List. However his parliamentary career, although undistinguished, now became brief: when charged with bribing the electorate he resigned rather than contest an expensive suit.

=== Agricultural improver ===
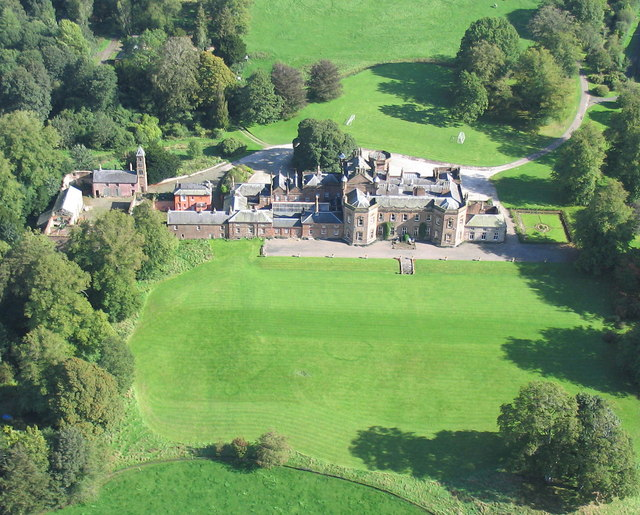
Netherby Hall

Graham returned to Cumberland and began a programme of improving the family estate at Netherby, with the intention that such improvements would benefit both the landowner and the tenant. He began with a one-off gesture, wiping out the arrears of his tenants debts. He reduced the number of small uneconomic farms on the estate; he rebuilt the cottages and farm-buildings, introduced tile drains whereby much marshy land was reclaimed, and improved the breed of stock on the estate, spending in excess of £100,000 over a twenty-year period. He eventually studied the Corn Laws and their effects upon the community, publishing his conclusions in a pamphlet of 114 pages entitled "Corn and Currency", which brought him into prominence as a man of advanced Liberal opinions. He argued that liberal economics rather than protection would best serve the interests of the landowners. High duties on foreign corn had failed to help British agriculture and should be cut to a level where they simply balanced the landowner's taxes and rates. Whereas high prices increased rents to the benefit of the landowners they conferred no advantage to the labourer and were an injury to the productive and a tax on the unproductive classes of the community. His general conclusions were in favour of free trade and free banking. He was also a founder member of the Society for the Prevention of Cruelty to Animals (later RSPCA).

On 8 July 1819, Graham married Frances ("Fanny") Callander, of Craigforth and Ardkinglas, a famous society beauty. In 1824 he succeeded to the baronetcy.

== In Parliament ==
=== Representative for Cumberland ===
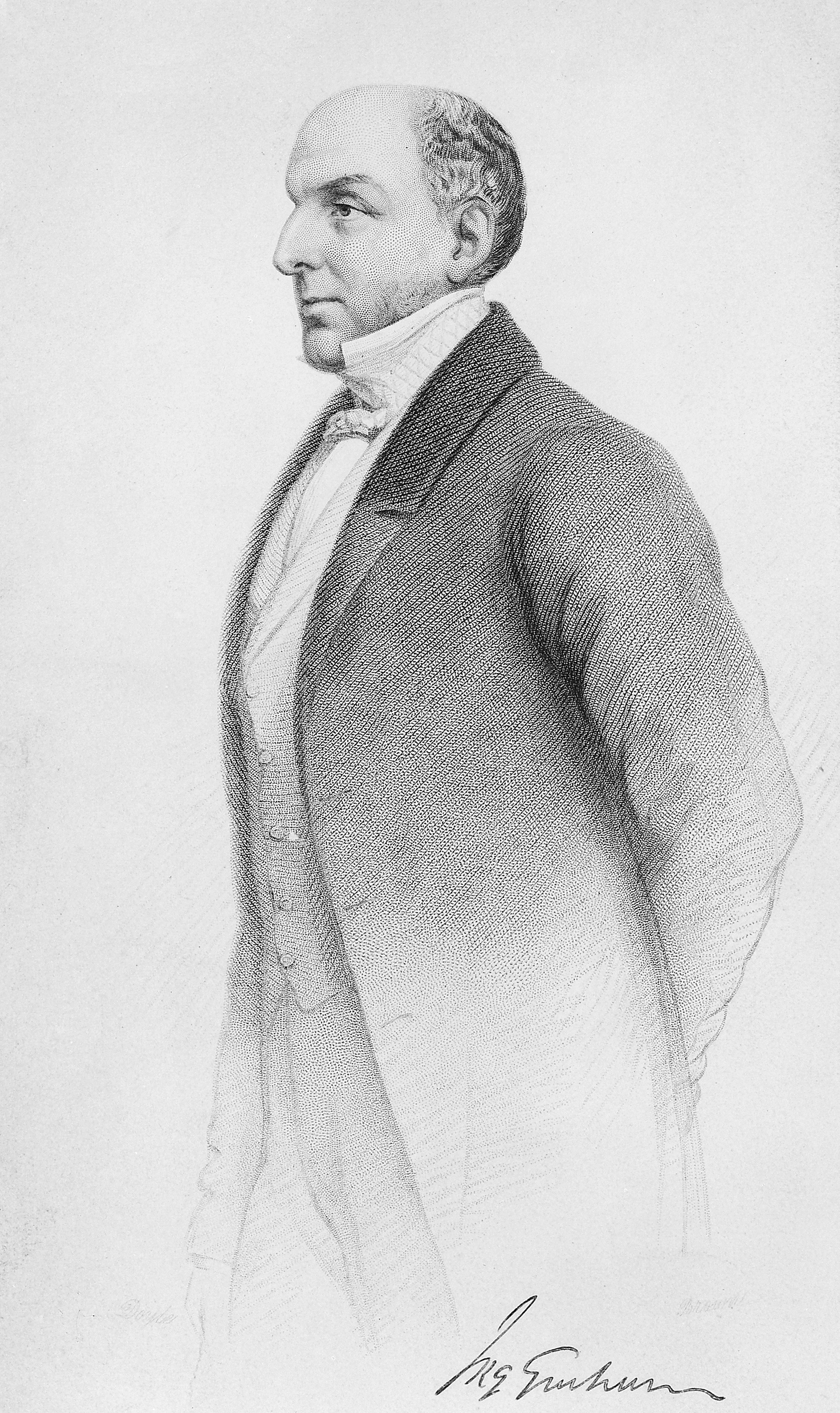
Sir James Graham

At the general election of 1826, Graham, who stood upon principles identical to those advocated when contesting Hull, became the senior member for the city of Carlisle. It was a remarkable contest. When Sir Philip Musgrave, 8th Baronet (1794–1827), the Tory candidate, ventured into one of the poorest districts of the city, he was confronted by a group of non-electors seeking his opinions relating to the Corn Laws. When his views failed to meet with their approval he received a storm of abuse followed by a shower of stones, and a general disturbance ensued. Members of the corporation and the constabulary were man-handled and thrown into the Milldam. In the course of the afternoon a detachment of the 55th regiment of Foot appeared to quell the disturbance. The mob received the troops with a volley of stones, the troops reacted with a hail of ball cartridges and when the smoke cleared two young women lay dead and numerous others lay wounded. In 1828, the death of John Christian Curwen caused a vacancy in the representation of the county of Cumberland. As a result, Graham resigned his seat and entered parliament in an uncontested election on their behalf. In 1830 the celebrated "Dalston Dinner" took place, a public dinner given to Graham by a number of the freeholders of the county in testimony of their approbation of his conduct in parliament. During the proceedings Graham declared himself a "party man" under the Blue flag of freedom; declaring.

I became a Blue, Blue I am, Blue I have always been, and Blue I trust I shall ever continue to be; I am not ashamed to own it, and God forbid the Blues shall ever have cause to be ashamed of me ... The Tories are a "Court Party" aiming at the advancement of kingly power, while the Whigs, the "Country Party", fought to uphold popular rights, defend popular feelings, and forward the happiness of the people.

At the end of July, following the dissolution of parliament, Graham and Sir John Lowther both returned for Cumberland. In 1830 he first made a name in the House of Commons by a motion for the reduction of official salaries, and he increased his reputation by an attack on the salaries received by privy councillors. This gave him a position as one of the more advanced reformers, and in November Earl Grey offered him the post of First Lord of the Admiralty. He was also sworn of the Privy Council. Although this precipitated the need for a new election he was returned unopposed. Graham later became a member of the committee, along with Lord Durham, Lord Duncannon and Lord John Russell charged with the task of compiling and introducing the Reform Act 1832. From 1832 to 1837 he sat for the eastern division of the county of Cumberland.

== First Lord of the Admiralty ==
=== Break with Whiggism ===
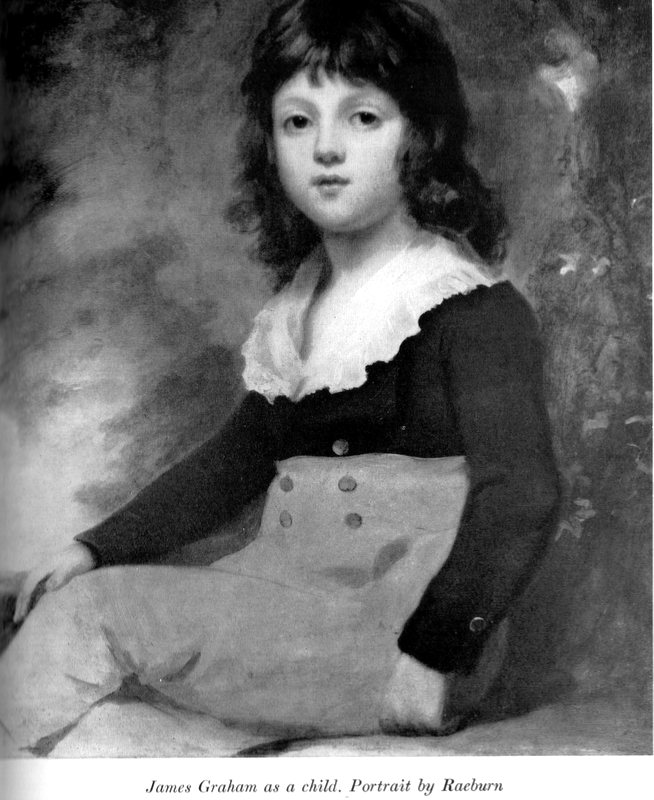
Sir James Graham as a child

By the summer of 1834, Graham had become a successful minister, the navy was reformed, apart from impressments, and seamen's conditions had improved. The Reform Act was assured, and European peace secured. All was well except in Ireland where the unfair system of raising tithes for the church and the problems relating to land tenure prevailed. The discontent of the Irish Catholic majority was strong enough to prevent the collection of tithes to support an antagonistic and as they believed heretical church. Parliament proposed that all compositions for tithes should cease, and that an annual land tax should be paid, out of which provision should be made for the clergy and other tithe owners. As such in 1833, the British Government introduced the Irish Church Temporalities Bill which proposed the administrative and financial restructuring of the Church. The bill sought to reduce the number of both bishoprics and archbishoprics from 22 to 12, to change the structure of the leases of Church lands and to apply the revenues saved by these changes for the use of parishes. Since Graham believed that the union of the two countries principally rested on the church and that any meddling with the establishment would inevitably lead to its downfall he resigned from the government. He did not act alone, Lord Stanley, Lord Ripon and the Duke of Richmond also tendered their resignations. He now became a member of the Derby Dilly. In January 1835, notwithstanding criticism from significant parts of the Cumbrian electorate, Graham reassured his supporters that he still favoured peace, retrenchment and reform and in consequence he was returned unopposed at the general election. On 30 June that year Graham crossed the floor of the House and henceforth sat on the Tory side. Graham now joined the Cumberland Conservative Association, and forsook the Carlisle Journal in favour of the Carlisle Patriot.

== Cumberland rejection ==
Graham's conduct in Parliament alienated many of his traditional Whig supporters. In 1837, upon the death of William IV and the announcement of a general election, a requisition signed by over 2,500 county freeholders sought the election of two alternative Whig candidates. On the day of the election, freeholders flocked from every part of the division to offer support for the reform candidates. The cavalcade of horsemen, four abreast, many of whom had ridden many miles that morning, stretched over half a mile. Flags and banner, advertising the disapproval of Graham, flew profusely, many of them bearing skits relating to Graham's past conduct. On the hustings, Graham found it difficult to obtain a hearing, and in consequence he submitted to his opponents' cries. At the close of the poll the numbers were: for Francis Aglionby 2,294; for William James 2,124; for Graham 1,505. This ended Graham's influence in his home county.

== Home Secretary ==
=== Entry to government ===
In 1838, Sir John Owen, 1st Baronet ordered his son Hugh Owen, MP for Pembroke in Wales, to resign and make way for Graham. Graham won the resulting by-election unopposed and so re-entered Parliament. In 1838 he was elected Rector of the University of Glasgow, an award quickly followed with the Freedom of the same city.

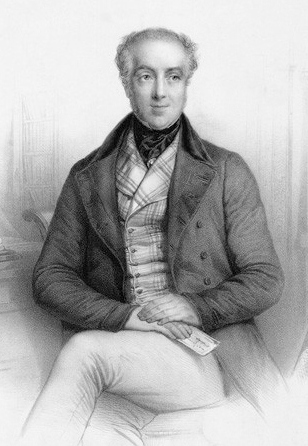
Sir James Graham, 1842

However, Graham's tenure in Pembroke was short-lived. In the 1841 general election, Sir John Owen chose to reclaim Pembroke; Graham felt honour-bound to comply and did not stand. Instead, Robert Williams, MP for Dorchester, stood down in favor of Graham, who was elected unopposed there. Sir Robert Peel became Prime Minister and appointed Graham Home Secretary in his cabinet.

In 1842 Graham tried to improve state education in the industrial districts by replacing the existing Factories Act 1833. The 1833 act limited children under 13 to an eight-hour day and provided for two hours of daily compulsory education. Graham's new Factories Bill limited children aged between 8 and 13 to a 6.5 hour workday, with 3.5 hours of education, and women and young persons to a maximum of 12 hours work each day. However, a disagreement between the Anglicans and the Dissenters forced a withdrawal of the measure. Graham re-introduced the bill on 7 March 1843, Northern reformers expressed a hatred for Graham; after a fierce parliamentary battle, the bill finally received royal assent after both Peel and Graham threatened to resign.

As Home Secretary he incurred considerable odium in Scotland, by his unconciliating policy on the church question prior to the Disruption of 1843.

=== Mazzini letters ===
In June 1844, Thomas Slingsby Duncombe brought Parliament's attention to an event where certain letters addressed to a foreign refugee had been opened and copied in the course of transmission through the London Post Office under the warrant of Graham at the Home Office. The letters from Emilio and Attilo Bandiera (residing at the time in Corfu) to Giuseppe Mazzini, an Italian freedom fighter, disclosed their intention to take part in an armed insurrection upon the coast at Calabria. Duncombe suggested that the Foreign Office had then passed the information to the Neapolitan court through a link with the Austrian authorities. When the group landed at the pre-arranged place, they were instantly killed. Although a secret committee convened at Parliament's request exonerated the government, the discussion was renewed in the following session, after Richard Lalor Sheil censured the government for its actions. Graham vigorously defended his actions, stating that the Secretary of State had been invested by Parliament with the power, in certain cases, of issuing warrants directing letters to be opened. The division took place in a very thin house and the government survived by a mere 16 votes. The events haunted Graham for the rest of his life; as he told his nephew, "he knew, when he was gone, none of his reforms would be recollected, but that he would only be remembered as the man who opened the letters of the Italians."

=== Free trade ===
Notwithstanding his apparent support for a degree of relaxation in the Corn Law legislation as stated 'Corn and Currency', Graham remained hostile to major reform. In 1839, he argued that repeal would ruin British agriculture; he supported protection and defended a fixed duty. He supported William Huskisson's policy in 1828, he drew up the 1833 report, supported the continuation of the Corn Laws in 1834, and opposed Lord John Russell's fixed duty plan in 1836. However, by 1842 his hard line approach had begun to soften. Henceforth he played a leading role in planning a policy which began by including the introduction of a sliding scale for a levy on the price of corn, the reintroduction of income tax, and a massive change in overall tariffs. Old prohibitions were removed and duties on raw, partly manufactured and fully made imports were limited to a maximum of 5, 12 and 20 per cent. It was argued that the loss occasioned by reducing duties on 769 of some 1200 durable articles would be covered by increased trade and production. In 1843, Graham admitted to the Commons that 'free Trade' principles were the principles of common sense. In 1845, with Graham's support, 430 of the remaining 813 dutiable articles were freed, and other duties lowered, all export taxes abolished, payments on raw cotton and glass ended and timber and sugar preferences modified. In early 1846, Peel proposed, in a three-hour speech, that the Corn Laws would be abolished on 1 February 1849, after three years of gradual reductions of the tariff, leaving only a 1 shilling duty per quarter. Benjamin Disraeli and Lord George Bentinck emerged as the most forceful opponents of repeal in Parliamentary debates, arguing that repeal would weaken landowners socially and politically and therefore destroy the 'territorial constitution' of Britain by empowering commercial interests. On the third reading of Peel's Bill of Repeal (Importation Act 1846) on 15 May, MPs voted 327 votes to 229 (a majority of 98) to repeal the Corn Laws. On 25 June the Duke of Wellington persuaded the House of Lords to pass it. On that same night Graham's Preservation of Life Bill (Irish Coercion) was defeated in the Commons by 292 to 219 by 'a combination of Whigs, Radicals, and Tory protectionists'. On 29 June Peel resigned as Prime Minister. As a result, the Conservative Party divided and the Whigs formed a government with Russell as Prime Minister. Those Conservatives who were loyal to Peel became known as the Peelites, they included Graham, the Earl of Aberdeen and William Ewart Gladstone.

== Peelite ==
In the 1847 general election, the Ripon constituency returned Graham unopposed. He had resigned from the Carlton Club, and although he received offers of cabinet positions from both sides of the political spectrum, he remained loyal to Peel and hostile to any reversal of Free Trade legislation. He saw the repeal of the Navigation Acts as a vital step in the liberal march, protection or no protection was the battlefield between reaction and progress. After Peel's untimely death, Graham and Aberdeen became the unofficial leaders of the 100 conservative members who had supported free trade. However Graham had lost the support of the influential men who controlled the Ripon seat and while he contemplated his next move a reacquisition arrived from Carlisle, in which almost 500 electors had promised support. On 7 July 1852, Graham returned in triumph at the head of the poll. At the victory dinner, Graham mocked protection calling it 'outdoor relief to distressed landlords', he also reaffirmed is support for restrained reform. In December that year the Tory government resigned and Lord Aberdeen became prime minister of a Whig, Peelite, Radical, Liberal alliance. Graham now returned to the Cabinet as First Lord of the Admiralty. Shortly afterwards the Eastern Question raised its ugly head and within weeks Britain and France drifted into the Crimean War with Russia. Graham ordered the fleet to sail through the Dardanelles and eventually into the Black Sea. In April 1854, Queen Victoria recognised Graham services by awarding him the Civil Grand Cross of the Order of the Bath. However, once installed notwithstanding previously stating that "If driven to war, he was for waging it with the utmost vigour and inflicting as much injury as they could on Russia" the naval action stalled and the war dragged on. Graham was responsible for the choice of Sir Charles Napier to command the fleet in the Baltic. Sir Charles did not relish the inactivity to which he was reduced by the strength of the fortresses of Kronstadt and Sveaborg, which he was forbidden to attack, except in conjunction with the French fleet. The French refused to join in the attempt, and Sir Charles loudly complained on his return of his treatment by the admiralty. It does not seem that Graham was to blame; the shutting up of the Russian fleet was a service of sufficient importance without the glory of an attack upon fortresses which would have cost much bloodshed without an adequate return. On 29 January 1855, John Arthur Roebuck carried a motion demanding an inquiry into the conduct of the war and three weeks later Aberdeen and Graham tendered their resignations.

In 1857, Graham opposed Lord Palmerston's Gunboat diplomacy when bombarding Canton after the Chinese authority's seized the Lorcha Arrow. Notwithstanding the unpopularity of this decision he was returned in the election at Carlisle. However, the Peelite party had been routed, to all intent it was no more. He contested Carlisle again in 1859, where with his nephew their joint election went against the general trend and returned two liberal candidates. Later that year a group of 280 like minded members, including Graham and Lawson, met in Willis's Rooms to form the Liberal Party. A two party system had returned to British politics.

On 25 October 1861, Graham died, exactly four years after the death of his wife.

== Orator ==
Graham was as a speaker exceedingly polished, but tended to pomposity, and carried the habit of quotation to inordinate lengths. His speeches were enlivened by epigrams and by passages of splendid rhetoric; but their construction was always artificial. He is remembered as an orator for a number of brilliant sayings rather than for any great speech. He never succeeded in getting outside himself and identifying himself with his audience. Similarly his political judgment was too much swayed by personal considerations, and he said of himself: 'In a party sense it must be owned that mine has been a devious career.' He was too self-conscious in all that he did to be a great statesman; but he was an impressive personality in the House of Commons, and was an able administrator. Where he failed he failed not through want of foresight or political intelligence, but through a defect of personal sympathy.

== Retrospective ==
At the time of his death the Oxford dandy, the amateur diplomat, and the glamorous parliamentarian had served in many fields, and become an important force in the creation of Victorian Britain. But what did Graham think of his own achievements? In 1852, he reminded the Carlisle electorate of his past achievements:

I helped, when out of office, to secure for a large body of my fellow subjects in the United Kingdom a perfect equality of civil rights without regard to religious distinction. In the service of the crown I helped to emancipate the slaves in the British dominions, and to wash away that great reproach from British freedom by emancipating the Negroes in our colonies. In office along with Lord Grey and Lord John Russell I was entrusted with the preparation of the Reform Act, and on that occasion I had the good fortune greatly to extend the popular rights of my fellow citizens. In power I was a party to the issuing of that commission of inquiry from which emanated the great measure of municipal reform that established the principle of self-government in the corporations of the kingdom. Then, I am sure there is not a popular assembly in the kingdom in which the name I am about to mention will not be received with silence and respect, in conjunction with my departed friend Sir Robert Peel. I contributed greatly to supply the people of this country with cheap food, absolutely to repeal the duties on raw materials of manufacture, thus cheapening the price of food and clothing to the poor and needy. Still more I did my best, and not unsuccessfully, to establish peace in Europe on a rock of safety, by leading to those amicable relations with all the foreign powers, which free trade and extended commerce never fail to bring in their train. Before I left office I prepared the County Courts Bills, and gave it to my successor, and almost without any change that bill became the law of the land. The other day, when out of office, unbought, and without any personal object, I devoted almost the whole of my time to a commission to inquire into the abuse of the Court of Chancery, from which has emanated that measure of Chancery reform for which Lord Derby's Government takes so much credit.

His nephew offered a fitting tribute:

It seemed to me that Sir James Graham's actions, often wrong no doubt, were ever actuated by a deesire for his country's and not for his own, advancement, and what higher credit can there be for a statesman? I believe he was the principal factor (after Cobden and Bright in converting Sir Robert Peel to Free Trade, the only great political reform which in my day has been an absolute and complete success. I have heard Mr Bright say that he was one of the cleverest men whom he ever met.

== Family ==
Graham married Frances ("Fanny") Callander, of Craigforth and Ardkinglas, a famous society beauty, on 8 July 1819. She died in October 1857. Graham died at Netherby, Cumberland, on 25 October 1861, aged 69, and was succeeded in the baronetcy by his son, Frederick. His other children include: Constance Helena Graham, Mabel Violet (wife of William Duncombe, 1st Earl of Feversham), Rev. Reginald Malise Graham, Helen Graham and James Stanley Graham.

He was godfather to James Graham Goodenough (who was named after him).

Parliament of the United Kingdom
Preceded by John Staniforth; George Denys	Member of Parliament for Kingston upon Hull; 1818–1820; With: John Mitchell	Succeeded by John Mitchell; Daniel Sykes
Preceded by Sir Walter Stirling; Samuel Stephens	Member of Parliament for St Ives; 1820–1821; With: Lyndon Evelyn	Succeeded by Lyndon Evelyn; Sir Christopher Hawkins
Preceded by William James; Sir Philip Musgrave	Member of Parliament for Carlisle; 1826–1829; With: Sir Philip Musgrave 1826–1827; James Law Lushington 1827–1829	Succeeded by James Law Lushington; Sir William Scott
Preceded by Sir John Lowther; John Cristian Curwen	Member of Parliament for Cumberland; 1829–1832; With: Sir John Lowther 1829–1831; William Blamire 1831–1832	constituency divided
New constituency	Member of Parliament for East Cumberland; 1832–1837; With: William Blamire 1832–1836; William James 1836–1837	Succeeded by William James; Francis Aglionby
Preceded by Hugh Owen Owen	Member of Parliament for Pembroke; 1838–1841	Succeeded by Sir John Owen
Preceded by Henry Ashley; Robert Williams	Member of Parliament for Dorchester; 1841–1847; With: Henry Ashley	Succeeded by George Lionel Dawson-Damer; Henry Sturt
Preceded by Sir George Cockburn; Edwin Lascelles	Member of Parliament for Ripon; 1847–1852; With: Edwin Lascelles	Succeeded by Edwin Lascelles; William Beckett
Preceded by William Nicholson Hodgson; Philip Henry Howard	Member of Parliament for Carlisle; 1852–1861; With: Joseph Ferguson 1852–1857; William Nicholson Hodgson 1857–1859; Wilfrid Lawson 1859–1861	Succeeded by Edmund Potter; Wilfrid Lawson
Political offices
Preceded by The Viscount Melville	First Lord of the Admiralty; 1830–1834	Succeeded by The Lord Auckland
Preceded by The Marquess of Normanby	Home Secretary; 1841–1846	Succeeded by Sir George Grey
Preceded by The Duke of Northumberland	First Lord of the Admiralty; 1852–1855	Succeeded by Sir Charles Wood
Academic offices
Preceded by Robert Peel	Rector of the University of Glasgow; 1838–1840	Succeeded by Marquess of Breadalbane
Baronetage of Great Britain
Preceded by James Graham	Baronet (of Netherby); 1824–1861	Succeeded by Frederick Graham
