= George Howard, Baron Howard of Henderskelfe =

British landowner, soldier and media man

Major The Right Honourable The Lord Howard of Henderskelfe JP

Personal details
- Born: 22 May 1920 Belgravia, London, England
- Died: 27 November 1984 (aged 64)
- Spouse: Cecilia FitzRoy (m. 1949)
- Children: 4
- Parent: Geoffrey Howard (father)
- Relatives: Christian Howard (sister); George Howard (grandfather); Paul Methuen (grandfather)
- Military career
- Rank: Major
- Unit: Green Howards
- Wars: World War II

Major George Anthony Geoffrey Howard, Baron Howard of Henderskelfe, JP (22 May 1920 – 27 November 1984) was a British landowner, soldier, and peer from the aristocratic Howard family. He inherited Castle Howard, in Henderskelfe, Yorkshire, which he successfully preserved. Though much of his career was spent devoted to regional affairs, he served as Chairman of the BBC from 1980 to 1983.

== Early life ==
Howard was born at 32 Chester Square, Belgravia, one of five children of Hon. Geoffrey Howard and Hon. Ethel Christian Methuen. He was a grandson of the 9th Earl of Carlisle and the 3rd Baron Methuen. His elder sister was Anglican theologian Dame Christian Howard (1916–1999).

He was educated at Eton and Balliol College, Oxford.

Howard fought in the Second World War with the Green Howards, being wounded in Burma. Both his brothers were killed in action in 1944.

== Career ==
In 1952, Howard was appointed to the office of Justice of the Peace for Yorkshire.

He was chairman of the Board of Governors of the BBC from 1980 to 1983 after being a governor for eight years. Notably, this was during the Jimmy Savile scandal. He was made a life peer 1 July 1983 with the title Baron Howard of Henderskelfe, of Henderskelfe in the County of North Yorkshire.

== Personal life ==
Howard married Lady Cecilia Blanche Genevieve FitzRoy (born 13 May 1922, died 1974), a daughter of Alfred FitzRoy, 8th Duke of Grafton, on 11 May 1949. They had four sons:

- Hon. Henry Francis Geoffrey Howard (17 March 1950 –17 April 2008). He was unmarried.
- Hon. Nicholas Paul Geoffrey Howard (born 25 April 1952), married, firstly, in 1983, to Amanda Nimmo, daughter of the actor Derek Nimmo. They divorced in 1990. He married, secondly, in 1992, to Victoria Barnsley. Both marriages resulted in children, a boy and a girl, respectively.
- Hon. Simon Bartholomew Geoffrey Howard (26 January 1956 – 27 February 2022), married, firstly (in 1983; divorced 2000), Annette Smallwood. Married, secondly, in 2001, Rebecca Sieff. Twins, Octavia and Merlin, were born in 2002.
- Hon. Anthony Michael Geoffrey Howard (born 18 May 1958), married firstly Linda McGrady in 1985. Two daughters were born of this marriage before they divorced in 1997. Married, secondly, Deborah Ayrton-Grime in 2002.

Howard owned Castle Howard in North Yorkshire, which was used as the setting of the fictional Brideshead Castle in the Granada miniseries Brideshead Revisited (1981) and the 2008 film.

He died from cancer.

Media offices
Preceded by Michael Swann	Chairman of the BBC Board of Governors; 1980–1983	Succeeded by Stuart Young
