= Samuel Sidley =

English portrait painter (1829–1896)

Samuel Sidley (1829–1896) was an English portrait painter.

== Life ==
Samuel Sidley, born in Yorkshire in 1829, first studied art in the school of art at Manchester. Subsequently he came to London and was admitted to the schools of the Royal Academy. In 1855 he exhibited for the first time at the Royal Academy, sending An Ancient Mariner. He became chiefly known as a successful portrait-painter, and gained frequent commissions for official and presentation portraits. Among these were portraits of Professor Fawcett, Bishop Colenso (presented by his family to the National Portrait Gallery), Lady Brassey, the Duke and Duchess of Buckingham, and other persons of note. He also painted some subject pictures, of which Alice in Wonderland, The Challenge, and a few others, were engraved and met with some popularity. Sidley continued to paint up to the time of his death, which took place at 8 Victoria Road, Kensington, on 9 July 1896. He was a member of the Royal Society of British Artists, and an original associate of the Royal Cambrian Academy.

== Gallery ==
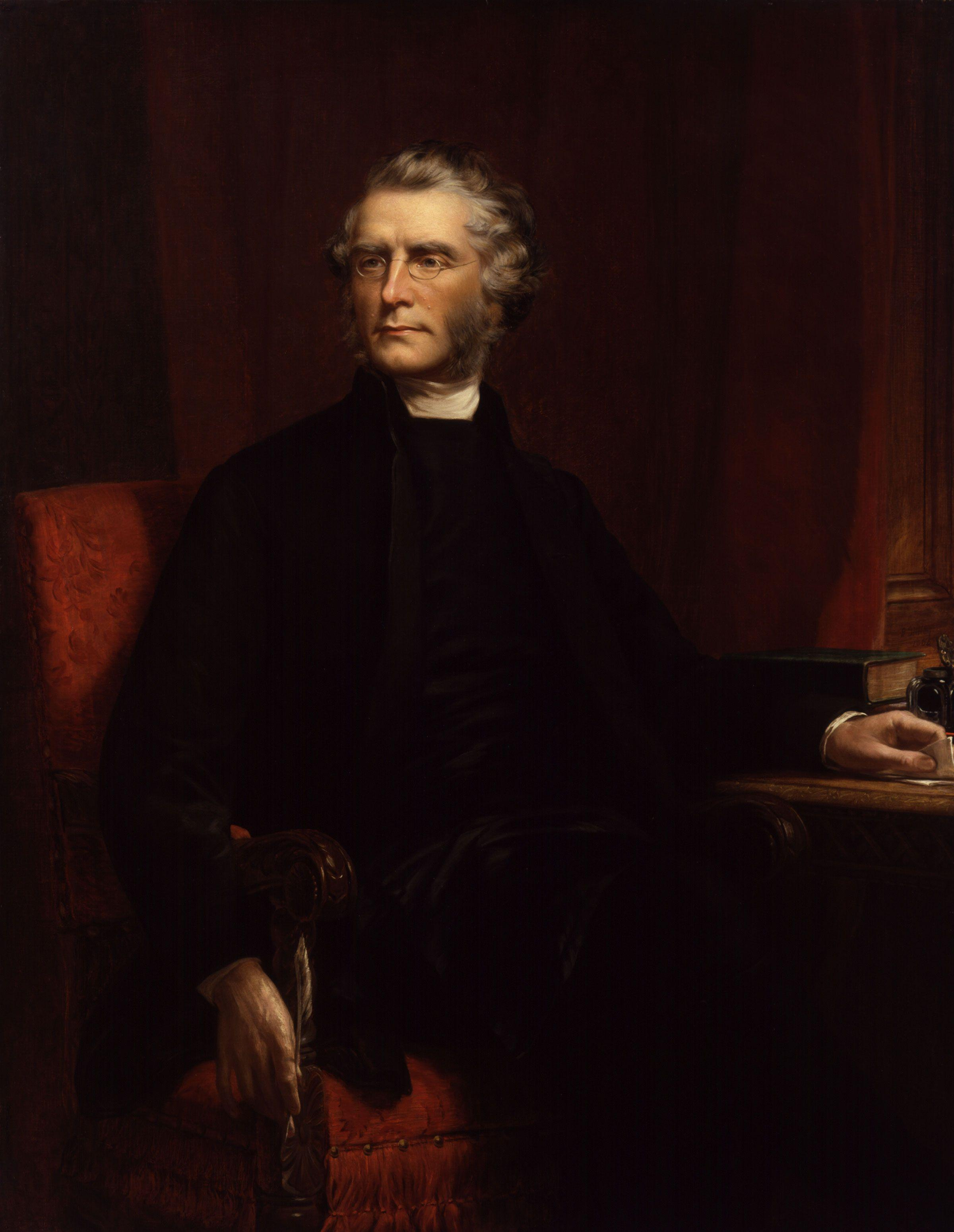
John William Colenso (1866)

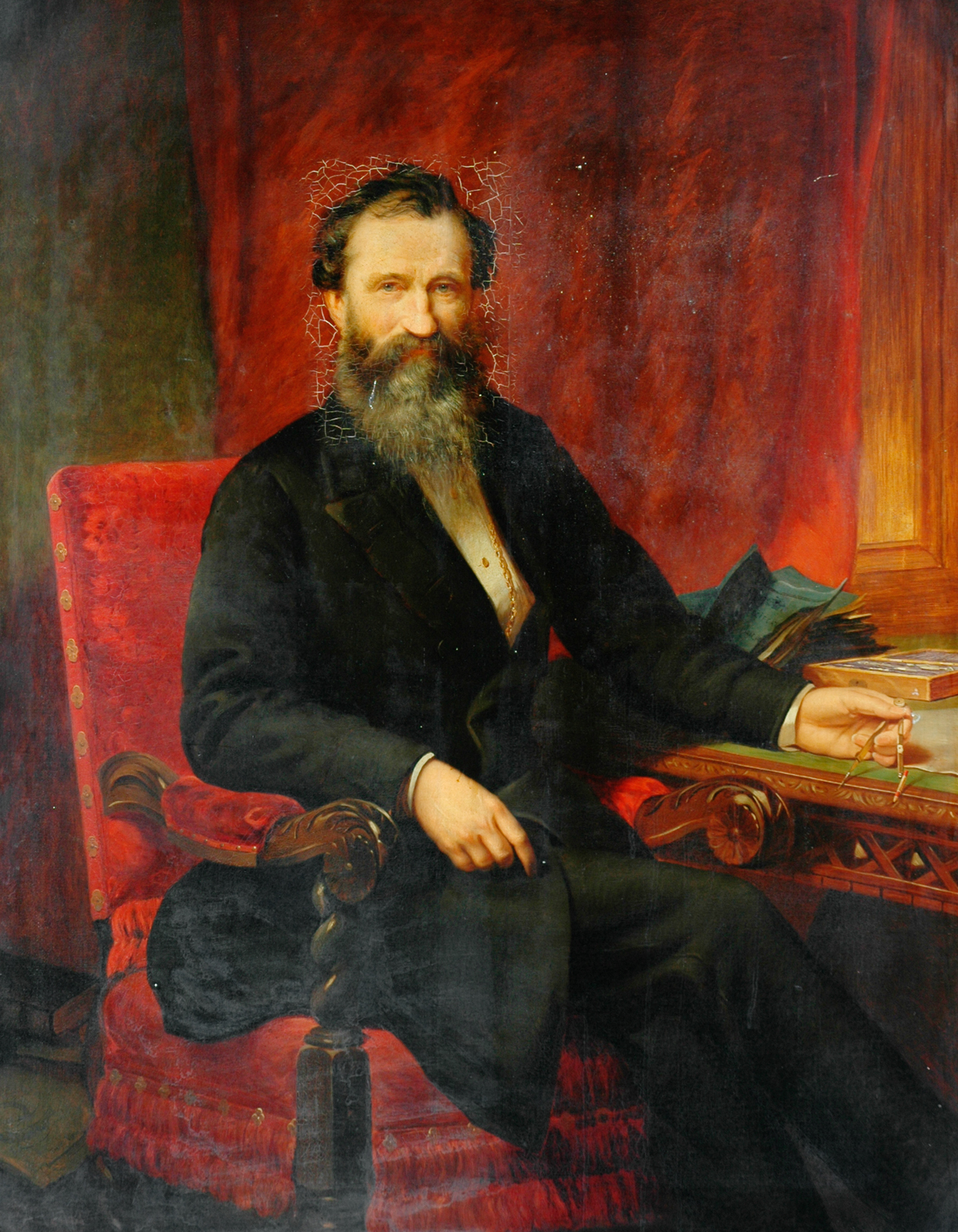
Isaac Holden (1868)

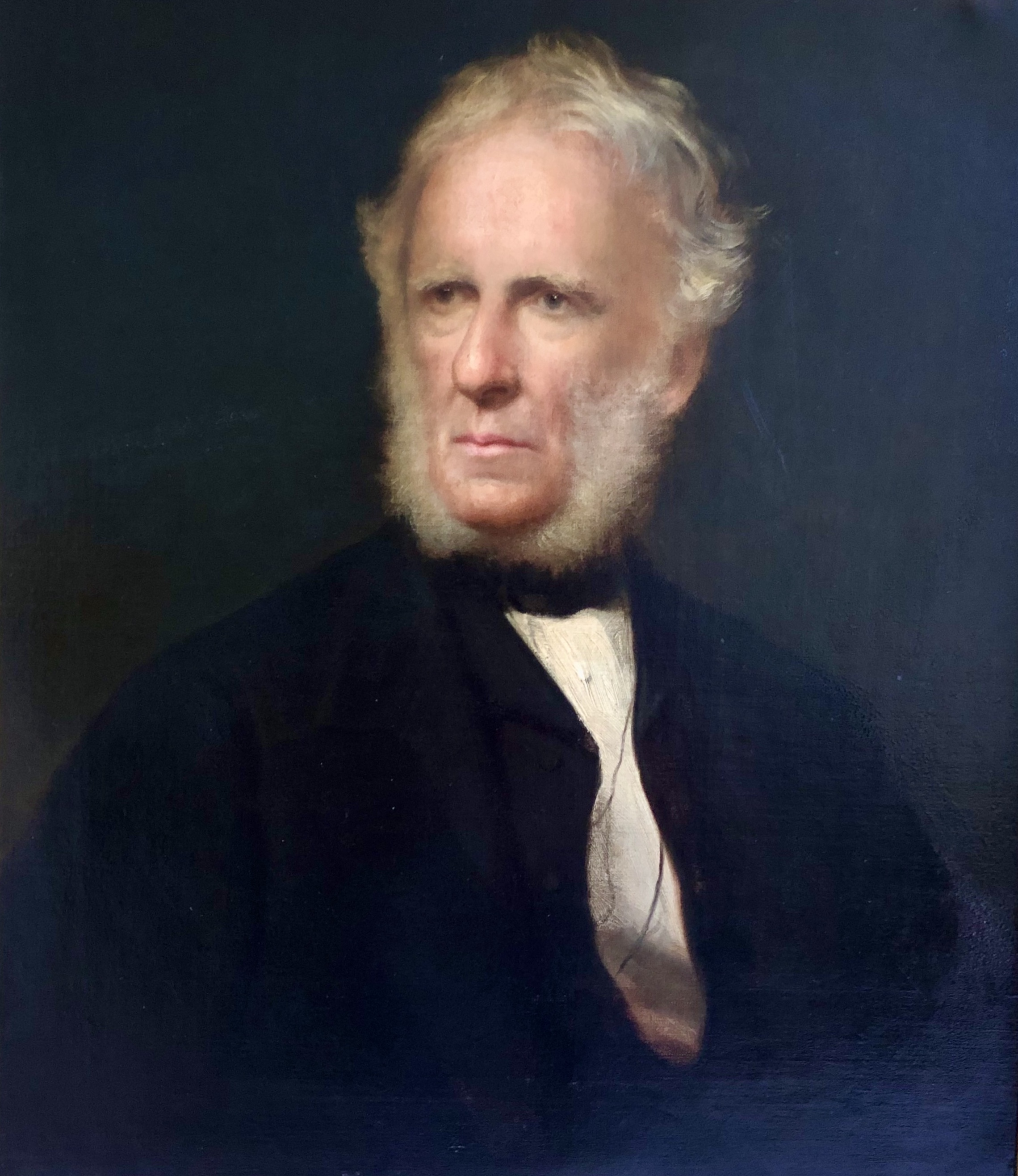
Edmund Potter (before 1883)

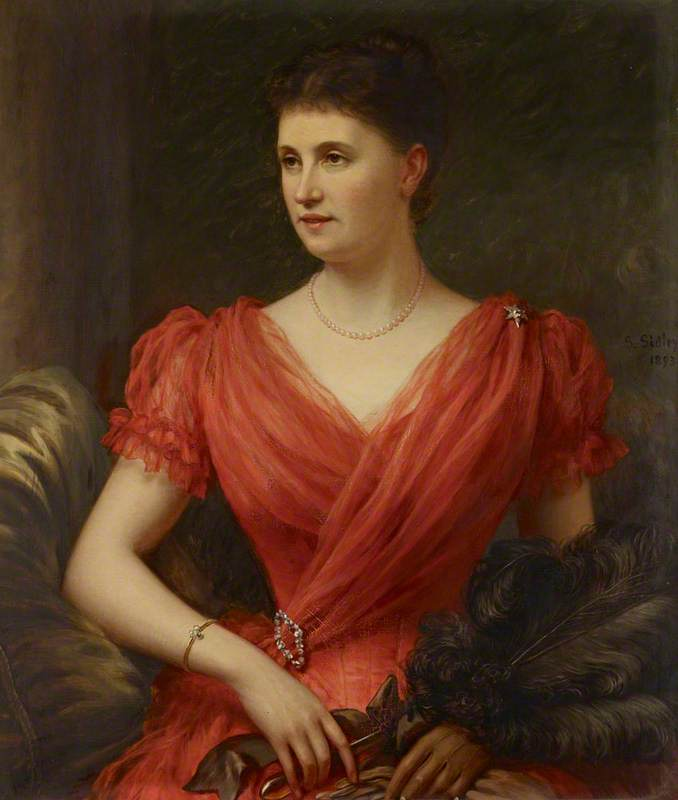
Arabella Bray, Lady Wolfe-Murray (c. 1890)

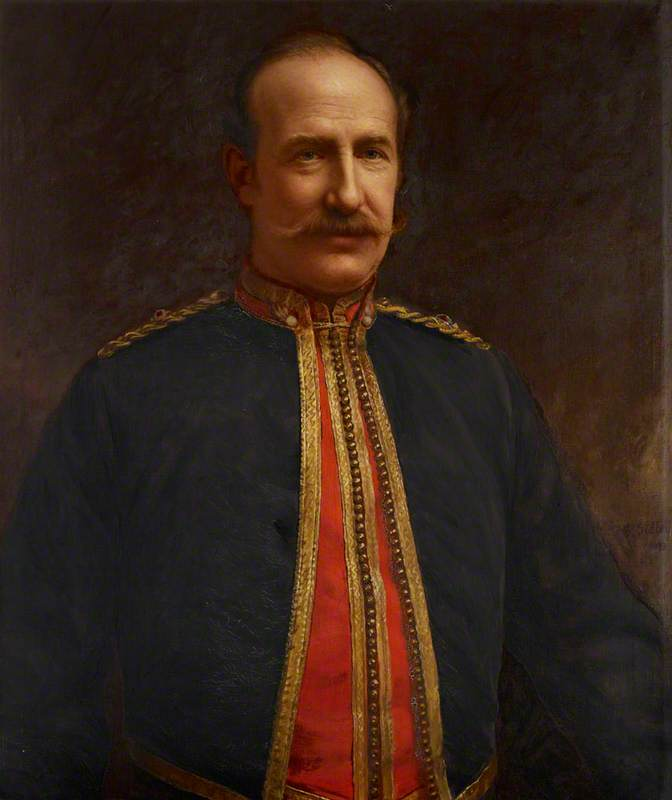
Lt.-Gen. Sir James Wolfe-Murray of Cringletie (1893)

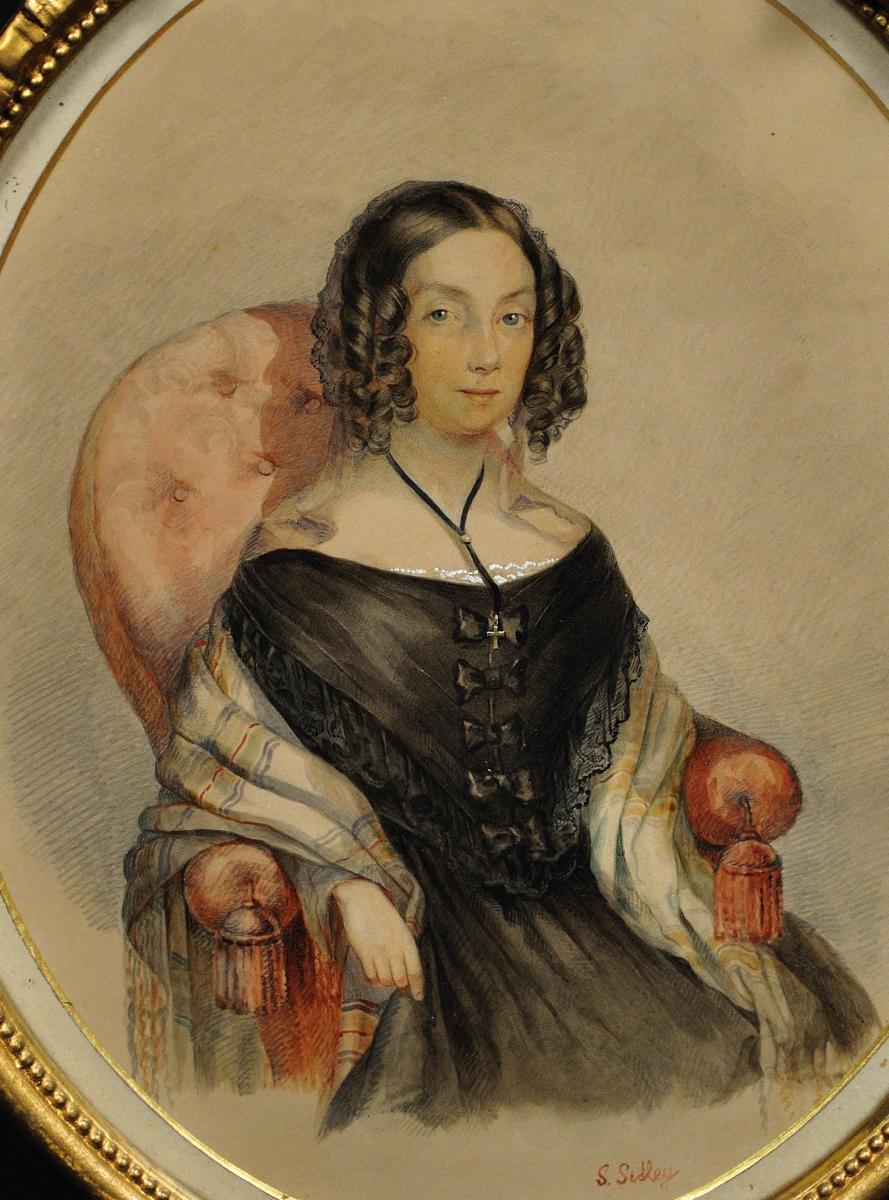
Eliza Letita Cottam née Ironside (before 1896)

== Sources ==
Attribution:

- This article incorporates text from a publication now in the public domain: Cust, Lionel Henry (1897). "Sidley, Samuel". In Lee, Sidney (ed.). Dictionary of National Biography. Vol. 52. London: Smith, Elder & Co. p. 202.
