= William Nicholson Hodgson =

British politician

William Nicholson Hodgson MP

Member of Parliament for East Cumberland
- In office 23 November 1868 – 2 April 1876 Serving with Charles Howard
- Preceded by: Charles Howard; William Marshall
- Succeeded by: Charles Howard; Stafford Howard

Member of Parliament for Carlisle
- In office 12 July 1865 – 18 November 1868 Serving with Edmund Potter
- Preceded by: Wilfrid Lawson; Edmund Potter
- Succeeded by: Edmund Potter; Wilfrid Lawson
- In office 27 March 1857 – 29 April 1859 Serving with James Graham
- Preceded by: James Graham; Joseph Ferguson
- Succeeded by: James Graham; Wilfrid Lawson
- In office 30 July 1847 – 8 July 1852 Serving with Philip Howard (1848–1852); John Dixon (1847–1848)
- Preceded by: William Marshall; Philip Howard
- Succeeded by: Joseph Ferguson; James Graham

Personal details
- Born: 14 August 1801
- Died: 2 April 1876 (aged 74)
- Party: Conservative

William Nicholson Hodgson (14 August 1801 – 2 April 1876) was a British Conservative politician.

== Political career ==
He was first elected MP for Carlisle in 1847 but this result was later declared void. However, he retained the seat in the resulting by-election in 1848. However, he lost the seat in 1852. In 1857, he regained the seat, but at the next election in 1859 was again defeated. Despite contesting the seat at a by-election in 1861, he did not regain the seat until 1865. He was then again defeated in 1868.

However, at the same election, he stood for election in East Cumberland where he was elected and held the seat until his death in 1876.

Parliament of the United Kingdom
Preceded by Charles Howard; William Marshall	Member of Parliament for East Cumberland; 1868 – 1876; With: Charles Howard	Succeeded by Charles Howard; Stafford Howard
Preceded by Wilfrid Lawson; Edmund Potter	Member of Parliament for Carlisle; 1865 – 1868; With: Edmund Potter	Succeeded by Wilfrid Lawson; Edmund Potter
Preceded by James Graham; Joseph Ferguson	Member of Parliament for Carlisle; 1857 – 1859; With: James Graham	Succeeded by James Graham; Wilfrid Lawson
Preceded by William Marshall; Philip Howard	Member of Parliament for Carlisle; 1847 – 1852; With: Philip Howard (1848–1852); John Dixon (1847–1848)	Succeeded by Joseph Ferguson; James Graham
