= Booth Grey (1783-1850) =

English politician

Booth Grey (12 February 1783 – 13 April 1850) was an English politician who served in the House of Commons from 1807 to 1812.

Grey was the son of Booth Grey, of Budworth Magna and his wife Elizabeth Manwaring, daughter of Charles Manwaring of Brombrough, Cheshire. He was educated at Eton College and matriculated at Brasenose College, Oxford in 1800. He was Captain in the Royal Cheshire militia from 1803 to 1805 and Sheriff of Cheshire in 1811–12.

Grey was elected Member of Parliament for Petersfield in 1807. He did not seek re-election in 1812.

Grey married his cousin Lady Sophia Grey, daughter of George Harry Grey, 5th Earl of Stamford on 21 October 1809. He died on 13 April 1850.

| Preceded by Hylton Jolliffe; Hon. John Ward | Member of Parliament for Petersfield; 1807–1812; With: Hylton Jolliffe | Succeeded by Hylton Jolliffe; George Canning |
