= George Howard, 9th Earl of Carlisle =

English painter

The Right Honourable The Earl of Carlisle
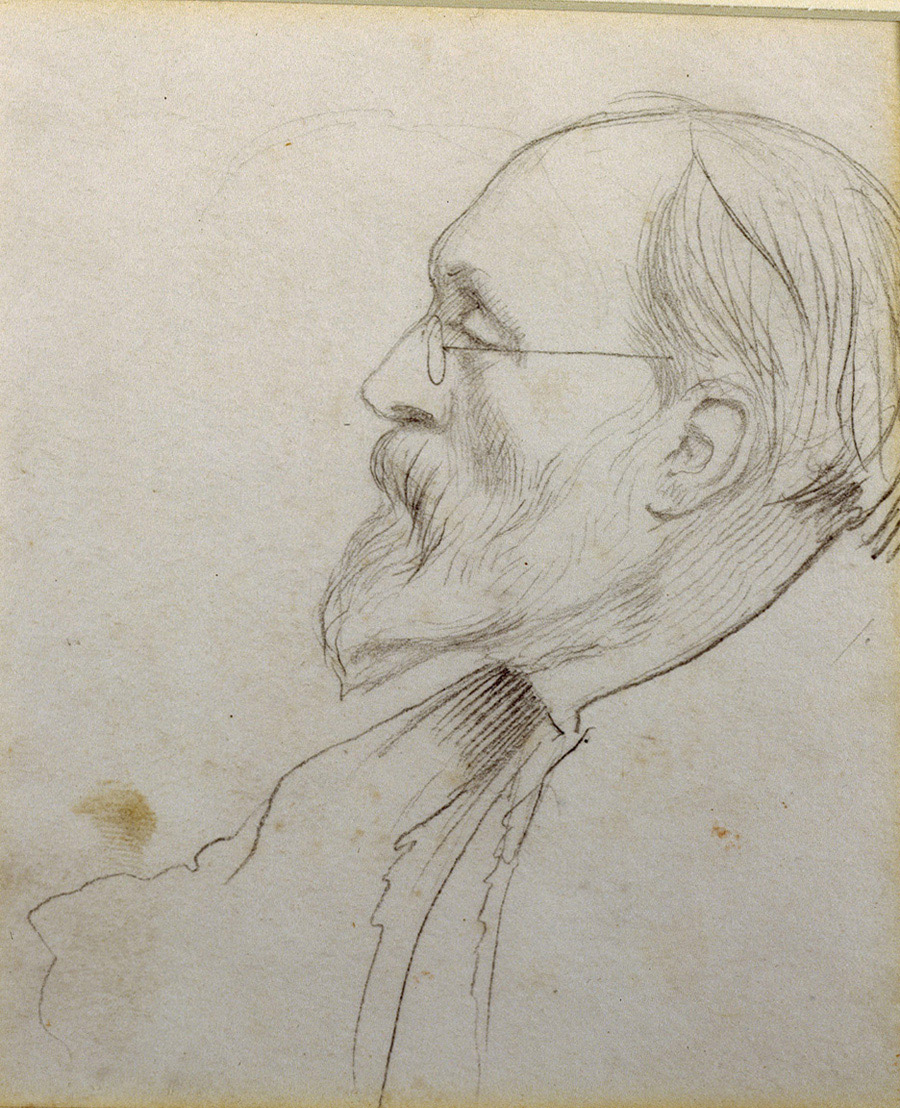
- Howard as sketched by Edward Burne-Jones (drawing in the Delaware Art Museum).

Member of Parliament for Cumberland East
- In office 1881–1885 Serving with Stafford Howard
- Preceded by: Stafford Howard; Sir Richard Musgrave
- Succeeded by: Constituency abolished
- In office 1879–1880 Serving with Stafford Howard
- Preceded by: Charles Howard; Stafford Howard
- Succeeded by: Stafford Howard; Sir Richard Musgrave

Personal details
- Born: 12 August 1843 London, England
- Died: 16 April 1911 (aged 67) Brackland, Hindhead, Surrey
- Spouse: Hon. Rosalind Stanley (m. 1864)
- Children: 11
- Parent(s): Charles Howard; Mary Parke
- Education: Eton College; Trinity College, Cambridge; Heatherley School of Fine Art

George James Howard, 9th Earl of Carlisle (12 August 1843 – 16 April 1911), known as George Howard until 1889, was an English aristocrat, peer, politician, and painter. He was the last Earl of Carlisle to own Castle Howard.

== Early life ==
Howard was born in London, England on 12 August 1843. He was the only son of Hon. Charles Howard and the Hon. Mary Parke, who died fourteen days after his birth.

His father was the fifth son of George Howard, 6th Earl of Carlisle and his maternal grandfather was James Parke, 1st Baron Wensleydale. Among his father's family were uncles George Howard, 7th Earl of Carlisle and William George Howard, 8th Earl of Carlisle, who served as the Rector of Londesborough, both of whom died unmarried and without legitimate issue.

He was educated at Eton and Trinity College, Cambridge, where he joined the Cambridge Apostles in 1864. After graduating from Cambridge he studied at Heatherley School of Fine Art in London.

== Career ==
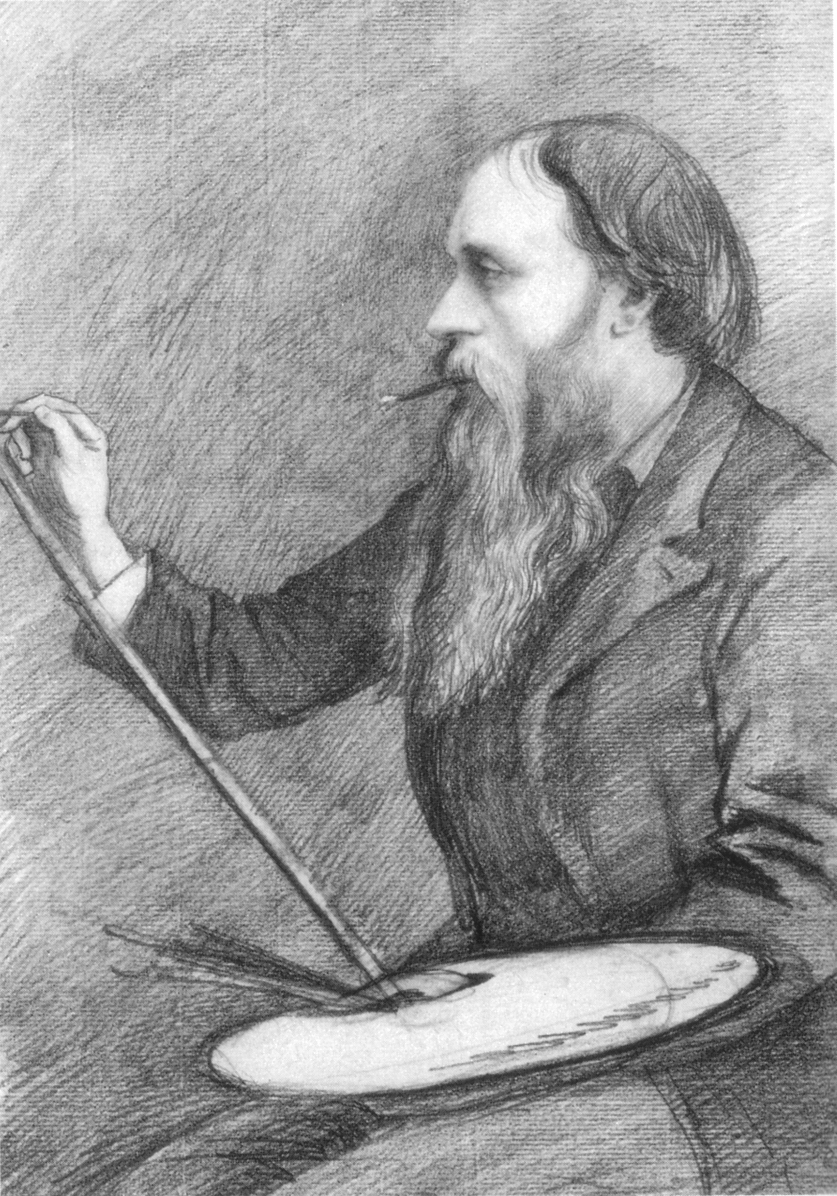
Edward Burne-Jones as drawn by Lord Carlisle

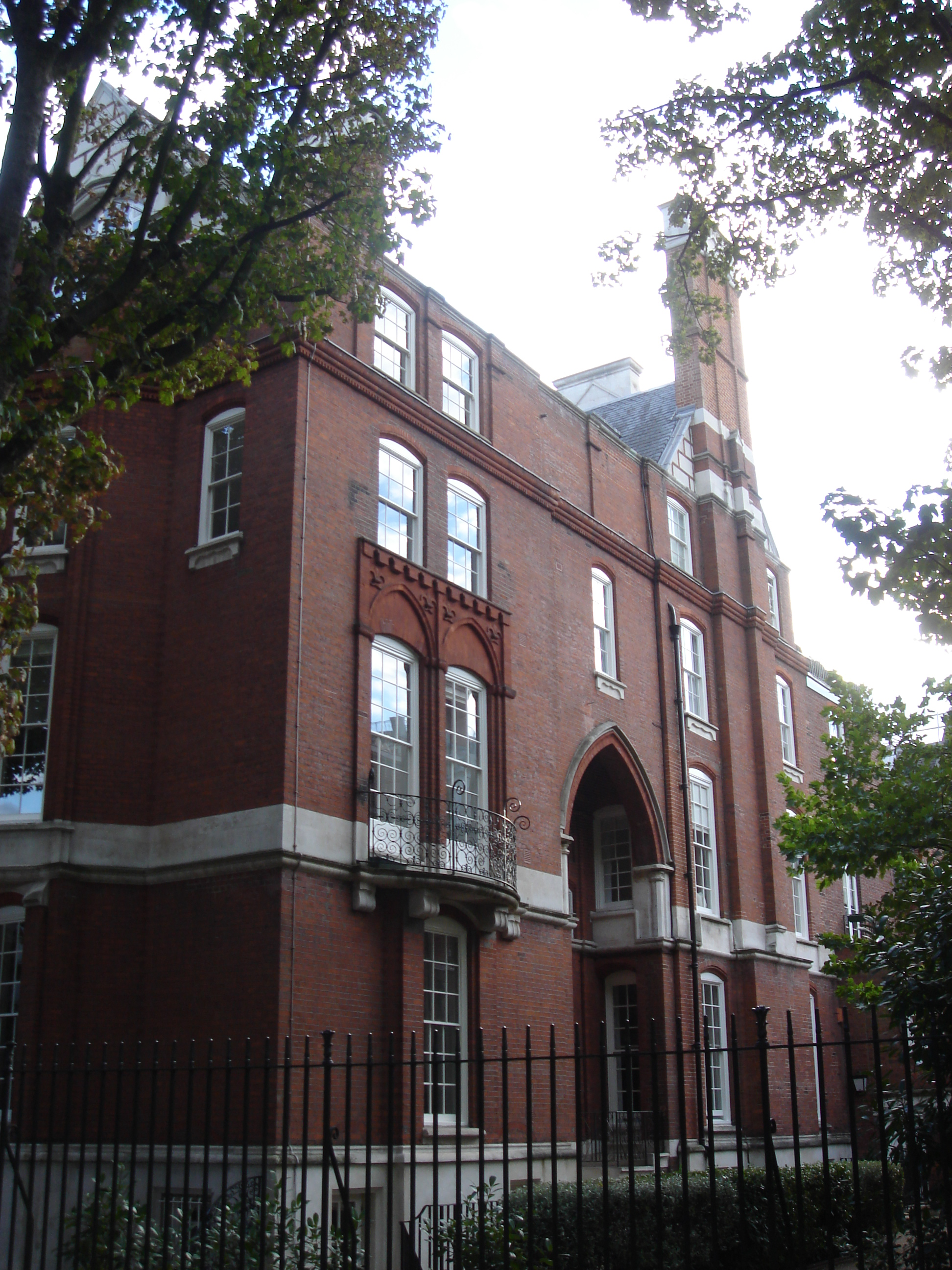
1 Palace Green, London, built for him in 1870

Howard's art teachers were Alphonse Legros and Giovanni Costa, and he belonged to the 'Etruscan School' of painters. He married Rosalind Frances Stanley in 1864, but did not share her campaigning interests, although he supported temperance. He was a friend of, and a patron to, a number of the artists of the Pre-Raphaelite Brotherhood, being particularly close to Edward Burne-Jones.

The Howards lived in London in Kensington, in a house at 1 Palace Green, built for them by Arts and Crafts architect Philip Webb in 1870, and at Naworth Castle. Among their visitors at Naworth were Robert Browning, William Ewart Gladstone, Lewis Carroll, Alfred, Lord Tennyson and many others. William Morris was an intimate friend, and his wallpapers were used in Kensington, at Naworth Castle and at Castle Howard when George inherited it. With Morris and Webb, he was one of the founding members of the Society for the Protection of Ancient Buildings.

=== Collections ===
Lord Carlisle's work can be found in a number of public and private collections, including the Tate, York Art Gallery, the Government Art Collection, the National Portrait Gallery, the Ashmolean Museum, the Delaware Art Museum, the Castle Howard Collection and the British Library. An additional Burne-Jones cartoon is in the private collection of Tomkinsons Stained Glass Ltd.

=== Political career ===
Howard was Liberal Party Member of Parliament for East Cumberland between 1879 and 1880 and again between 1881 and 1885. He succeeded in the earldom in 1889 on the death of his uncle The 8th Earl of Carlisle. He was a trustee of the National Gallery.

== Marriage and issue ==
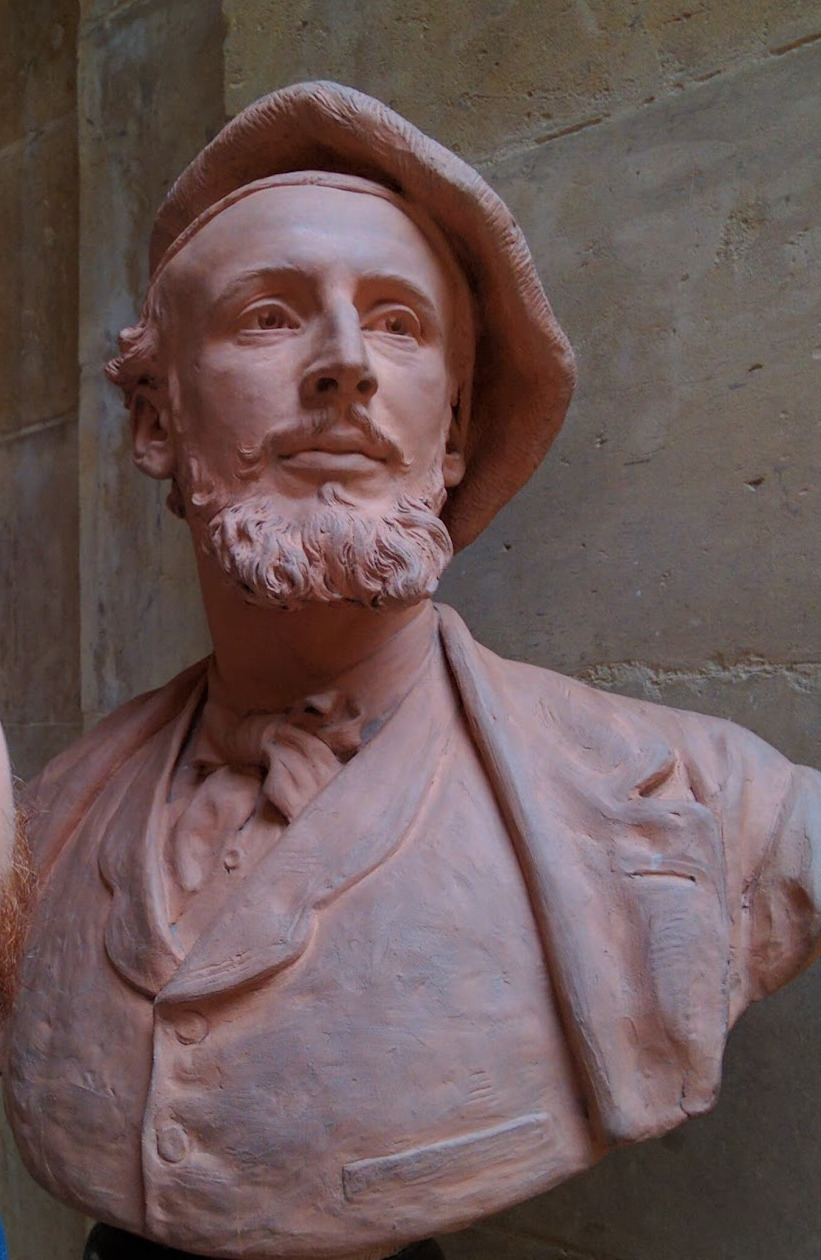
bust produced in 1877 by the sculptor Jules Dalou

On 4 October 1864, Lord Carlisle married The Honourable Rosalind Frances Stanley, daughter of Edward Stanley, 2nd Baron Stanley of Alderley and the Hon. Henrietta Maria Dillon (eldest daughter of Henry Dillon, 13th Viscount Dillon). Together, George and Rosalind were the parents of eleven children:

- Lady Mary Henrietta Howard (20 July 1865 – 2 September 1956), who married George Gilbert Aimé Murray, son of Sir Terence Aubrey Murray, in 1889.
- Charles James Stanley Howard, 10th Earl of Carlisle (1867–1912), who married Rhoda Ankaret L'Estrange, eldest daughter of Col. Paget Walter L'Estrange.
- Lady Cecilia Maude Howard (23 April 1868 - 6 May 1947), who married Charles Henry Roberts, the Under-Secretary of State for India, in 1891.
- Hon. Hubert George Lyulph Howard (3 April 1871 – 2 September 1898), who was killed at the Battle of Omdurman while serving as a correspondent for The Times
- Capt. Hon. Christopher Edward Howard (2 June 1873 – 1 September 1896), 8th King's Royal Irish Hussars, died of pneumonia at Slains Castle after contracting a cold at a shooting party
- Hon. Oliver Howard FSA FRGS (14 March 1875 – 20 September 1908), diplomat, who married Muriel Stephenson (1876–1952) in 1900. After his death of fever in Northern Nigeria, where he was British resident, his widow married Arthur Meade, 5th Earl of Clanwilliam.
- Hon. Geoffrey William Algernon Howard (1877–1935), who married Hon. Ethel Christian Methuen, eldest daughter of Paul Methuen, 3rd Baron Methuen.
- Lt. Hon. Michael Francis Stafford Howard (23 January 1880 – 9 September 1917), who married Nora Hensman in 1911. He was killed in action in the First World War.
- Lady Dorothy Georgiana Howard (6 August 1881 – 14 September 1968), who married Francis Robert Eden, 6th Baron Henley (1877–1962) in 1913.
- Elizabeth Dacre Ethel Howard (12 March 1883 – 17 July 1883), died in infancy. There is a terra cotta effigy by Sir Edgar Boehm on her tomb at Lanercost Priory.
- Lady Aurea Fredeswyde Howard (4 October 1884 – 15 January 1972), who married Denyss Chamberlaine Wace in 1923; he was granted an annulment in 1926 on grounds that the marriage was never consummated. She married Maj. Thomas MacLeod OBE in 1928.

Lord Carlisle died in Brackland, Hindhead, Surrey, in April 1911, aged 67. His eldest son, Charles, succeeded in the earldom. The Countess of Carlisle died on 12 August 1921, aged 76, at her home in Kensington Palace Gardens. Their ashes are interred at Lanercost Priory.

=== Descendants ===
His son Geoffrey was the father of Dame Christian Howard and George Howard, Baron Howard of Henderskelfe.

Through his daughter Lady Dorothy, Carlisle was a grandfather of Michael Francis Eden, 7th Baron Henley (1914–1977).

His daughter Lady Cecilia was the mother of politician Wilfrid Roberts (1900–1991), who had four daughters.

== Ancestry ==
Ancestors of George Howard, 9th Earl of Carlisle

16. Henry Howard, 4th Earl of Carlisle
8. Frederick Howard, 5th Earl of Carlisle (1748–1825)
17. Isabella, daughter of William Byron, 4th Baron Byron
4. George Howard, 6th Earl of Carlisle (1773–1848)
18. Granville Leveson-Gower, 1st Marquess of Stafford
9. Lady Margaret Leveson-Gower
19. Louise, daughter of Scroop Egerton, 1st Duke of Bridgewater
2. Charles Howard (1814–79)
20. William Cavendish, 4th Duke of Devonshire
10. William Cavendish, 5th Duke of Devonshire (1748–1811)
21. Lady Charlotte Boyle, daughter of Richard Boyle, 3rd Earl of Burlington
5. Lady Georgiana Cavendish (1783–1858)
22. John Spencer, 1st Earl Spencer
11. Lady Georgiana Spencer (1757–1806)
23. Margaret Georgiana Poyntz
1. George Howard, 9th Earl of Carlisle (1843–1911)
24. Thomas Parke
12. Thomas Parke (1731–1819)
25. Hannah Fryer
6. James Parke, 1st Baron Wensleydale (1782–1868)
26. William Preston
13. Ann Preston
27.
3. Hon Mary Parke (-1843)
28. Francis Barlow (1691-c1770)
14. Samuel Barlow (1747–1800)
29. Elizabeth Carter (1724–?)
7. Cecilia Barlow (1793–1879)
30. William Thornton (-1769)
15. Mary Thornton
31. Mary Mister (-1800)

Parliament of the United Kingdom
Preceded by Charles Howard; Stafford Howard	Member of Parliament for Cumberland East; 1879–1880; With: Stafford Howard	Succeeded by Stafford Howard; Sir Richard Musgrave
Preceded by Stafford Howard; Sir Richard Musgrave	Member of Parliament for Cumberland East; 1881–1885; With: Stafford Howard	Constituency abolished
Peerage of England
Preceded by William Howard	Earl of Carlisle; 1889–1911	Succeeded by Charles Howard
