= Stafford Howard =

British politician and magistrate

Sir Edward Stafford Howard KCB DL JP (28 November 1851 – 8 April 1916) was a British Liberal politician and magistrate.

== Background and education ==
A member of the influential Howard family headed by the Duke of Norfolk, Howard was the second son of Henry Howard, son of Lord Henry Howard-Molyneux-Howard and nephew of Bernard Howard, 12th Duke of Norfolk. His mother was Charlotte Caroline Georgina Long, daughter of Henry Lawes Long and Catharine Long of Hampton Lodge, Surrey. He was the younger brother of Penrith MP Henry Howard and the elder brother of Lord Howard of Penrith. He was educated at Harrow School and Trinity College, Cambridge. He was called to the bar at Inner Temple.

== Political career ==
Howard entered Parliament as one of two representatives for Cumberland East at a by-election in 1876, a seat he held until 1885 when the constituency was abolished under the Redistribution of Seats Act 1885. At the 1885 general election, he was elected as MP for Thornbury until he was defeated at the 1886 election. He served briefly as Under-Secretary of State for India from April to July 1886 in William Ewart Gladstone's short-lived third administration. Howard was later Senior Commissioner of HM's Woods and Forests. He was appointed a Companion of the Order of the Bath (CB) in the 1900 Birthday Honours, and a Knight Commander (KCB) of the same order in the 1909 Birthday Honours. He served as Mayor of the town of Llanelli from 1913 to 1916. He was an Ecclesiastical Commissioner from 1914 to his death. He was also a Justice of the Peace and a Deputy Lieutenant of Gloucestershire.

== Family ==
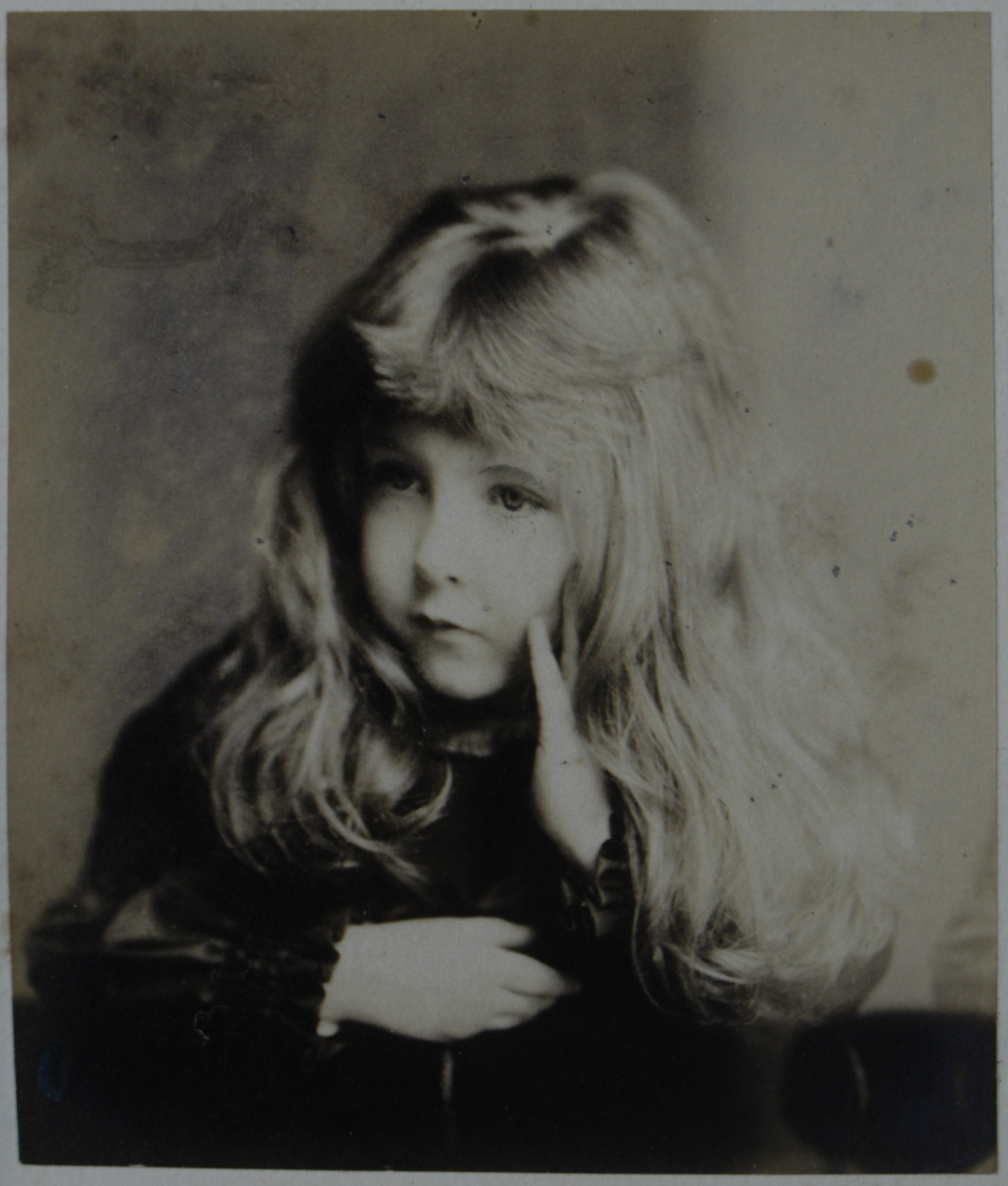
Catherine Meriel (Alcyone), Lady Stepney-Howard (1876–1952), as a child.

Howard married firstly Lady Rachel Anne Georgina, daughter of John Campbell, 2nd Earl Cawdor, in 1876. She died in 1906, leaving one son and two daughters:

- Ruth Evelyn Howard (1877–1962); who married first at Brompton Oratory on 5 February 1903 Gardner Sebastian Bazley (1863–1911), son of Sir Thomas Bazley, Baronet, of Hatherop Castle, and had five children including Sir Thomas Bazley, 3rd Baronet and future baronets; and secondly in 1913 Commander Francis Charles Cadogan (1885–1970), of the Cadogan family, and had another two children, including Henriette, Lady Abel Smith.
- Sir Algar Howard (1880–1970), an officer at arms at the College of Arms in London.
- Alianore Rachel Howard (1886–1974); who married, in 1913, Major Arthur Hugh Brabazon Talbot-Ponsonby (1885–1952), and left a daughter.

=== Lady Howard Stepney ===
He married secondly, in 1911, Catharine Meriel, MBE, only child of Sir Arthur Cowell-Stepney, 11th/2nd and last Baronet, by hon. Margaret Warren, fourth daughter of the second baron de Tabley. After Howard's death, at the age of 64 in 1916,

Lady Howard served the remainder of his term as Mayor of Llanelly. She was a JP from 1920; a Carmarthenshire County Councillor; and a Dame of the Order of St. John. She lived at Cilymaenllwyd, Llanelly, and at Woodend, South Ascot. Her telephone numbers were Llanelly 2 and Ascot 37. She was a member of the Ladies' Hyde Park and Bath clubs. She was granted authority, by royal licence, to take additional surname of Stepney in 1922, and died on 8 June 1952.

She was a member of the Ladies' Hyde Park and Bath clubs. She was granted authority, by royal licence, to take additional surname of Stepney in 1922, and died on 8 June 1952.

==== Youngest daughter ====
Margaret Catherine Stepney Howard Stepney (London, 20 January 1913 – London, 22 January 1953), of Cilymaenllwyd, Llanelly, and Chase End, Compton Avenue, Hampstead Lane, London, was the daughter of Sir Stafford by his second wife, Alcyone Cowell-Stepney. She married, in 1933, to Patrick Wyndham Murray-Threipland (1904–1957), only son of Colonel William Murray Threipland, had one son and divorced in 1938. In later life she was a friend and patron of Dylan Thomas.

==== Younger son ====
Captain Stafford Vaughan Stepney Howard (3 September 1915 – 1991) changed his surname from Howard-Stepney to Howard by deed poll in August 1950 (Note: Signed by his half-brother, Algar Howard, Garter, College of Arms, London.) on inheriting the family estates in Cumbria, which included Greystoke Castle.

He stood, unsuccessfully, twice for Parliament in the Liberal interest, in south Gloucestershire in 1950 and in 1951 the Penrith and the Border constituency. He was a parish and county councillor, chairman of Penrith and Border Liberal Party, chairman of the Ullswater Outward Bound Trust, served on the Lake District Planning Board and the Ullswater Preservation Society, and was High Sheriff of Cumbria in 1979.

He married, firstly, Ursula Priscilla Marie Gabrielle, daughter of Colonel Sir James Horlick, 4th Baronet, on 15 July 1936 (they divorced in 1940), and secondly, Mary Gracia (1913–2004), daughter of George Wilder Neville, of Portsmouth, Virginia, and New York City, on 24 October 1940. Gracia became a trustee of the Shrewsbury Hospital in Sheffield in 1965.

By his first wife, he had the GCHQ operative and mathematician Nicholas Stafford Howard (20 July 1937 – 17 February 2008), of Johnby Hall, Penrith, and, by his second wife, he had two daughters and a further son, Lt.-Col. Murray Bernard Neville Cyprian Howard, OBE (born 1942), who inherited Greystoke Castle.

== Notes ==
Parliament of the United Kingdom
Preceded by Charles Howard; William Nicholson Hodgson	Member of Parliament for Cumberland East; 1876–1885; With: Charles Howard 1876–1879; George Howard 1879–1880, 1881–1885; Sir Richard Musgrave, Bt 1880–1881	Constituency abolished
New constituency	Member of Parliament for Thornbury; 1885–1886	Succeeded by John Plunkett
Political offices
Preceded by Sir Ughtred Kay-Shuttleworth, Bt	Under-Secretary of State for India; 1886	Succeeded by Sir John Eldon Gorst
