= Charles Howard (British politician) =

British politician (1814–1879)

The Honourable Charles Howard

Member of Parliament for Cumberland East
- In office 1840–1879 Serving with William James, William Marshall, William Nicholson Hodgson, Stafford Howard
- Preceded by: William James; Francis Aglionby
- Succeeded by: Stafford Howard; George Howard

Personal details
- Born: The Hon. Charles Wentworth George Howard; 27 March 1814; Chiswick, London
- Died: 11 April 1879 (aged 65); Holker Hall, Cumbria
- Spouse: Mary Priscilla Harriet Parke (m. 1842; died 1843)
- Children: George Howard, 9th Earl of Carlisle
- Parent(s): George Howard, 6th Earl of Carlisle; Lady Georgiana Dorothy

The Hon. Charles Wentworth George Howard (27 March 1814 – 11 April 1879) was an English politician from the Howard family who was a long-standing Whig (and then Liberal) British Member of Parliament.

== Early life ==
Howard was born at his father's house in Chiswick, London, the fifth son of George Howard, 6th Earl of Carlisle, and his wife Lady Georgiana Dorothy, daughter of William Cavendish, 5th Duke of Devonshire and Lady Georgiana Spencer. Among his siblings were older brothers, George Howard, 7th Earl of Carlisle, and the Rev. William George Howard, 8th Earl of Carlisle, both of whom died unmarried and without legitimate issue.

== Career ==
Howard was elected to the House of Commons as one of two representatives for Cumberland East at a by-election in 1840, a seat he held until his death in 1879. During his lengthy tenure, he served alongside William James from 1840 to 1847, William Marshall from 1847 to 1868, William Nicholson Hodgson from 1868 to 1876, and Stafford Howard from 1876 to 1879.

== Personal life ==
On 8 August 1842, Howard was married to Mary Priscilla Harriet Parke (1822–1843), daughter of James Parke, 1st Baron Wensleydale, in 1842. She died on 26 August 1843, only two weeks after the birth of their son and only child:

- George James Howard (1843–1911), who succeeded him as Member of Parliament for Cumberland East and in 1889 also succeeded his uncle as ninth Earl of Carlisle. In 1864, he married Hon. Rosalind Frances Stanley, fifth daughter of Edward Stanley, 2nd Baron Stanley of Alderley, with whom he had eleven children.

Howard survived her by 36 years and died in April 1879, aged 65 at Holker House, the Lancashire seat of the Duke of Devonshire, Howard's brother-in-law through his late sister Lady Blanche Georgiana Howard.

=== Memorial ===
The East Window of the famous Pre-Raphaelite church, St Martin's Church, Brampton, Cumbria was installed as the County Memorial to Howard. Designed by Edward Burne-Jones, it depicts Christ the Good Shepherd and four saints: Martin, the patron of the church; Mary, the Virgin; Dorothy, and George.

Parliament of the United Kingdom
Preceded by William James; Francis Aglionby	Member of Parliament for Cumberland East; 1840–1879; With: William James 1840–1847; William Marshall 1847–1868; William Nicholson Hodgson 1868–1876; Stafford Howard 1876–1879	Succeeded by Stafford Howard; George Howard
