= Skirwith Abbey =

Coordinates: 54.6821°N 2.5988°W

Skirwith Abbey is a country house in Skirwith, Cumbria, England. The House is a two-storey house of five by three bays, built by Thomas Addison, mason, in 1768-74 for John Orfeur Yates, who spent many years in India. The main front has more closely spaced windows in the centre, and differences in the ashlar stonework also define the centre and angles. The front door is approached by a splayed, balustraded staircase carried on a bridge over the wide area that encircles the house. The rear of the house is similar, and both sides have a canted full-height bay window in the centre. Except for the entrance front, the area is surrounded by cast iron railings with obelisk standards.
