= Aglionby =

Aglionby may be the surname of:

- Edward Aglionby (died c. 1591) (1520–c. 1591), MP for Carlisle, and for Warwick, and poet
- Edward Aglionby (died 1553), MP for Carlisle
- Edward Aglionby (died 1599), MP for Carlisle
- Hugh Aglionby, MP
- John Aglionby (divine), died ca. 1610
- John Aglionby (bishop), Bishop of Accra from 1924 to 1951
- John Aglionby (MP), MP from 1553 to 1559
- Julia Aglionby (born 1969), British surveyor

As a placename it may refer to:

- Aglionby, Cumbria, England
