= Edward Aglionby =

Edward Aglionby may refer to:

- Edward Aglionby (died c. 1591) (1520–c. 1591), MP for Carlisle, and for Warwick, and poet
- Edward Aglionby (died 1553), MP for Carlisle
- Edward Aglionby (died 1599), MP for Carlisle
- Edward Aglionby (1587–1648), MP for Carlisle (UK Parliament constituency)
