= Thomas Blennerhassett =

Thomas Blennerhassett (fl. 1584–1611) was an English politician who sat in the House of Commons at various times between 1584 and 1611.

Blennerhassett may have been the son of Richard Blennerhassett, a member of the Carlisle Council in 1569. In 1584, Blennerhassett was elected Member of Parliament for Carlisle. He was re-elected MP for Carlisle in 1586. In 1597 he was Mayor of Carlisle. He was elected MP for Carlisle again in 1604.

Parliament of England
Preceded by Thomas Pattenson; Thomas Barne	Member of Parliament for Carlisle; 1584–1587; With: Edward Aglionby 1584; Henry Macwilliam 1586; William Bowyer	Succeeded by Henry Scrope; John Dalston
Preceded by Henry Scrope; John Dudley	Member of Parliament for Carlisle; 1604–1611; With: William Barwick	Succeeded by George Butler; Nathaniel Tomkins
