= John Dudley (disambiguation) =

John Dudley, 1st Duke of Northumberland (1504–1553) was Lord President of the Council 1549–1553, during the minority of Edward VI.

John Dudley may also refer to:

- John Dudley, 2nd Earl of Warwick (c. 1530–1554), son of the above
- John Dudley (died 1580), MP for Helston and Carlisle
- John Dudley (1569–1645), MP for Staffordshire and brother of Edward Sutton, 5th Baron Dudley
- John Dudley (c. 1573 – c. 1622), MP for Carlisle
- John Dudley (writer) (1762–1856), English writer
- John Dudley (physicist), New Zealand physicist
- John H. Dudley (1907–1994), American military officer
- John Dudley (judge) (1725–1805), Justice of the New Hampshire Supreme Court
