= Dalston (disambiguation) =

Dalston is a district of London, England.

Dalston may also refer to:

- Dalston, Cumbria, a village in North West England
- Dalston (Hackney ward), an electoral ward in London, England
- Dalston, Ontario, Canada
- Dalston baronets

== People with the surname ==
- George Dalston (1581–1657), English politician
- William Dalston (died 1683), English politician

== See also ==
- Dalston railway station (disambiguation)
