= Robert Carlisle =

Robert Carlisle may refer to:

- Robert Carlisle (died c. 1425), MP for Carlisle
- Robert Carlisle (died 1433), MP for Carlisle
- Robert Carlisle, editor of Punch Drunks, a 1934 short film
- Robert Carlisle, ranchero of Rancho Santa Ana del Chino who died in a shoot out
- Bob Carlisle (born 1956), American singer

== See also ==
- Robert Carlyle (born 1961), Scottish actor
- Robert Warrand Carlyle (1859–1934), Indian civil servant
