= John Aglionby =

John Aglionby may refer to:

- John Aglionby (divine) (1567–c. 1610), Anglican divine
- John Aglionby (bishop) (1884–1963), Anglican bishop in Africa
- John Aglionby (MP) (died 1575 or later), English politician
