= General Dudley =

General Dudley may refer to:

- Ambrose Dudley, 3rd Earl of Warwick (c. 1530–1590), English Army general
- John H. Dudley (1907–1994), U.S. Army brigadier general
- John Dudley, 1st Duke of Northumberland (1504–1553), English Army general
- Robert Dudley, 1st Earl of Leicester (1532–1588), English Army captain general
