= Eric Martlew =

British politician

Member of Parliament for Carlisle
- In office 11 June 1987 – 12 April 2010
- Preceded by: Ronald Lewis
- Succeeded by: John Stevenson

Personal details
- Born: Eric Anthony Martlew; 3 January 1949 (age 77) Ince-in-Makerfield, Lancashire, England
- Party: Labour
- Spouse: Elsie Duggan (m. 1970)
- Website: ericmartlew.org.uk

Eric Anthony Martlew (born 3 January 1949) is a British Labour Party politician who served as Member of Parliament (MP) for Carlisle from 1987 to 2010.

== Early life and career ==
Eric Anthony Martlew was born on 3 January 1949 in Ince-in-Makerfield, Lancashire. He grew-up in Carlisle, Cumbria, where he studied at Harraby Secondary Modern School and Carlisle College. Martlew worked as a technician and personnel manager at the Nestlé factory in Dalston from 1966 to 1987.

He served as a member of Carlisle Borough Council from 1972 to 1974 and Cumbria County Council from 1973 to 1988. Martlew chaired the County Council from 1983 to 1985 and the East Cumbria Health Authority from 1977 to 1979.

== Parliamentary career ==
Martlew was elected as Member of Parliament for Carlisle at the 1987 general election, narrowly increasing Ronald Lewis' majority from 71 votes to 916. He served as a Shadow Minister for Defence from 1992 to 1997 and an Opposition Whip from 1996 to 1997.

After the 1997 general election, he became Parliamentary Private Secretary (PPS) to the Chancellor of the Duchy of Lancaster, David Clark. He changed roles in 1998, becoming PPS to the Lords Leader and Minister for Women, Baroness Jay of Paddington, until her Cabinet retirement in 2001.

Martlew announced on 1 May 2009 that he would stand down from Parliament, and retired at the 2010 general election. He was made a Freeman of the City of Carlisle in 2016, and was later chair of the Association of Former Members of Parliament.

== Personal life ==
Martlew married Elsie Duggan in 1970 in Carlisle. His German Shepherd, Tag, was voted Westminster Dog of the Year in 2006.

Parliament of the United Kingdom
Preceded by Ronald Lewis	Member of Parliament for Carlisle; 1987–2010	Succeeded by John Stevenson
