= Robert Dalton =

Robert, Rob, or Bob Dalton may refer to:

- Robert Dalton (MP), English politician, Member of Parliament for Carlisle in 1558
- Robert Dalton, actor in Secret Agent X-9 (1937 serial)
- Bobby Dalton (born 1998), English boxer
- Bob Dalton (1868–1892), leader of the Dalton Gang in the American Old West
- Bob Dalton, player on the national champion 1958–59 California Golden Bears men's basketball team
- Robert Dalton, a character in UNIT: Snake Head

== See also ==
- Rob D'Alton (born 1923), Irish sailor
