= Margery Jackson =

English miser and litigator (1722–1812)

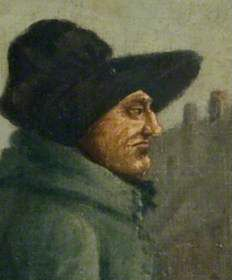
- Jackson in old age, c. 1811
- Born: January 1722; Carlisle, Cumberland, England
- Died: 10 February 1812 (aged 90); Botcherby, Cumberland, England
- Occupations: Landlady, litigant and miser
- Known for: Local character; subject of books, paintings and a musical

Margery Jackson (January 1722 – 10 February 1812) was a British landlady in Carlisle, Cumberland. She was the daughter of a wealthy cloth merchant who was the mayor of Carlisle. In her latter years, following a fifteen-year legal dispute in the Court of Chancery over the execution of her father's and brother's wills, she returned from London to Carlisle in possession of the family fortune. She was then 69 years old and a spinster.

Thereafter, while living like a pauper in the family townhouse on Carlisle's market square, Jackson accrued a box of gold in rent from her properties. She became a local character, well-known for her miserly behaviour, her drinking, swearing and forthright speech, and her hidden riches, leading her to be nicknamed the Carlisle Miser. She was kind to her horses and dogs. In spite of her reclusive lifestyle, she had a friend in her financial advisor, Joseph Bowman of Botcherby, who took her into his home during her last illness.

Since her death in 1812, Jackson has been remembered in books, verse, a musical, and Tullie House Museum displays, for her eccentric behaviour, and for the size of her fortune, most of which she left to Bowman. Jackson was caricatured as a miser in the traditional manner until the publication in 1991 of a book by Helen R. Hallaway, which reassesses her position as an independent woman in the society of her era.

== Life before Jackson's court cases ==
=== Financial and family background ===
In Jackson's time, family background mattered, and she had a background of social distinction. Her maternal grandfather was alderman William Nicholson JP, mayor of Carlisle and relative of William Nicolson, bishop of Carlisle. Her maternal great grandmother, after whom she was named, was Margery Aglionby, wife of John Aglionby, a hero of the siege of Carlisle. Her maternal grandmother was an Aglionby of Anglo-Norman descent, with aristocratic relatives and family arms displayed in St Cuthbert's Church, Carlisle. Her Aglionby ancestors included members of Parliament, mayors of Carlisle and a chaplain to Queen Elizabeth I, John Aglionby. In Jackson's lifetime, the Aglionbys' seat was the Nunnery of Ainstable.

Jackson's paternal grandfather was Carlisle landowner Thomas "Trooper Tom" Jackson (died 1700), a freeman of the city of Carlisle, who was recruited as a Cromwellian soldier of the English Civil War in 1648. Her father, a rich draper and cloth merchant, was Joseph Jackson (c. 1695–1732), mayor of Carlisle. As a moneylender and landlord, Jackson owned "considerable estates and personal property", and "kept himself well informed on the law" for fear of untrustworthy lawyers.

In 1710 Jackson's father Joseph married Isabella Nicolson (1683–1733). Isabella was a cousin of Bishop Nicolson, and a relative by marriage of Barry Yelverton who became Viscount Avonmore. Joseph and Isabella Jackson had four children: clergyman and mayor of Carlisle William Nicolson Jackson (1720–1776), Captain Joseph Jackson (1721 – 11 June 1746), student Jerome or Jerom Jackson (1728–1751) and Margery Jackson.

=== Jackson's early life, 1722–1776 ===
Margery Jackson, who was born in Carlisle in January 1722 and baptised in the same town on 22 February 1722, grew up in the care of her cousin Thomas James (1706–1739) and his sister Elizabeth James (born 1708). She was educated on their instructions in the manner of the moneyed merchant class of that era, being taught to read and write, but not expected to assist in the drapery business. In the interests of catching a husband, she had a dancing master, and personal luxuries such as, "powder and pins", "hoop pettycoate", "dormees and double ruffles", "a pair of scarlet stockings", "a fan and ribbin", etc. According to Hallaway (1991), Elizabeth James' strictness "evoked in Margery only vehement hostility and ascerbity of temper", which denied her the chance of a husband, and affected her later character.

Some time after the death of Thomas James in 1739, Jackson was returned to her brother William, who by then had married, so that Jackson, now a difficult character, was not welcome. During this period of Jackson's early life, William became "a very rich man" and in 1743 paid Jackson her father's legacy of £1,250 (equivalent to £259,900 in 2025). During the Jacobite rising of 1745, William and his wife left the town, so Jackson made a profit from the soldiers as lodgers in the family house. It has been suggested that Jackson worked for a while as a servant or maid in London until her brother William died in 1776, and that she then lodged at Stanwix for a while before returning to London to file her suit.

== Court cases ==
=== Life in London and Stafford, 1776–1791 ===
This was the period of legal dispute, when Jackson reportedly travelled to London "on foot" to open her Chancery case. At some period, possibly during her years of legal dispute, Jackson boarded at Stafford with Se Bright, a milliner from Windsor, Berkshire, and remembered Bright's kindness in her will of 1783. Jackson is recorded as having funded the rebuilding of Botcherby Mill in 1790, although she did not acquire the money to do so until 1791. (Note: Botcherby Mill burned down in 1995.)

=== Legacies and disputes ===
Joseph Jackson left his estates to his eldest son William, £1,000 (equivalent to £213,700 in 2025) each to his remaining three children, and his personal property to his wife Isabella. Subsequently, Isabella left £550 (equivalent to £113,200 in 2025) each to her sons William, then aged 21, Joseph aged 12 and Jerome aged 5, £200 (equivalent to £41,200 in 2025) to Margery aged 11, and the estates and remaining property to William, who was made executor of the will. William did not initially pay out the legacies to his siblings. William and Margery exchanged letters in June 1773, in which Margery showed affection, calling him "a brother I hold near to me as even that of a parent", while William referred to her "pride" and "barbarous treatment". William was sued in Chancery by Margery for the moneys. Hallaway (1991) paraphrases the Jackson versus Jackson (1774) bill of complaint thus:

Under her father's will, [Jackson] and her two brothers Joseph and Jerom were to receive one thousand pounds each on reaching their majority. Margery was paid her legacy but Joseph and Jerom, at twenty-one, got nothing at all. According to her mother's will, Margery was left two hundred pounds, and her brothers, William included, inherited five hundred and fifty pounds each. This legacy was never paid. As both brothers died intestate ... Margery and William were entitled to divide these estates equally among themselves. She was claiming from William half of these unpaid legacies – in fact the principal and interest on one thousand, five hundred and fifty pounds. (Note: equivalent to £202,100 in 2025)

The case was still not resolved when, in 1776, William died. Blair (1848) says that William left a small annuity to his sister Margery, but Hallaway (1991) says that William's will, written in 1768, left her "nothing at all". Margery's brothers Joseph and Jerome having died, William left the bulk of his property to their third cousin Thomas Hodgson (died 1788), and so began Margery's 1776 Chancery case of Jackson versus Hodgson in dispute of William's will. "Nursing her grievance, [Jackson] walked all the way back [to London]".

To forward the Chancery case, Jackson versus Richardson and Hodgson (1776), against her brother's executor Richardson and the legatee Hodgson, Jackson retained attorney Robert Mounsey of Holborn, London (to be paid only if the case was won), and enlisted the support of Quaker Joseph Bowman of Botcherby, (Note: (died 1831)) who became her investigator and friend. Thereafter, she stayed in London for fifteen years, watching over her case and over the efforts of her attorney. Jackson was claiming her legacies from both parents, plus interest, on the grounds that they remained unpaid. She also claimed half of the yet-unpaid legacies of her deceased brothers. "Throughout the case [Jackson] took a position of immovable righteousness while her opponents concocted devious schemes". Hodgson died, leaving the property to fifteen other Hodgsons, and Jackson came to an agreement with them. The fifteen Hodgsons accepted £100 (equivalent to £13,036 in 2025) each plus costs, and in 1791 Jackson received all of the remainder of her family's legacy. "It was manly due to [Bowman's] diligence [as an investigator] that this case came to an end".

== Life in Carlisle, 1791–1809 ==
=== Appearance ===
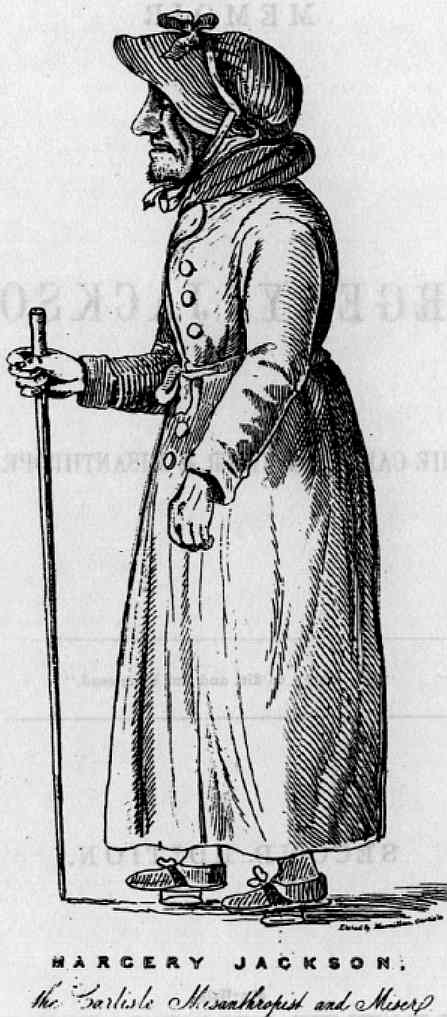
Jackson in duffel coat and pattens

Jackson was of medium height, but as observed in old age she was "thin, sallow, and shrivelled, with a most forbidding aspect", and she would pay no dressmaker:

In the very heat of summer [Miss Jackson] was sometimes seen dressed in an old washed-out yellow gown, which she always held up so as to exhibit a yellow white petticoat; she would then also wear a blackish silk cloak, something of the scarf shape, which might have been Margery's finest adornings for thirty or forty years, but her favourite and general dress was an old gray duffle coat, – none of your mandarins, full and short, with hanging sleeves, – but tight every way, and only so short as to save the bottom from wearing away against the stones, and expose to view her gold buckles, the same, we may suppose, as graced the under-members of her great-grandmother centuries ago! This said grey doublet was confined at the old maiden's waist with a hemp-cord, and had a hood, which was drawn up under a brownish-black bonnet of indescribable shape; she generally used pattens, and carried in her hand a gold-headed cane.

=== Character ===
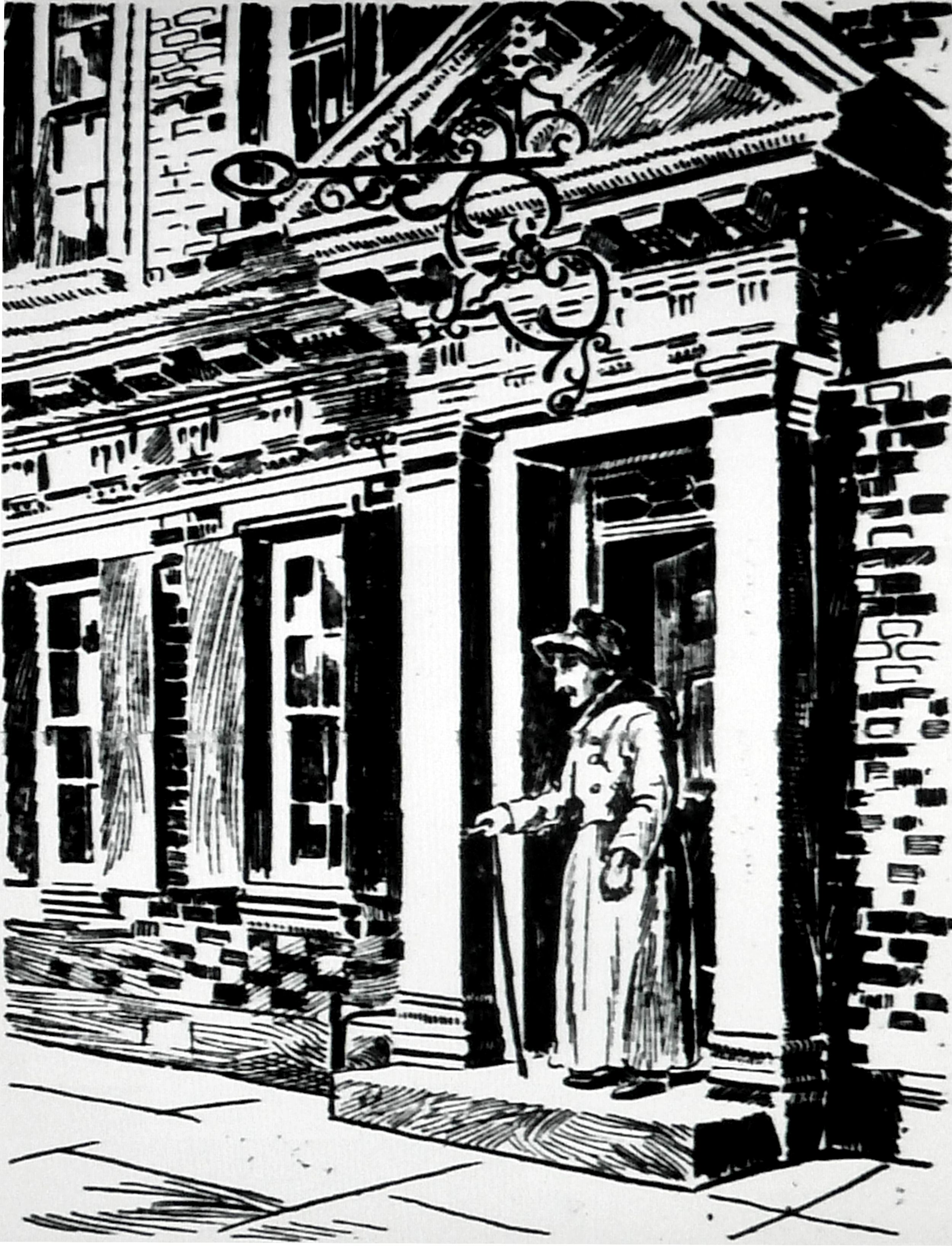
Jackson at her front door, after M. E. Nutter

Much of what is known about Jackson's character refers to her miserliness and misanthropy during her Carlisle years, and is taken from her newspaper obituaries of 1812, and repeated in Blair (1848) and in "The life of Margery Jackson" in the Carlisle Journal (1896). Following the successful conclusion of her Chancery case, Jackson returned to Carlisle in 1791, making an entrance in her own newly built "splendid carriage" which incorporated plate glass from her brother's chaise, and carrying a new silver teapot by silversmith William Abdy II, although the Dundee, Perth and Cupar Advertiser wrongly states that she arrived in her brother's old carriage. She then took possession of William's townhouse in the Square. Blair (1848) suggests that Jackson's miserly habit began at this point, because she had to make up for the money spent on the suit and on paying off the fifteen Hodgson cousins. Jackson was thereafter a "litigious woman". Robert Mounsey, Joseph Bowman, and one other financial consultant were her only friends. Jackson was isolated but independent. According to Blair:

Early prepossessed with unfavourable notions of mankind, she kept herself isolated from the world; and although possessed of a masculine understanding, it has received no polish from education; nor did her after habits afford any opportunity of correcting the bia[s] which she had unfortunately received. It was on money, and not on men, that she depended in case of necessity;— this she esteemed the palladium of her security,— the very penates, or protectors of her existence.

According to Hallaway (1991): "In her time, Margery Jackson was attributed with a 'masculine' intelligence; today she would have enjoyed the reputation of a good business head". Jackson was known in Carlisle as "Old Margery". In spite of her wealth, she lived as a pauper in her big, roof-galleried house on the square. The windows were left dirty, closed and shuttered. "She had them once cleansed, and the event being so wonderful it was recorded in the Carlisle Journal".

We have heard of the Golden Age, the Bronze Age, the Iron Age, nor can we forget to mention the Age of Reason, but, in our apprehension, the present may fitly be called the Age of CLEANLINESS.— We cannot do ample justice to the labours of our ABIGAILS and TABITHAS, (Note: Abigail and Tabitha are characters from the Bible. In the Georgian era, an Abigail was considered to be a supportive wife or a lady-in-waiting, and a Tabitha was a charitable type of woman who did good works.) who in honour of the Assizes have given our mansions such an air of neatness and comfort;— but, omitting this, it would certainly be an unpardonable neglect in us entirely to overlook what has been done by a maiden lady (wealthy as she is ancient) who lives not a hundred miles from the central link of a chain of buildings, that at one end is denominated Scotch and the other English:— this prodigal old woman has actually been at the expense of hiring an Assistant to clean her windows; these the passenger can now discover to be of glass, and she threatens every one with a law suit who dare to venture to affirm the contrary.

Initially, Jackson kept servants, "lived a gentlewoman's life" and went out in her carriage. However she was disliked by her neighbours, who did not invite or visit her. She put her horses out to grass, she slung her carriage, wheel-less, from the carriage-house roof, and dismissed her servants. Without servants, she lived and cooked in her dirty front parlour, which retained her family's "ancient" but elegant furniture. She owned houses for rent, and two of her tenants assisted with bread-making and laundering. Her meanness sometimes carried its own punishment. A poorly-paid workman once replaced her fire-grate with one made of peat disguised with brick dust, so that it would be consumed by her next fire. At the same time, Jackson accumulated and loved gold, insisting that her rents were paid in gold or silver only. She kept the gold in an iron chest, and at her death it contained 9,000 guineas (equivalent to £581,076 in 2025). "It was a received opinion that she constantly kept loaded pistols by her; hence no attempt to break into her house was ever known".

Jackson would sew and read her Bible at home on Sundays, but did not attend Carlisle's St Cuthbert's Church, where she rented a box pew. However, having been informed that some lads had been using her pew, she arrived at the service, asserted her rights by turning them out of her pew, and promptly went home. Jackson drank brandy and port wine alone and to excess, calling them "Dr Port and Dr French". She could be disruptive, shouting, "Trash!" at those paying full price in the market, and throwing gamebirds back when sent to her by the Reverend Samuel Bateman of Newbiggin Hall, Carlisle, because "she would have none of his trash". Jackson was given to swearing, or "Billinsgate rhetoric, in which she was in no inconsiderable degree eloquent". However the drink could ameliorate her behaviour:

In this practice [of drinking], however, she never lost the use of her tongue:— this unruly member acquired fresh pliancy and renovated strength, by the application of her beloved Cogniac [sic]. But the missile of feminine vengeance was blunted by the thunder of forensic eloquence: the talismanic influence of the law could relax the muscles even of a misanthrope, and irradiate, with a smile of satisfaction, the rigid countenance of austerity itself.— What is more,— it could even relax the purse-strings of her heart;— then money had lost all its charms— it even, in her estimation, seemed to have lost its value.

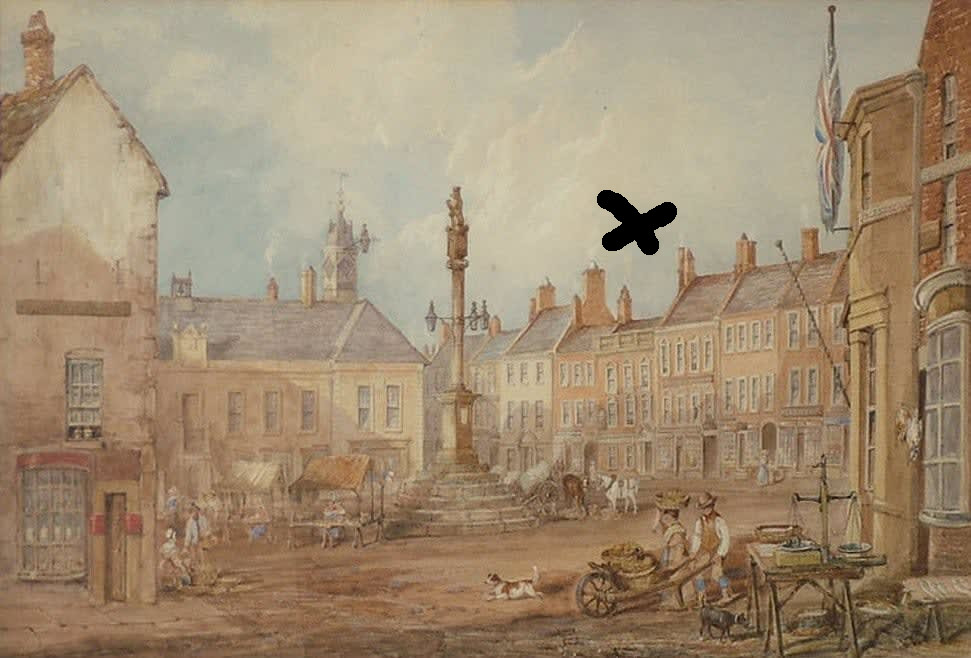
Margery Jackson's house with roof gallery, below the cross and behind the white horse, in Carlisle Market Place, 1835

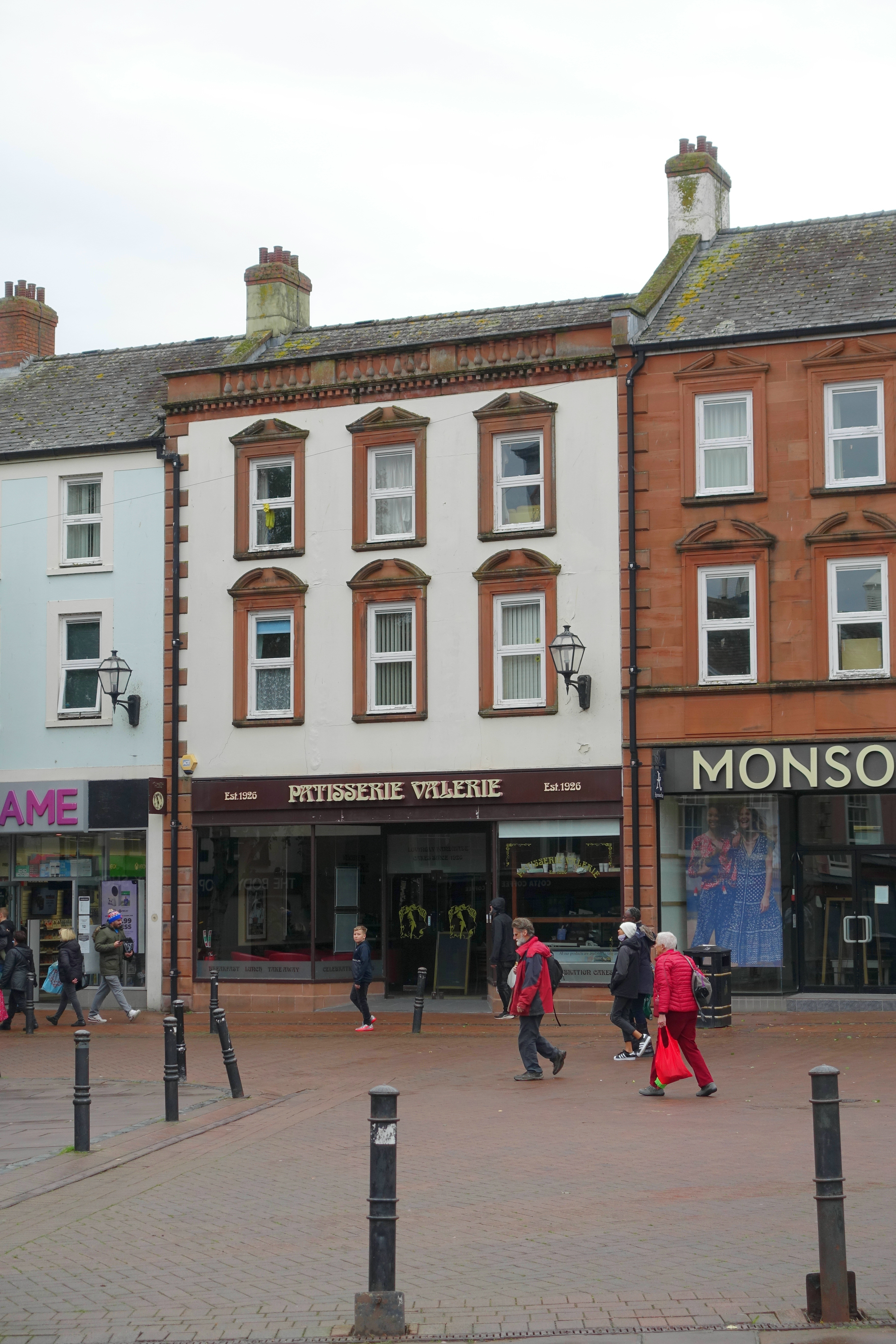
The former site of Margery Jackson's house in 2021

=== War and politics ===
Jackson was a miser; however, in 1802 she did pay out money in support of survivors of war. "On one occasion, when those victims of war, the remains of 42nd Regiment of Foot, passed through Carlisle, on their return from Egypt, she aided a subscription for them of two guineas!" (equivalent to £176.99 in 2025). On the other hand, during public celebrations following Nelson's victory of 1805, she escaped to her friend Bowman, allowing the mob to break all her windows and almost set fire to the house. She supported the Tory party, and at election time, even when they were unpopular, she would decorate her windows with yellow ribbons, and wear a yellow dress, which was the Tory party colour in Carlisle. She was a "true yellow Tory". Nevertheless, Jackson was averse to paying taxes.

=== Treatment of animals ===
Jackson was kind to her animals. She did not use her carriage for long, but she kept the two bay carriage horses. "If the old lady had any affection for living creatures, it was expended upon her darling bays; and her frequent exclamations of fondness, and her exclusive liberality towards them, proved that she had". When her servants had left and she was alone, one of her tenants cared for the horses. She cared for her dogs, too. "Her dog (when she had one) tended her daily ambulations, and when so fortunate as to find a bone, or any other eatable that would appease the longings of a hungry stomach, Margery would stand beside him, and keep off all intruders with her cane".

=== Servants ===
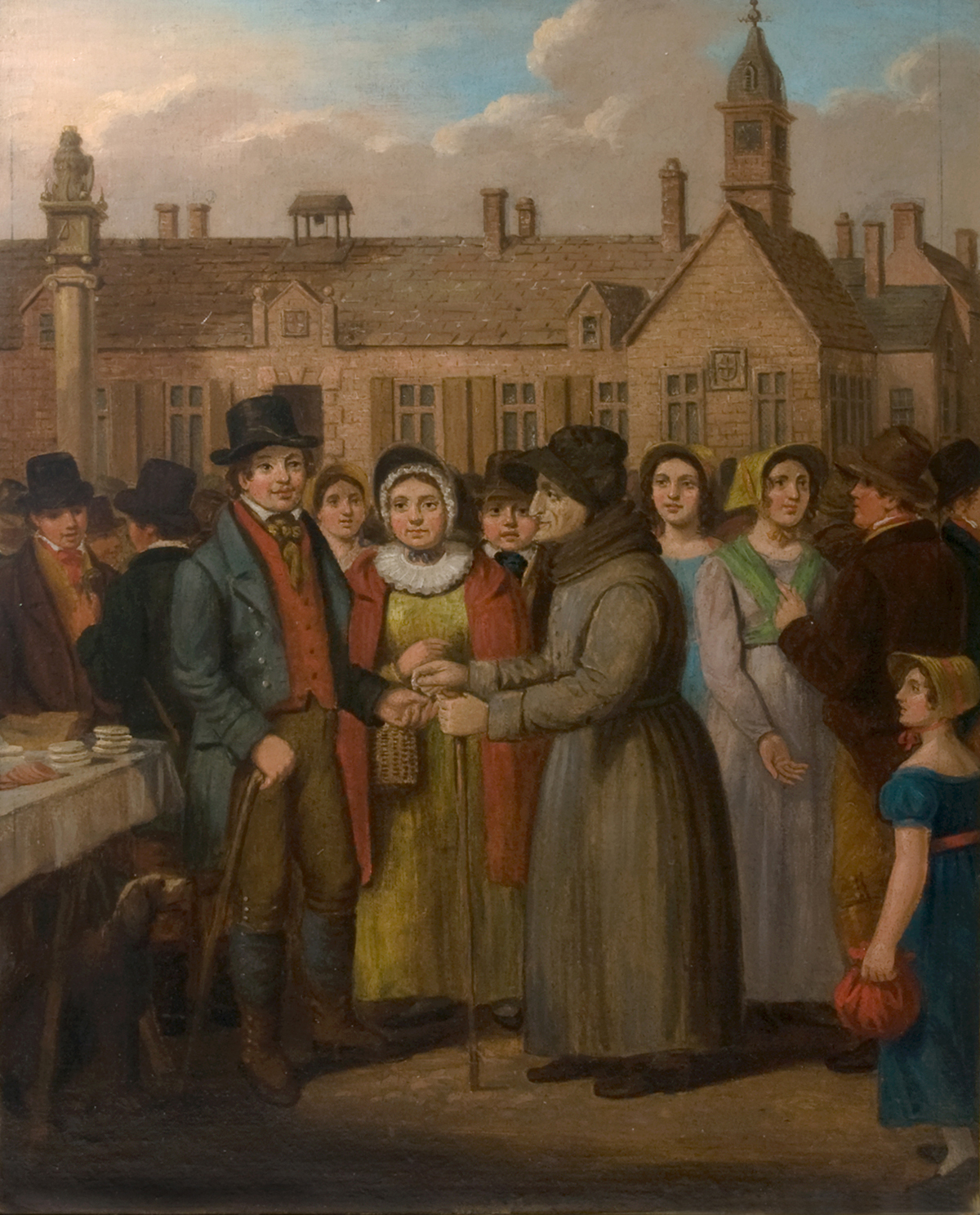
Jackson Hiring Croglin Watty at Carlisle Cross (W. Brown, circa 1811)

Jackson kept servants at her Carlisle house at first, before spending the rest of her years there alone. Some servants left after a week. "Ultimately, finding her inmates greater plagues than necessary appendages to her domicile, they were one after another dispensed with, and for many years previous to her exit, neither man, maid, dog, nor cat relieved the dull monotony of her drear abode". Daft Watty, a ballad by the Cumberland Bard, suggests that she had a frightening appearance and a beard like a billy goat, that she expected a small leg of mutton to feed the servant, the cat and her for a week, and that local children would mock her by repeatedly knocking at the door.

=== Tenants and their children ===
Jackson owned farms in Cumberland and Westmorland. She also owned a number of houses in Carlisle, many of which were rented out to tenants as single rooms at up to £6 (equivalent to £434.53 in 2025) per year. She disliked children, discouraged large families, and would lecture mothers who gave birth. Her tenant families would hide from her. Street children would snatch her cane, or "twitch her gown or coat". Boys would tie a string to her door-knocker, then run the string over the street lamp, across the road and up the Town Hall stairs – a safe place from which to pull the string to work the door-knocker. This was necessary as Jackson's response was to attempt to throw boiling water on them.

== Illness and death, 1809–1812 ==
In 1809 Jackson became infirm and unable to care for herself, and was taken "in a common cart, amongst straw" with her money box to her friend Bowman's house in Wood Street at Botcherby. Hallaway (1991) says that it took "four stout men" to lift the "iron trunk weighing a quarter of a ton (255 kilos)" into the cart. At Botcherby Jackson disturbed the family with her anger issues. At the funeral of Miss Bowman, Jackson declared, "I'm going to be mistress now". She became so ill as to give up brandy, and by the end of January 1812 she was paralysed and remained in her chair. She was said to be 90 years old when she died in Botcherby on 6 or 10 February 1812. Jackson was buried on 14 February 1812 in St Mary's churchyard, Carlisle, and hundreds of people, "attracted by curiosity", attended the funeral. (Note: Carlisle Cathedral is also Carlisle's parish church of St Mary, so Jackson may have been buried in the cathedral churchyard.)

Jackson left around £50,000 (equivalent to £3,074,476 in 2025) in assets, including £9,000 guineas (equivalent to £581,076 in 2025) in gold. The executor of and heir to most of the £50,000 was Joseph Bowman, who was required to take on the name of "Nicklson" in order to inherit. There were rumours that Jackson had not been seen to sign the will by her witnesses of 1812 when she was paralysed. One of the alternative cited heirs, Lord Avonmore, disputed the will, but he lost the case and Bowman inherited. Following Jackson's death, the tale of miserliness and the box of gold spread beyond Carlisle. In April 1812, her story was repeated (not always accurately) in newspapers across the south of England; for example: "Deaths ... at Botcherby, near Carlisle, aged 90, Miss Margery Jackson: she was a complete miser, having left 30,000L, hoarded by penury. She had in her house at the time of her decease eighteen hundred guineas in gold".

== Court mantua ==
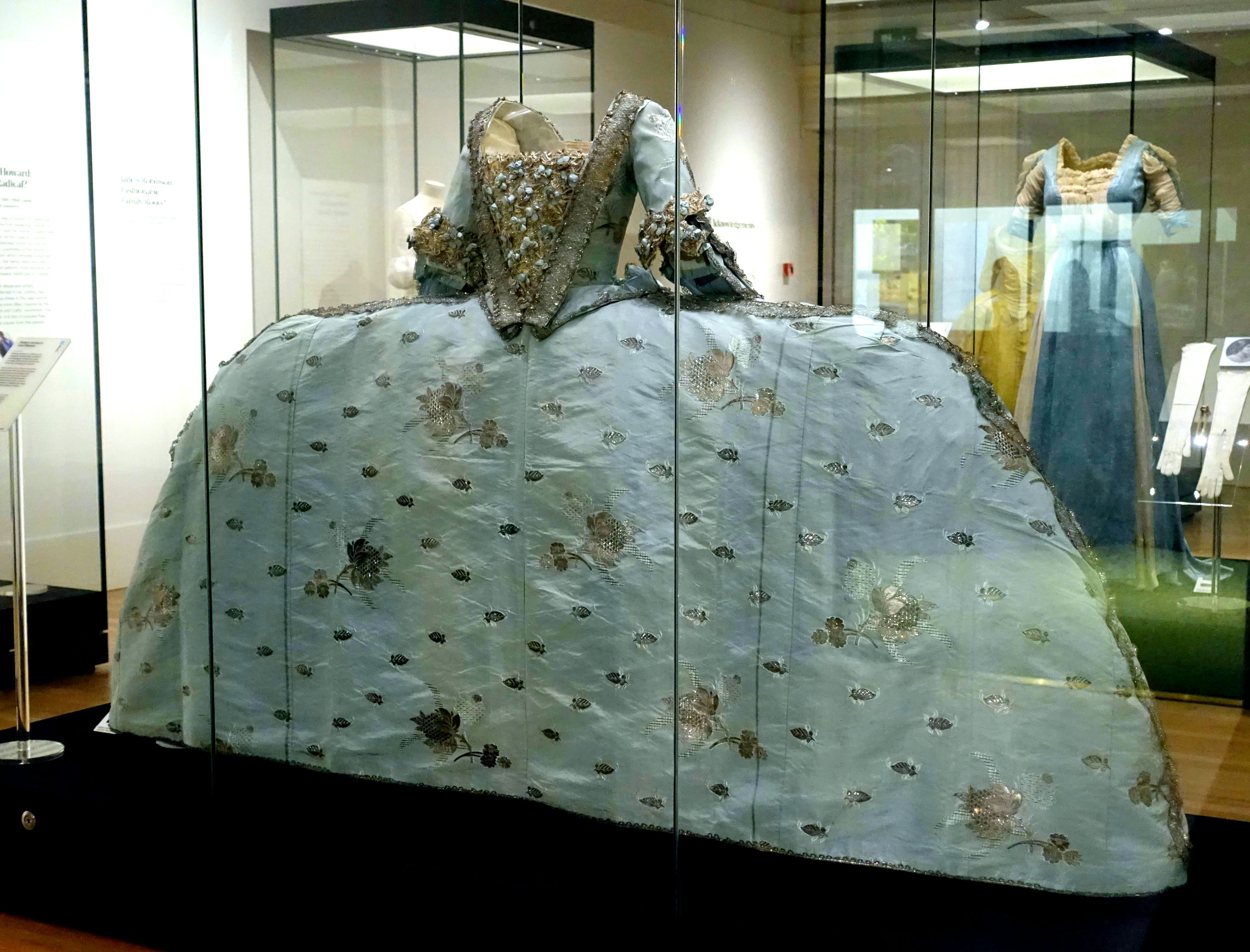
Jackson's court mantua

Tullie House Museum and Art Gallery holds a blue silk court mantua once owned by Jackson. The dress was made between 1750 and the early 1760s. Jackson would have been about 27 years old in 1750, but she was single, and such a dress was made for the use of a married woman at the royal court. The early provenance of the dress is unknown. The skirt is 2.4 metres (7.9 ft) wide. The mantua has been dated according to the shape of its hooped petticoat, which is fan-shaped in this case, but would have been more rectangular in the 1740s or late 1760s. The dress is in "pristine condition", and it retains its original stomacher and "hugely expensive" silver lace. As of 2021 it was displayed in the new costume galleries at Tullie House.

== Jackson in popular culture ==
- In the 1960s there was a confused tale of ghostly manifestations of Jackson in a "farm cottage" at Botcherby and in "houses" built on the former site of her home in Carlisle. However she did not occupy a farm cottage, and the buildings which replaced her Carlisle home in 1984 were shops, associated with The Lanes shopping precinct development. The same tale was elaborated in 2012 and 2014.
- A fictional version of Jackson's story forms the plot of the musical Miser! The Musical (2011), directed by David Day.

=== Traditional caricature ===
Jackson was described as exemplifying miserliness:

She lacked magnanimity. The Church Missionary Society, the Subscription Library and the Charity School for Daughters of Poor Freemen were not honoured by Miss Jackson's support. Appeals from the Methodist Charitable trust, Lady Glenorchie's Dissenting Chapel or the Female Visiting Society would have no success. It goes without saying that she would not be attracted by the promised intimacy of any Friendly Society. Even the compulsory parish poor rate of a pound would be produced with disgust, and the Poor Person's Dispensary inoculated reluctant toads without any financial help from this rich recluse. (Note: "Toads" was Jackson's term for children.)

Jackson exhibited "eccentric" behaviours, and it is not known to what extent the past stresses of the Chancery case influenced them. These behaviours were documented in the Statesman, and in Blair (1848), but other sources contain caricatured versions of those originals, for public consumption. This was happening in her lifetime; in 1804 the Carlisle Journal joked: "These [previously dirty windows] the passenger can now discover to be of glass, and she threatens every one with a law suit who dare to venture to affirm the contrary". The 19th-century biographer Frances Blair called her a "poor, provoked old woman", and said: "If the old lady had any affection for living creatures, it was expended upon her darling bays; and her frequent exclamations of fondness and her exclusive liberality towards them, proved that she had". However she also wrote: "The eccentricities which marked her after-life might be attributed to untoward circumstances acting upon a naturally crabbed and selfish mind", and "In her countenance might be traced earth-born care, envy, malice and hatred". Jackson's iron chest contained 9,000 guineas when she died, but as time went on that was exaggerated to £10,000 and even £30,000. Jackson continues to be caricatured for public amusement.

=== Reassessment ===
In 1991, with the publication of Hallaway's Margery Jackson, Jackson was reassessed in the context of women's place in history, although Hallaway agrees with Blair as to most historical facts, including Jackson's "comical disfigurement" of a beard. With respect to corruption, procrastination and incompetence during the London court cases, "[Jackson] must have suffered almost unbearable frustrations: here was a woman of perspicacity and lively intelligence living in an age when women were chattels and not even accorded the status of a person". Hallaway describes this reassessment in her preface, as follows:

Margery Jackson was a woman of no importance, but she was outstanding in an age when women were considered of little consequence. She had an admirable grasp of the intricacies of litigation and unshakeable tenacity. But "give a dog a bad name and hang him", one cannot but feel a sympathy for Margery. In her time, honesty and integrity had quite different meanings, yet she was wholly honest and truthful, and absolutely just. Her reputation, so far, has depended on the biased, sanctimonious, and inaccurate biography produced by the daughter of the spiteful owner of the local newspaper. Mrs Blair (née Jollie) never knew Margery Jackson, but condemned her as a "creature forever removed from the land of hope". As for her fellow citizens of Carlisle Margery summed them up exactly: "... what", she wondered, "the people there will do when I die for a subject of chat?"

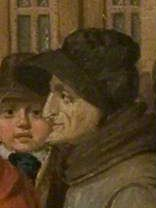
Jackson caricatured with exaggerated chin (Brown, c. 1811)

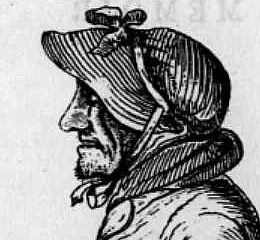
Jackson caricatured with unfeminine features, including a beard (Macmillan, 1848)
