= Dalston baronets =

Extinct baronetcy in the Baronetage of England

The Baronetcy of Dalston of Dalston was created in the Baronetage of England on 15 February 1641 for William Dalston of Dalston Hall, near Carlisle, Cumbria.

The Dalston family were descended from Hubert de Vaux, Lord Gillesland and Baron of Dalston about the time of the Norman Conquest. In the 17th century they strongly supported the Royalist cause. Sir John Dalston and his son Sir George Dalston (father of the first Baronet) both served as High Sheriff of Cumberland during the reign of James I. The latter represented Cumberland in the Long Parliament of 1640.

The first Baronet was Member of Parliament for Carlisle 1640-44 and High Sheriff of Cumberland in 1665. Latterly his seat was at Heath Hall, Yorkshire. The second Baronet, who was knighted in 1663, prior to his succession, served as High Sheriff of Cumberland in 1661.

The Baronetcy was extinct on the death of the fourth Baronet in 1765. He had sold the estates in 1761.

== Dalston of Dalston (1641) ==
- Sir William Dalston, 1st Baronet (died 1683)
- Sir John Dalston, 2nd Baronet (died 1711)
- Sir Charles Dalston, 3rd Baronet (died 1723)
- Sir George Dalston, 4th Baronet (died 1765)
