= List of mayors of Carlisle =

The role of Mayor of Carlisle dates from 1231. Originally the mayor was elected by the Freemen of the borough but since 1835 has been chosen by elected councillors.

== List of mayors ==
The following were mayors of Carlisle, Cumbria, England:

=== Before 20th century ===
- 1545: Edward Aglionby, MP for Carlisle, 1529.High Sheriff of Cumberland, 1544
- 1554: Robert Dalton, MP for Carlisle, 1558
- 1566–67: Robert Dalton
- Several times. Edward Aglionby, MP for 1584 and 1593
- 1597: Thomas Blennerhassett, MP for Carlisle, 1584, 1586 and 1604
- 1636 and 1648: Richard Barwis, MP for Carlisle, 1628, 1640
- 1672: Sir Christopher Musgrave, 4th Baronet, MP for Carlisle, 1661; Westmorland, 1690; Appleby, 1695
- 1683: Edward Howard, 2nd Earl of Carlisle, MP for Cumberland, 1679; Carlisle, 1681
- 1715: Thomas Stanwix, Governor of Gibraltar
- 1844-55: James Steel (1797–1851), editor of the Carlisle Journal
- 1855-1883-: Robert Ferguson, MP for Carlisle, 1874
- 1883-1899: Francis Peter Dixon

=== 20th century ===
- Primary source: Carlisle Encyclopaedia
- 1899–1900 Christopher Ling
- 1900–1901: John Hurst
- 1901–02: Benjamin Scott
- 1902–03: John Maxwell
- 1903–04: Frederick William Chance (MP for Carlisle, 1905–10)
- 1904–05: Francis Peter Dixon
- 1905–07: William Irwin Robert Crowder
- 1907–08: William Nanson Donald
- 1908–09: William Bell Maxwell
- 1909–10: William Phillips
- 1910–11: Sir Benjamin Scott
- 1911–12: Matthew Johnstone (died in office - Sir Benjamin Scott stepped in for the remainder of the term)
- 1912–14: Spencer Charles Ferguson (son of Richard Saul Ferguson)
- 1914–15: Francis Peter Dixon
- 1915–16: Walter Phelp Gibbings
- 1916–17: Joseph Pattinson Buck
- 1917–19: Bertram Carr
- 1919–20: Thomas Ridley
- 1920–21: Henry Kenyon Campbell
- 1921–22: Archibald Creighton (Liberal PPC for Carlisle, 1929)
- 1922–23: Robert Dalton
- 1923–24: Hubert Woodville
- 1924–25: Robert Burns
- 1925–26: George Edward Edmondson
- 1926–27: Archibald Creighton (second term)
- 1927–28: Joseph Henderson
- 1928–29: Thomas Gardhouse Charlton
- 1929–30: Sir Robert Christopher Chance (son of former mayor Frederick William Chance)
- 1930–31: Frederick William Tassell
- 1931–32: Matthew Thompson
- 1932–33: Herbert Atkinson
- 1933–34: Ebenezer Gray
- 1934–35: James Cuthbert Studholme
- 1935–36: John Robert Potts
- 1936–37: Richard Stanley Harrison
- 1937–38: John Walker Osborne
- 1938–39: Tom Dobinson
- 1939–41: Matthew Thompson
- 1941–42: Edgar Grierson (MP for Carlisle, 1945–50)
- 1942–44: Alexander C. G. Thomson
- 1944–45: Wilfred Goody
- 1945–46: Isa Graham
- 1946–47: Harold Greenop
- 1947–49: Elizabeth Welsh
- 1949–50: Gerald Sheehan
- 1950–51: Albert Henry Dawson Partridge
- 1951–52: George Henry Routledge
- 1952–53: George Bowman
- 1953–54: Alfred Clement Redvers Punnett
- 1954–55: Thomas Dawson Lancaster
- 1955–56: Harold Nelson Sutcliffe
- 1956–57: Ritson Graham
- 1957–58: Jessie Martin
- 1958–59: Irving Burrow
- 1959–60: William John Hunter
- 1960–61: Thomas Souness
- 1961–62: Thomas Logie MacDonald, astronomer
- 1962–63: Francis Derry
- 1963–64: David Moffat Hamilton
- 1964–65: Howard Glaister
- 1965–66: James Smith
- 1966–67: Gerard Joseph Coogan
- 1967–68: Mary Kathleen Sibson
- 1968–69: Joseph Jackson Bell
- 1969–70: John Hayhurst
- 1970–71: Noel Thomas O'Reilly
- 1971–72: Herbert Fawcett
- 1972–73: Archibald Caven
- 1973–74: Hugh Little
- 1974–75: Thomas Johnson
- 1975–76: Thomas MacMillan Bisland
- 1976–77: George Edward Dudson
- 1977–78: Jim Long
- 1978–79: Gordon Henry Griffiths
- 1979–80: David Weedall
- 1980–81: Walter Sydney Bell
- 1981–82: Alan Graham
- 1982–83: Donald Fell
- 1983–84: Trudy Whalley
- 1984–85: Ian Stockdale
- 1985–86: Keith Aitken
- 1986–87: Harry Gallagher
- 1987–88: Victor Davis
- 1988–89: Cyril Weber
- 1989–90: R. C. Hayhoe
- 1990–91: John Amos
- 1991–92: Elsie Coleman
- 1992–93: Harold Evans
- 1993–94: Jayne Prewitt
- 1994–95: Colin Paisley
- 1995–96: Alfred Brumwell
- 1996–97: Craig Johnston
- 1997–98: John Metcalfe
- 1998–99: Heather Bradley, musician
- 1999–2000: John Collier

=== 21st century ===
- source (2000-2008): Carlisle Encyclopaedia
- 2000–01: Ray Knapton
- 2001–02: Doreen Parsons
- 2002–03: Alan Toole
- 2003–04: Judith Pattinson
- 2004–05: Ralph Aldersey
- 2005–06: Sandra Fisher
- 2006–07: Peter Farmer
- 2007–08: Elizabeth Mallinson
- 2008–09: Jacqui Geddes
- 2009–10: William Graham
- 2010–11: Mary Styth
- 2011–12: Barry Ogilvie Earp
- 2012–13: David Wilson
- 2013–14: Ray Bloxham
- 2014–15: Steven Bowditch
- 2015–16: Steve Layden
- 2016-17: Colin Stothard
- 2017-18: Trish Vasey
- 2018-19: Jessica Riddle
- 2019-2021: Marilyn Bowman (extended period due to the COVID-19 pandemic)
- 2021-2022: Pamela Birks
- 2022-2023: Mike Mitchelson
- 2023-2024: Abdul Harid
- 2024-2025: Christopher Southward
- 2025-present: Jeanette Whalen
