= Sir George Dalston, 4th Baronet =

British politician and baronet

Sir George Dalston Bt

Member of Parliament for Westmorland
- In office 1754–1761

Sheriff of Cumberland
- In office 1752–1753

Personal details
- Born: Baptized 13 July 1718
- Died: 7 March 1765
- Spouse: Anne Huxley
- Education: Westminster School
- Occupation: Naval officer and politician

Military service
- Allegiance: Kingdom of Great Britain
- Branch/service: Royal Navy
- Years of service: 1735–1742
- Rank: Lieutenant

Sir George Dalston, 4th Baronet (c. 13 July 1718 – 7 March 1765) was a British baronet. He inherited the title from his father at a young age, and subsequently joined the Royal Navy, in which he served until 1742, reaching the rank of lieutenant. In 1754 he was elected to the parliamentary seat of Westmorland at the behest of his relations the Lowther family. Unaligned throughout his time in politics, Dalston retired in 1761 amidst increasing financial difficulties. He sold his seat of Dalston Hall soon afterwards, and died in relative poverty in 1765. Having only a daughter from his marriage, the baronetcy died with him.

== Naval career ==
George Dalston was born in the first half of 1718 and baptized on 13 July 1718, the son of Sir Charles Dalston, 3rd Baronet and his wife Susan née Blake. On 5 March 1723 his father died, leaving Dalston to inherit his baronetcy. Having been educated at Westminster School between 1727 and 1733, he enrolled as a scholar at the Royal Naval Academy on 1 May 1735, and on 29 July 1737 he joined the 50-gun fourth-rate HMS Gloucester as a volunteer. Gloucester sailed to join the Mediterranean Fleet soon afterwards. Dalston was promoted to midshipman and sent to join the 20-gun frigate HMS Dursley Galley, which was also part of the fleet, on 19 September. He returned to Gloucester as a volunteer on 12 October, and became a midshipman again, this time still on Gloucester, on 20 October 1738. Dalston transferred as a midshipman to the 54-gun fourth-rate HMS Chester on 17 March 1739 or 1740, still in the Mediterranean.

Dalston moved ships again on 10 April 1740, this time to the newly commissioned 70-gun ship of the line HMS Prince Frederick, which was part of the Channel Fleet. He stayed in Prince Frederick for around six months before being transferred to the 70-gun ship of the line HMS Nassau on 3 October, just before Prince Frederick sailed to the West Indies Station. While serving in Nassau Dalston passed his examination for promotion to the rank of lieutenant on 6 May 1741, and in 1742 the ship sailed to the Mediterranean. There on 20 January, he was sent to the 80-gun ship of the line HMS Russell to serve as her fourth lieutenant. His stint in Russell was short, as he left her on 23 April of the same year. This was his last service in the Royal Navy.

== Political career ==
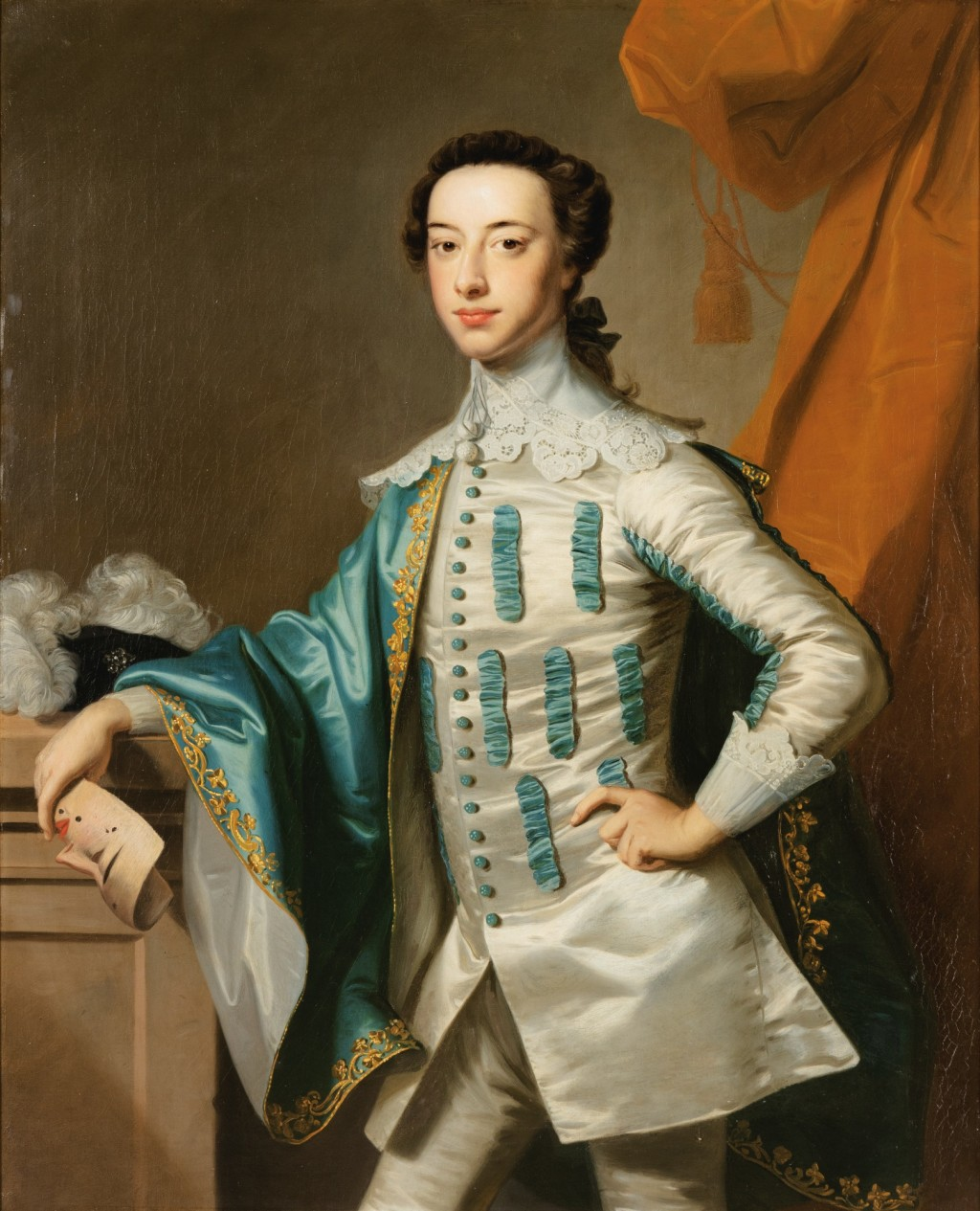
Sir James Lowther, political ally of Dalston

Dalston's first public position came in 1752 when he served a one-year term as Sheriff of Cumberland. In 1754 Dalston began a career in politics when he was elected unopposed to the parliamentary seat of Westmorland. This was brought about by the Lowther family, relations of Dalston, who paid for his election at the cost of £628 15s 9d. Dalston was not politically aligned with any one group in parliament, and was classed by the Tory Viscount Dupplin as "doubtful". Dalston stayed close to his family, organising the election of Sir William Fleming to the seat of Cumberland on 19 May 1756. For this he was paid £200 by Sir James Lowther.

In early 1757 Fleming died and the Cumberland seat was open again. This time it was decided that Lowther himself would run for election, but it was thought that if he personally turned out on 27 April for the voting it would look like a sign of respect for his opponents. Instead Dalston served as his proxy at the event, and Lowther won the seat. When the 1761 British general election was called Dalston did not stand for re-election, and Lowther replaced him with John Upton.

By the time of Dalston's retirement from politics he had come into severe financial difficulties, and in June of the same year he sold his family seat of Dalston Hall to the London grocer Monkhouse Davison for £5,060, and also rid himself of several other properties in the Cumberland area. At Christmas Dalston began to receive a £200 annual income from the government to help alleviate his difficulties, but he lost this when the Duke of Newcastle relinquished his position as prime minister in May 1762. Dalston had also been drawing a small income as lieutenant-colonel of the Yorkshire militia, but this unit was disbanded at around the same time and he thus lost two of his major sources of income in short order. Sir John Ramsden commented that these losses would "totally break [Dalston's] back", and that his finances were very dilapidated. Dalston died, having failed to rescue his income, on 7 March 1765. He was buried on 9 March at Warmfield.

== Family ==
Dalston married Anne Huxley, the daughter of the commissary general George Huxley, on 28 October 1742. Together they had one daughter, Elizabeth, on 21 April 1751. She married a French officer named Captain Theobald Dillon. Having no male heir, Dalston's baronetcy went extinct upon his death.

== Citations ==
Parliament of Great Britain
| Preceded by Edward Wilson; John Dalston | Member of Parliament for Westmorland; 1754–1761; With: John Dalston; Robert Lowther | Succeeded by Sir James Lowther; John Upton |
Baronetage of England
| Preceded by Charles Dalston | Baronet (of Dalston); 1723–1765 | Extinct |
