= William Aglionby (MP) =

English politician

William Aglionby (fl. 1362–1406) was an English politician. He sat as MP for Carlisle in 1385 and February 1388.

He was the son and heir of Adam Aglionby of Carlisle (died after 1376) and his wife Juliana. By 28 October 1380, he was married to Mary, who was possibly the daughter of Alan Blennerhasset of Carlisle.
