= Ronald Lewis (British politician) =

British politician

Member of Parliament for Carlisle
- In office 15 October 1964 – 18 May 1987
- Preceded by: Donald Johnson
- Succeeded by: Eric Martlew

Personal details
- Born: 16 July 1909
- Died: 18 June 1990 (aged 80)
- Party: Labour

Ronald Howard Lewis (16 July 1909 – 18 June 1990) was a Labour Party politician in the United Kingdom.

Lewis studied at Cliff Methodist College and became a Methodist local preacher. He served in the Middle East with the Royal Army Service Corps during World War II. He worked in the shops section of British Railways and served as a councillor on Derbyshire County Council from 1949 and on Blackwell Rural District Council from 1950.

Lewis contested Rugby in 1945, Crosby in 1950, West Derbyshire in 1951, Northamptonshire South in 1955 and Darlington in 1959. He was member of parliament for Carlisle from 1964 until he retired in 1987. In 1983, Carlisle was the most marginal Labour seat in the country – with Lewis finishing just 71 votes ahead of the Conservative candidate.

His successor was Eric Martlew.

Parliament of the United Kingdom
Preceded by Donald Johnson	Member of Parliament for Carlisle; 1964–1987	Succeeded by Eric Martlew
