= Hugh Aglionby =

16th-century English politician

Hugh Aglionby (died between 1552 and 1554), of London, was an English politician.

== Career ==
Aglionby was a Member of Parliament (MP) for Carlisle in 1545. He held the office of Comptroller of the Mint from 8 March 1542 to 25 March 1544. He was a clerk of the council to Queen Catherine Parr by September 1544 and his term as clerk ended by 8 August 1548, when his successor was in office.

== Personal life ==
Aglionby was possibly the son of Edward Aglionby, MP for Carlisle. Before May 1550, he married a woman named Anne. They had one daughter and at least one son, Thomas Aglionby, who was also an MP.

Aglionby was alive in 1552 but was dead by 15 June 1554 when Queen Mary reaffirmed an annuity to his widow.
