= Richard Barwis =

English politician

Richard Barwis (1601 – 13 April 1648) was an English politician who sat in the House of Commons of England between 1628 and 1648. He supported the Parliamentarian side during the English Civil War. He was known as "Great Richard" Barwis because of his remarkable strength.

Barwis was the son of Anthony Barwis (1580–1616) and his wife Grace Fleming, daughter of William Fleming of Rydal. He lived at Ilekirk Hall.

In 1628, Barwis was elected Member of Parliament for Carlisle and held the seat until 1629 when King Charles decided to rule without parliament. In 1634 he leased the Crosscanonby Salt Pans for 21 years on a lease which included plans for the construction of saltpans and cottages. He was High Sheriff of Cumberland in 1635 and Mayor of Carlisle for 1636–37 and 1648–49.

Barwis was re-elected MP for Carlisle in April 1640 for the Short Parliament and in November 1640 for the Long Parliament and held the seat until his death in 1648. In summer 1645, in an incident known as the "Barwis Affair", Barwis and his associates were accused by the Scots commissioners in London of protecting royalist delinquents and of depriving the Scottish forces in the area of proper maintenance.

Barwis was so strong that he was known as "Great Richard" and stories have been passed down of his exploits. There is a large stone at Ilekirk which it is claimed he could easily throw the length of the courtyard. He is said to have walked round the courtyard of Ilekirk Hall, carrying, at arm's length, his wife on one hand, and an enormous stone on the other. It is also said that he once walked along Eden Bridge, at Carlisle, holding his wife seated on his hand held over the battlements.

Barwis died at the age of 47.

Barwis married Frances Musgrave, daughter of Sir Edward Musgrave of Hayton Castle. He died without issue. He had an uncle John Barwis of Waverton (d. 1662), who was High Sheriff of Cumberland in 1648, 1649 and 1652, and whose son Colonel Thomas Barwis (1621–1648) fought on the Parliamentary side at the siege of Carlisle.

Parliament of England
| Preceded by Henry Vane the elder Richard Graham | Member of Parliament for Carlisle; 1628–1629; With: Richard Graham | Parliament suspended until 1640 |
| Vacant Parliament suspended since 1629 | Member of Parliament for Carlisle; 1640–1648; With: Sir William Dalston, Bt | Not replaced |
