= Sir Richard Graham, 1st Baronet =

English politician

Sir Richard Graham, 1st Baronet of Esk (c. 1583 - 28 January 1654) was an English courtier and politician elected to the House of Commons (1626 to 1629). He fought in the English Civil War for the royalist army.

== Family ==
Graham was the second son of Fergus Graham (sometimes, Grahme) of Plump, Kirkandrews-upon-Esk, in Cumberland, and Sybilla Bell, daughter of William Bell of Scotsbrig, Middlebie. His siblings included four or more younger brothers: William Graham, of Plomp; Francis Graham; Reginald Graham, of Nunnington; Matthew Graham; and one sister, Elizabeth Scott.

By 1624, Graham married Catharine Musgrave (~1602-1660), daughter of Thomas Musgrave, of Cumcatch, Cumberland and his wife, Ursula Carnaby. Together they had two sons and five daughters.

== Career ==
Graham served as Gentleman of the Horse to George Villiers, 1st Duke of Buckingham from 1617. On 18 February 1623 he set out with Buckingham and Prince Charles, who assumed the names Tom and James Smith to travel incognito to Madrid to meet the Infanta, an expedition known as the Spanish Match.

In 1624, Graham bought the manor of Norton Conyers in the North Riding of Yorkshire.

In 1626, he was elected Member of Parliament for Carlisle. He was re-elected MP for Carlisle in 1628 and sat until 1629, at which time King Charles decided to rule without parliament, for eleven years. He was knighted in January 1629 and in March 1629 entitled baronet of Esk, Cumberland. He purchased the estate of Netherby and the Barony of Liddell in Cumberland.

Graham become a equerry in the royal stables, and in 1644 master of the harriers. During the Wars of the Three Kingdoms (1639 – 1653), Graham supported the Royalist cause. On 2 July 1644, he fought in the Battle of Marston Moor and suffered serious injuries.

== Later life ==
Lady Catherine died 23 March 1650 and is buried at Wath Upon Dearne in Yorkshire. Graham died 28 January 1654 and was buried beside his wife on 11 February 1654.

Graham's eldest son and heir was George Graham (died 1658), 2nd Baronet of Esk and Netherby. He married Mary, the daughter of James Johnstone, 1st Earl of Hartfell, and Lady Margaret Douglas. A younger son, Richard Graham (1635-1711), became 1st Baronet of Norton Conyers, and married Elizabeth Fortescue, daughter of Cololonel Sir Chichester Fortescue and Lady Elizabeth (Slingsby).

Parliament of England
Preceded by Sir Henry Vane; Edward Aglionby	Member of Parliament for Carlisle; 1626–1629; With: Sir Henry Vane 1626; Richard Barwis 1628–1629	Parliament suspended until 1640
Baronetage of England
New creation	Baronet (of Esk); 1629–1654	Succeeded by George Graham
