= William Cardoile =

English politician

William Cardoile (fl. 1412–1445) was an English politician. He sat as MP for Carlisle in November 1414 and 1417.

He also served as bailiff of Carlisle from c. October 1412 till 1413, 1418 till 1419, 1421 till 1422, 1423 till 1426, 1427 till 1428, 1431 till 1432, 1433 till 1434, 1435 till 1436, 1439 till 1440, and 1443 till 1444; and coroner of Cumberland c. 1419 till 20 October 1431.
