= Carlisle (constituency) =

Parliamentary constituency in the United Kingdom, 1295 onwards

Coordinates: 54.879°N 2.937°W

- County constituency for the House of Commons
- Interactive map of boundaries since 2024
- Location within North West England
- County: Cumbria
- Population: 85,979 (2011 census)
- Electorate: 75,868 (March 2020)
- Major settlements: Carlisle

Current constituency
- Created: 1295
- Member of Parliament: Julie Minns (Labour)
- Seats: 1295–1885: Two; 1885–present: One

Carlisle is a constituency (Note: A borough constituency (for the purposes of election expenses and type of returning officer)) in Cumbria represented in the House of Commons of the UK Parliament since 2024 by Julie Minns of the Labour Party. (Note: As with all constituencies, the constituency elects one Member of Parliament (MP) by the first past the post system of election at least every five years – from 1295 until 1885 it had the right to send two MPs in most years.)

== Constituency profile ==
The Carlisle constituency is located in Cumbria. It includes the city of Carlisle and the rural areas to its north and east stretching to the border with Scotland. Other settlements include the small market towns of Brampton and Longtown. Carlisle is a historic city with a population of around 78,000, and was an important military stronghold as a result of its position close to the Anglo-Scottish border. The city is a major railway hub and, during the Industrial Revolution, was a densely-populated mill town.

House prices in the constituency are generally low and residents have lower levels of income, education and professional employment compared to national averages. Carlisle has high levels of deprivation whilst the rural areas surrounding the city are more affluent. White people make up 97% of the population. At the local council level, Carlisle is mostly represented by Labour Party councillors whilst the rural parts of the constituency elected Conservative and Liberal Democrat representatives. Most voters favoured leaving the European Union in the 2016 referendum with an estimated 60% in favour of Brexit compared to 52% nationally.

== History ==
Carlisle has existed as a seat since the Model Parliament in 1295, returning two MPs to the House of Commons until 1885, when its representation was reduced to one MP by the Redistribution of Seats Act 1885. Under the 2023 boundary review the seat was expanded considerably into the border regions of Cumbria and redesignated as a county constituency.

From 1885 to 1922 the constituency was represented by the Liberal Party, since when it has alternated between Labour and Conservative, changing hands nine times. It was represented by Labour Party MPs from 1964 to 2010, albeit with a slim 0.2% majority in 1983. It was gained by John Stevenson of the Conservative Party in 2010 who held it until 2024, when it was won back by Julie Minns for Labour.

== Boundaries ==
Map of boundaries 2010–2024

=== Historic ===
1918–1955: The County Borough of Carlisle.

1955–1983: As 1918 but with redrawn boundaries.

1983–1997: The City of Carlisle wards of Belah, Belle Vue, Botcherby, Currock, Denton Holme, Harraby, Morton, St Aidan's, Stanwix Urban, Trinity, Upperby, and Yewdale.

1997–2010: The City of Carlisle wards of Belah, Belle Vue, Botcherby, Burgh, Currock, Dalston, Denton Holme, Harraby, Morton, St Aidan's, St Cuthbert Without, Stanwix Urban, Trinity, Upperby, and Yewdale.

2010–2024: The City of Carlisle wards of Belah, Belle Vue, Botcherby, Burgh, Castle, Currock, Dalston, Denton Holme, Harraby, Morton, St Aidan's, Stanwix Urban, Upperby, Wetheral, and Yewdale.

=== Current ===
The 2023 review of Westminster constituencies was carried out using the local authority structure as it existed in Cumbria on 1 December 2020 and is officially defined as:

- The City of Carlisle wards of: Belah & Kingmoor; Botcherby & Harraby North; Brampton & Fellside; Cathedral & Castle; Currock & Upperby; Denton Holme & Morton South; Harraby South & Parklands; Longtown & the Border; Newtown & Morton North; Sandsfield & Morton West; Stanwix & Houghton; Wetheral & Corby.

With effect from 1 April 2023, the City of Carlisle council was abolished and absorbed into the new unitary authority of Cumberland. Consequently, the constituency now comprises the following with effect from the 2024 general election:

- The Cumberland wards of Belah, Belle Vue, Botcherby, Brampton, Castle, Corby and Hayton, Currock, Dalston and Burgh (small part), Denton Holme, Harraby North, Harraby South, Houghton and Irthington, Longtown, Morton, Stanwix Urban, Upperby, Wetheral (majority), and Yewdale.

The constituency was expanded to bring the electorate within the permitted range by transferring the parts of the former City of Carlisle local authority previously in the abolished constituency of Penrith and The Border - comprising the towns of Brampton and Longtown and surrounding villages and rural areas. To partly offset this, Dalston was included in the new constituency of Penrith and Solway.

== Members of Parliament ==
=== MPs 1295–1640 ===
Parliament	First member	Second member
1381	John de Blennerhassett	
1384	John de Blennerhassett	
1386	Adam Denton	Robert Bristowe
1388 (Feb)	Robert Carlisle	William Aglionby
1388 (Sep)	John Corkeby	Nicholas Leveson
1390 (Jan)	John Monceaux	Alan Kirkebridge
1390 (Nov)	Bobby Cowing	Kieran Nobin
1391	John Monceaux	Robert Bristowe
1393	John Redesdale	John Werk
1394		Joseph Maughan
1395	John Monceaux	John Burgham
1397 (Jan)	John Helton	John Burgham
1397 (Sep)	Robert Bristowe	John Bristowe
1399	John Helton	Robert Bristowe
1401	Thomas Bolton	Robert Bristowe
1402	John Sowerby	William Boweson
1404 (Jan)	Mark Cooke	Joshusoia Kirkpatrick
1404 (Oct)		
1406		
1407		
1410	[Robert] Carlisle	
1411		
1413 (Feb)		
1413 (May)	Robert Carlisle	Ralph de Blenerhayset
1414 (Apr)		
1414 (Nov)	Robert Carlisle	William Cardoile
1415		
1416 (Mar)	Robert Lancaster	William Bell
1416 (Oct)		
1417	Robert Carlisle	William Cardoile
1419	Robert Carlisle	Thomas Manningham
1420	Thomas Derley	Richard Muncaster
1421 (May)	Robert Carlisle	Thomas Pety
1421 (Dec)	William Manchester	John Thompson
1441	John Blenerhayset	
1510–1523	No names known	
1529	Edward Aglionby	John Coldale
1536	?	
1539	?	
1542	William Stapleton	?
1545	Hugh Aglionby	Robert Smith
1547	Edward Aglionby	Thomas Dalston, died and replaced Jan 1552 by Edward Aglionby
1553 (Mar)	Edward Aglionby	John Dudley
1553 (Oct)	John Aglionby	Simon Brisco
1554 (Apr)	Robert Wheatley	Richard Mynsho
1554 (Nov)	Robert Wheatley	Richard Mynsho
1555	William Middleton	William Ward
1558	Richard Assheton	Robert Dalton
1558–9	John or Edward Aglionby	Richard Mulcaster
1563 (Jan)	Richard Assheton	William Mulcaster
1571	Robert Bowes	Christopher Musgrave
1572	Thomas Pattenson	Robert Mulcaster, died and repl. 1576 by Thomas Tallentyne, who also died and was repl. Mar 1579 by Thomas Barne
1584	Edward Aglionby	Thomas Blennerhassett
1586	Henry Macwilliam, died and repl. 1587 by William Bowyer	Thomas Blennerhassett
1588 (Oct)	Henry Scrope	John Dalston
1593	Henry Scrope	Edward Aglionby
1597 (Sep)	Henry Scrope	Thomas Sandford
1601 (Oct)	Henry Scrope	John Dudley
1604	Thomas Blennerhassett	William Barwick
1614	George Butler	Nathaniel Tomkins
1621	Sir Henry Vane	George Butler
1624	Sir Henry Vane	Edward Aglionby
1625	Sir Henry Vane	Edward Aglionby
1626	Sir Henry Vane	Richard Graham
1628	Richard Barwis	Richard Graham
1629–1640	No Parliaments summoned	

Long Parliament

- 1640–1644: Sir William Dalston, Bt (Royalist) – disabled to sit, January 1644
- 1640–1648 : Richard Barwis (Parliamentarian) – died April 1648
- 1645(?)–1648(?): Thomas Cholmley – not recorded as having sat after Pride's Purge, December 1648
- 1649: Edward Howard, 1st Baron Howard of Escrick, from House of Lords
- 1653: Carlisle was unrepresented in the Barebones Parliament.

First Protectorate Parliament (One member only)

- 1654–1655: Colonel Thomas Fitch

Second Protectorate Parliament (One member only)

- 1656–1658: George Downing

Third Protectorate Parliament

- 1659: George Downing
- 1659: Thomas Craister

Long Parliament (restored)

- 1659–1660: Thomas Cholmley
- 1659–1660: Edward Howard, 1st Baron Howard of Escrick

=== MPs 1660–1885 ===
Election	First member	First party	Second member	Second party
1660	William Briscoe		Jeremiah Tolhurst	
1661	Sir Christopher Musgrave, Bt		Sir Philip Howard	
1681	Sir Christopher Musgrave, Bt		Edward Howard	
1685	Sir Christopher Musgrave, Bt		James Grahme	
1689	Sir Christopher Musgrave, Bt		Jeremiah Bubb	
1690	Christopher Musgrave		Jeremiah Bubb	
1692	Christopher Musgrave		William Lowther	
1694	Christopher Musgrave		James Lowther	
1695	William Howard		James Lowther	
1701	Philip Howard	Whig	James Lowther	
1702	Christopher Musgrave		Thomas Stanwix	Whig
1705	Sir James Montagu		Thomas Stanwix	Whig
1708	Sir James Montagu		Thomas Stanwix	Whig
1710	Sir James Montagu		Thomas Stanwix	Whig
1713	Sir Christopher Musgrave, Bt	Tory	Thomas Stanwix	Whig
1715	William Strickland	Whig	Thomas Stanwix	Whig
1721	William Strickland	Whig	Henry Aglionby	
1722	James Bateman	Tory	Henry Aglionby	
1727	Charles Howard		John Hylton	Tory
1734	Charles Howard		John Hylton	Tory
1741	Charles Howard		John Stanwix	Whig
1742	Charles Howard		John Hylton	Tory
1746	Charles Howard		John Stanwix	Whig
1747	Charles Howard		John Stanwix	Whig
1761	Raby Vane		Henry Curwen	
1768	Lord Edward Bentinck		George Musgrave	
1774	Anthony Storer		Fletcher Norton	
1775	Anthony Storer		Walter Spencer-Stanhope	
1780	Earl of Surrey		William Lowther	
1784	Earl of Surrey		Edward Norton	
April 1786	Earl of Surrey		John Lowther	
May 1786	Earl of Surrey		John Christian	Whig
November 1786	Edward Knubley		John Christian	Whig
1787	Rowland Stephenson		John Christian	Whig
1790	James Clarke Satterthwaite		Edward Knubley	
1791	Wilson Braddyll		John Christian Curwen	Whig
1796	Sir Frederick Fletcher-Vane, Bt	Whig	John Christian Curwen	Whig
1802	Walter Spencer-Stanhope	Tory	John Christian Curwen	Whig
1812	Sir James Graham, 1st Bt	Tory	Henry Fawcett	
1816	Sir James Graham, 1st Bt	Tory	John Christian Curwen	Whig
1820	Sir James Graham, 1st Bt	Tory	William James	Radical
1825	Sir Philip Musgrave, Bt	Tory	William James	Radical
1826	Sir Philip Musgrave, Bt	Tory	Sir James Graham, 2nd Bt	Whig
1827	James Lushington	Tory	Sir James Graham, 2nd Bt	Whig
1829	James Lushington	Tory	Sir William Scott, Bt	Tory
1830	James Lushington	Tory	Philip Howard	Whig
1831	William James	Radical	Philip Howard	Whig
1835	William Marshall	Whig	Philip Howard	Whig
1847	William Nicholson Hodgson	Conservative	John Dixon	Whig
1848 by-election	William Nicholson Hodgson	Conservative	Philip Howard	Whig
1852	Joseph Ferguson	Whig	Sir James Graham, Bt	Peelite
1857	William Nicholson Hodgson	Conservative	Sir James Graham, Bt	Peelite
1859	Wilfrid Lawson	Liberal	Sir James Graham, Bt	Liberal
1861 by-election	Wilfrid Lawson	Liberal	Edmund Potter	Liberal
1865	William Nicholson Hodgson	Conservative	Edmund Potter	Liberal
1868	Sir Wilfrid Lawson, Bt	Liberal	Edmund Potter	Liberal
1874	Sir Wilfrid Lawson, Bt	Liberal	Robert Ferguson	Liberal
1885	Representation reduced to one member			

=== MPs since 1885 ===
Election	Member	Party
1885	Robert Ferguson	Liberal
1886	Robert Ferguson	Liberal Unionist
1886	William Gully	Gladstonian Liberal
1895	William Gully	Speaker
1905 by-election	Frederick Chance	Liberal
1910 January	Richard Denman	Liberal
1918	Theodore Carr	Coalition Liberal
Jan 1922	Theodore Carr	National Liberal
1922	George Middleton	Labour
1924	William Watson	Conservative
1929	George Middleton	Labour
1931	Louis Spears	Conservative
1945	Edgar Grierson	Labour
1950	Alfred Hargreaves (aka Alex)	Labour
1955	Dr Donald Johnson	Conservative
1964	Ronald Lewis	Labour
1987	Eric Martlew	Labour
2010	John Stevenson	Conservative
2024	Julie Minns	Labour

== Election results ==
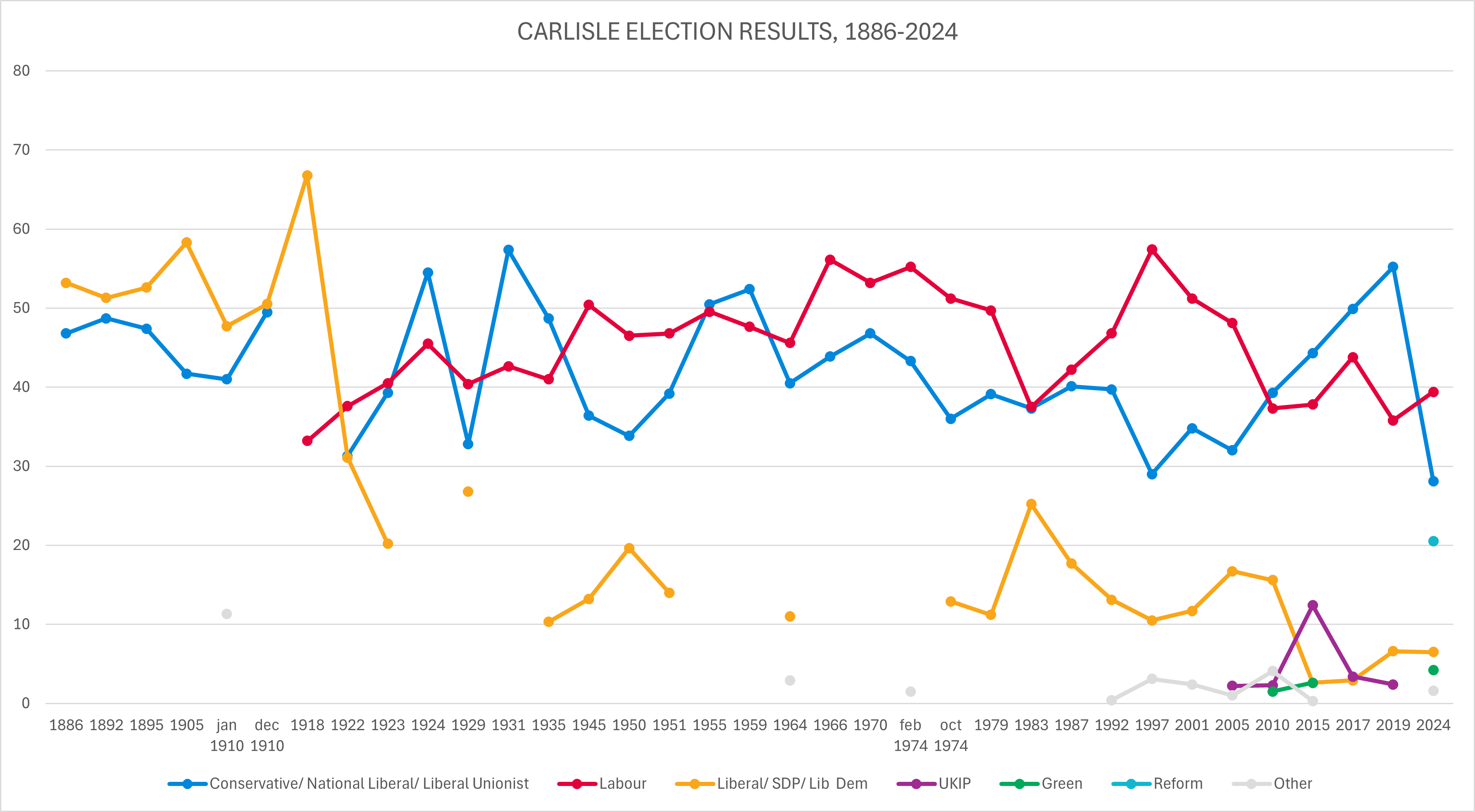
Election results 1886-2024

=== Elections in the 2020s ===
General election 2024: Carlisle
Party	Candidate	Votes	%	±%
Labour	Julie Minns	18,129	39.4	+4.9
Conservative	John Stevenson	12,929	28.1	–28.4
Reform	Stephen Ward	9,295	20.2	N/A
Liberal Democrats	Brian Wernham	2,982	6.5	+1.5
Green	Gavin Hawkton	1,922	4.2	+2.6
Independent	Sean Reed	303	0.7	N/A
SDP	Rachel Hayton	244	0.5	N/A
Independent	Thomas Lynestrider	175	0.4	N/A
Majority		5,200	11.3	N/A
Turnout		45,979	59.1	–8.5
Registered electors		77,863		
Labour gain from Conservative		Swing	+16.7	

2019 notional result
Party	Vote	%
Conservative	28,959	56.5
Labour	17,669	34.5
Liberal Democrats	2,560	5.0
UKIP	947	1.8
Green	823	1.6
Others	282	0.6
Turnout	51,240	67.5
Electorate	75,868	

=== Elections in the 2010s ===
General election 2019: Carlisle
Party	Candidate	Votes	%	±%
Conservative	John Stevenson	23,659	55.2	+5.3
Labour	Ruth Alcroft	15,340	35.8	―8.0
Liberal Democrats	Julia Aglionby	2,829	6.6	+3.7
UKIP	Fiona Mills	1,045	2.4	―1.0
Majority		8,319	19.4	+13.3
Turnout		42,873	65.9	―3.2
Registered electors		65,105		
Conservative hold		Swing	+6.7	

This was the largest UKIP vote share at the 2019 general election.

General election 2017: Carlisle
Party	Candidate	Votes	%	±%
Conservative	John Stevenson	21,472	49.9	+5.6
Labour	Ruth Alcroft	18,873	43.8	+6.0
UKIP	Fiona Mills	1,455	3.4	―9.0
Liberal Democrats	Peter Thornton	1,256	2.9	+0.3
Majority		2,599	6.1	―0.4
Turnout		43,046	69.1	+4.4
Conservative hold		Swing	―0.2	

General election 2015: Carlisle
Party	Candidate	Votes	%	±%
Conservative	John Stevenson	18,873	44.3	+5.0
Labour	Lee Sherriff	16,099	37.8	+0.5
UKIP	Fiona Mills	5,277	12.4	+10.1
Green	Helen Davison	1,125	2.6	+1.1
Liberal Democrats	Loraine Birchall	1,087	2.6	―13.0
Independent	Alfred Okam	126	0.3	New
Majority		2,774	6.5	+4.5
Turnout		42,587	64.7	0.0
Conservative hold		Swing	+2.3	

General election 2010: Carlisle
Party	Candidate	Votes	%	±%
Conservative	John Stevenson	16,589	39.3	+4.4
Labour	Michael Boaden	15,736	37.3	―9.3
Liberal Democrats	Neil Hughes	6,567	15.6	+0.1
BNP	Paul Stafford	1,086	2.6	New
UKIP	Michael Owen	969	2.3	±0.0
Green	John Reardon	614	1.5	New
TUSC	John Metcalfe	376	0.9	New
Independent	Peter Howe	263	0.6	New
Majority		853	2.0	N/A
Turnout		42,200	64.7	+4.7
Registered electors		65,263		
Conservative gain from Labour		Swing	+6.8	

2005 notional result
Party	Vote	%
Labour	17,803	46.6
Conservative	13,350	34.9
Liberal Democrats	5,915	15.5
Others	1,133	3.0
Turnout	38,201	59.9
Electorate	63,761	

=== Elections in the 2000s ===
General election 2005: Carlisle
Party	Candidate	Votes	%	±%
Labour	Eric Martlew	17,019	48.1	―3.1
Conservative	Mike Mitchelson	11,324	32.0	―2.8
Liberal Democrats	Steven Tweedie	5,916	16.7	+5.0
UKIP	Steven Cochrane	792	2.2	New
Legalise Cannabis	Lezley Gibson	343	1.0	―0.6
Majority		5,695	16.1	―0.3
Turnout		35,394	59.5	+0.1
Labour hold		Swing	―0.2	

General election 2001: Carlisle
Party	Candidate	Votes	%	±%
Labour	Eric Martlew	17,856	51.2	―6.2
Conservative	Mike Mitchelson	12,154	34.8	+5.8
Liberal Democrats	John Guest	4,076	11.7	+1.2
Legalise Cannabis	Colin Paisley	554	1.6	New
Socialist Alliance	Paul Wilcox	269	0.8	New
Majority		5,702	16.4	―12.0
Turnout		34,909	59.4	―13.4
Labour hold		Swing	―6.0	

=== Elections in the 1990s ===
General election 1997: Carlisle
Party	Candidate	Votes	%	±%
Labour	Eric Martlew	25,031	57.4	+12.1
Conservative	Richard Lawrence	12,641	29.0	―12.3
Liberal Democrats	Christopher Mayho	4,576	10.5	―2.5
Referendum	Angus Fraser	1,233	2.8	New
Natural Law	William Stevens	126	0.3	―0.2
Majority		12,390	28.4	+24.4
Turnout		43,607	72.8	―5.7
Registered electors		59,917		
Labour hold		Swing	+12.2	

1992 notional result
Party	Vote	%
Labour	21,667	45.3
Conservative	19,746	41.2
Liberal Democrats	6,232	13.0
Others	230	0.5
Turnout	47,875	78.5
Electorate	61,008	

General election 1992: Carlisle
Party	Candidate	Votes	%	±%
Labour	Eric Martlew	20,479	46.8	+4.6
Conservative	Clive Condie	17,371	39.7	―0.4
Liberal Democrats	Ralph Aldersey	5,740	13.1	―4.6
Natural Law	Nina Robinson	190	0.4	New
Majority		3,108	7.1	+5.0
Turnout		43,780	79.4	+0.6
Registered electors		55,140		
Labour hold		Swing	+2.5	

=== Elections in the 1980s ===
General election 1987: Carlisle
Party	Candidate	Votes	%	±%
Labour	Eric Martlew	18,311	42.2	+4.7
Conservative	William Hodgson	17,395	40.1	+2.8
SDP	Richard Hunt	7,655	17.7	―7.5
Majority		916	2.1	+1.9
Turnout		43,359	78.8	+2.4
Labour hold		Swing		

General election 1983: Carlisle
Party	Candidate	Votes	%	±%
Labour	Ronald Lewis	15,618	37.5	―12.2
Conservative	Richard Sowler	15,547	37.3	―1.8
SDP	Richard Hunt	10,471	25.2	+14.0
Majority		71	0.2	―10.4
Turnout		41,638	76.4	―3.6
Labour hold		Swing		

=== Elections in the 1970s ===
General election 1979: Carlisle
Party	Candidate	Votes	%	±%
Labour	Ronald Lewis	21,343	49.7	―1.5
Conservative	D. Bloomer	16,777	39.1	+3.1
Liberal	T. Potts	4,829	11.2	―1.7
Majority		4,566	10.6	―4.6
Turnout		42,951	80.0	+1.2
Labour hold		Swing		

General election October 1974: Carlisle
Party	Candidate	Votes	%	±%
Labour	Ronald Lewis	21,079	51.2	―4.0
Conservative	D. Bloomer	14,825	36.0	―7.3
Liberal	F. Phillips	5,306	12.9	New
Majority		6,254	15.2	+3.3
Turnout		41,211	78.8	―10.0
Labour hold		Swing		

General election February 1974: Carlisle
Party	Candidate	Votes	%	±%
Labour	Ronald Lewis	23,119	55.2	+2.0
Conservative	E. M. White	18,139	43.3	―3.5
Ind. Socialist	J. Wild	628	1.5	New
Majority		4,980	11.9	+5.5
Turnout		41,887	88.8	+10.2
Labour hold		Swing		

General election 1970: Carlisle
Party	Candidate	Votes	%	±%
Labour	Ronald Lewis	21,866	53.2	―2.9
Conservative	B. A. Marsden	19,241	46.8	+2.9
Majority		2,625	6.4	―5.9
Turnout		41,105	78.6	―4.9
Labour hold		Swing		

=== Elections in the 1960s ===
General election 1966: Carlisle
Party	Candidate	Votes	%	±%
Labour	Ronald Lewis	22,565	56.13	
Conservative	Godfrey William Iredell	17,638	43.87	
Majority		4,927	12.26	
Turnout		40,203	83.51	
Labour hold		Swing		

General election 1964: Carlisle
Party	Candidate	Votes	%	±%
Labour	Ronald Lewis	19,169	45.6	−2.0
Conservative	Peter T. S. Boydell	17,049	40.5	−11.9
Liberal	Brian G. Ashmore	4,617	11.0	New
Ind. Conservative	Donald Johnson	1,227	2.9	New
Majority		2,120	5.1	N/A
Turnout		42,062	85.6	+1.0
Labour gain from Conservative		Swing	+4.9	

=== Elections in the 1950s ===
General election 1959: Carlisle
Party	Candidate	Votes	%	±%
Conservative	Donald Johnson	21,948	52.38	
Labour	Alex Hargreaves	19,950	47.62	
Majority		1,998	4.76	
Turnout		41,898	84.61	
Conservative hold		Swing		

General election 1955: Carlisle
Party	Candidate	Votes	%	±%
Conservative	Donald Johnson	20,071	50.47	
Labour	Alex Hargreaves	19,701	49.53	
Majority		370	0.94	N/A
Turnout		39,772	82.30	
Conservative gain from Labour		Swing		

General election 1951: Carlisle
Party	Candidate	Votes	%	±%
Labour	Alex Hargreaves	19,648	46.8	+0.3
Conservative	Noel T. O'Reilly	16,456	39.2	+5.4
Liberal	Doreen Gorsky	5,886	14.0	−5.6
Majority		3,192	7.6	−5.1
Turnout		41,990	87.4	−1.1
Labour hold		Swing		

General election 1950: Carlisle
Party	Candidate	Votes	%	±%
Labour	Alex Hargreaves	19,031	46.50	
Conservative	H. E. R. Peers	13,850	33.84	
Liberal	Godfrey William Iredell	8,043	19.65	
Majority		5,181	12.66	
Turnout		40,924	88.49	
Labour hold		Swing		

=== Election in the 1940s ===
General election 1945: Carlisle
Party	Candidate	Votes	%	±%
Labour	Edgar Grierson	18,505	50.41	
Conservative	Edward Spears	13,356	36.39	
Liberal	Godfrey William Iredell	4,845	13.20	
Majority		5,149	14.02	N/A
Turnout		36,706	79.20	
Labour gain from Conservative		Swing		

=== Elections in the 1930s ===
General election 1939–40: Another general election was required to take place before the end of 1940. The political parties had been making preparations for an election to take place and by the Autumn of 1939, the following candidates had been selected;

- Conservative: Edward Spears
- Labour: Percy Barstow
- Liberal: Leslie H. Storey

General election 1935: Carlisle
Party	Candidate	Votes	%	±%
Conservative	Edward Spears	16,591	48.7	−8.6
Labour	Arnold Townend	13,956	41.0	+1.6
Liberal	Barbara Bliss	3,525	10.3	New
Majority		2,635	7.7	−7.0
Turnout		34,072	88.2	+1.5
Conservative hold		Swing	−3.5	

General election 1931: Carlisle
Party	Candidate	Votes	%	±%
Conservative	Edward Spears	18,079	57.35	
Labour	George Middleton	13,445	42.65	
Majority		4,634	14.70	N/A
Turnout		31,524	86.66	
Conservative gain from Labour		Swing		

=== Elections in the 1920s ===
General election 1929: Carlisle
Party	Candidate	Votes	%	±%
Labour	George Middleton	12,779	40.4	−5.1
Unionist	Edward Spears	10,362	32.8	−21.7
Liberal	Archibald Creighton	8,484	26.8	New
Majority		2,417	7.6	N/A
Turnout		31,625	90.4	+1.3
Labour gain from Unionist		Swing	+8.3	

General election 1924: Carlisle
Party	Candidate	Votes	%	±%
Unionist	William Watson	12,787	54.5	+15.2
Labour	George Middleton	10,676	45.5	+5.0
Majority		2,111	9.0	N/A
Turnout		23,463	89.1	+1.3
Unionist gain from Labour		Swing	+5.1	

Richard Denman

General election 1923: Carlisle
Party	Candidate	Votes	%	±%
Labour	George Middleton	9,120	40.5	+2.9
Unionist	William Watson	8,844	39.3	+8.0
Liberal	Richard Denman	4,541	20.2	−11.5
Majority		276	1.2	−5.1
Turnout		17,964	87.8	+3.8
Labour hold		Swing	−2.8	

General election 1922: Carlisle
Party	Candidate	Votes	%	±%
Labour	George Middleton	7,870	37.6	+4.4
Unionist	Claude Lowther	6,569	31.3	New
National Liberal	Theodore Carr	6,526	31.1	−35.7
Majority		1,301	6.3	N/A
Turnout		20,965	84.0	+22.2
Labour gain from National Liberal		Swing		

=== Elections in the 1910s ===
Theodore Carr

General election 1918: Carlisle
Party		Candidate	Votes	%	±%
C	National Liberal	Theodore Carr	9,511	66.8	+16.3
	Labour	Ernest Lowthian	4,736	33.2	New
Majority			4,775	33.6	+32.6
Turnout			14,247	61.8	−24.6
	National Liberal hold		Swing	N/A	
C indicates candidate endorsed by the coalition government.

A General Election was due to take place by the end of 1915. By the summer of 1914, the following candidates had been adopted to contest that election. Due to the outbreak of war, the election never took place.

- British Socialist Party: Ernest Lowthian

General election December 1910: Carlisle
Party	Candidate	Votes	%	±%
Liberal	Richard Denman	3,243	50.5	+2.8
Conservative	Irwen W. Raymond	3,179	49.5	+8.5
Majority		64	1.0	−5.7
Turnout		6,422	86.4	−5.9
Registered electors		7,436		
Liberal hold		Swing	−2.9	

General election January 1910: Carlisle
Party	Candidate	Votes	%	±%
Liberal	Richard Denman	3,270	47.7	N/A
Conservative	Valentine John Hussey-Walsh	2,815	41.0	New
Social Democratic Federation	Charlie Bannington	777	11.3	New
Majority		455	6.7	N/A
Turnout		6,862	92.3	N/A
Registered electors		7,436		
Liberal hold		Swing	N/A	

=== Elections in the 1900s ===
F.W. Chance

General election 1906: Carlisle
Party	Candidate	Votes	%	±%
Liberal	Frederick Chance	Unopposed		
Liberal hold				

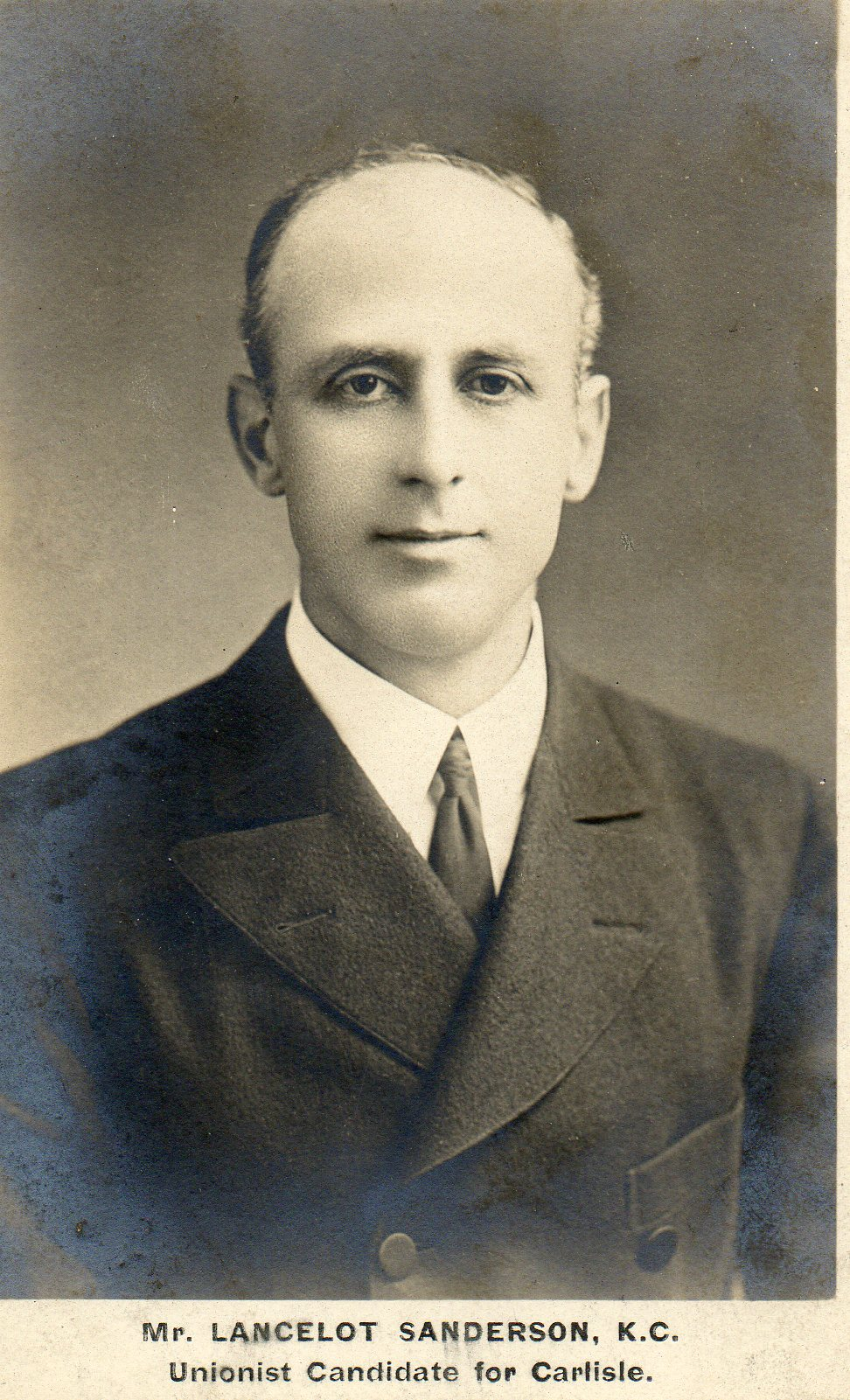

1905 Carlisle by-election
Party	Candidate	Votes	%	±%
Liberal	Frederick Chance	3,616	58.3	N/A
Conservative	Lancelot Sanderson	2,586	41.7	New
Majority		1,030	16.6	N/A
Turnout		6,202	84.4	N/A
Registered electors		7,344		
Liberal hold		Swing	N/A	

William Gully

General election 1900: Carlisle
Party	Candidate	Votes	%	±%
Speaker (Liberal)	William Gully	Unopposed		
Speaker hold				

=== Elections in the 1890s ===
General election 1895: Carlisle
Party	Candidate	Votes	%	±%
Speaker (Liberal)	William Gully	3,167	52.6	+1.3
Conservative	S. P. Foster	2,853	47.4	−1.3
Majority		314	5.2	+2.6
Turnout		6,020	88.6	+2.8
Registered electors		6,798		
Speaker hold		Swing	+1.3	

General election 1892: Carlisle
Party	Candidate	Votes	%	±%
Liberal	William Gully	2,729	51.3	−1.9
Conservative	S. P. Foster	2,586	48.7	+1.9
Majority		143	2.6	−3.8
Turnout		5,315	85.8	+5.4
Registered electors		6,195		
Liberal hold		Swing	−1.9	

=== Elections in the 1880s ===
General election 1886: Carlisle
Party	Candidate	Votes	%	±%
Liberal	William Gully	2,448	53.2	N/A
Conservative	William George Frederick Cavendish Bentinck	2,155	46.8	New
Majority		293	6.4	N/A
Turnout		4,603	80.4	N/A
Registered electors		5,726		
Liberal hold				

General election 1885: Carlisle
Party	Candidate	Votes	%	±%
Liberal	Robert Ferguson	Unopposed		
Liberal hold				

General election 1880: Carlisle (2 seats)
Party	Candidate	Votes	%	±%
Liberal	Robert Ferguson	2,802	37.6	+8.9
Liberal	Wilfrid Lawson	2,691	36.1	+8.7
Conservative	Miles Walker Mattinson	1,968	26.4	−17.5
Majority		723	9.7	+5.5
Turnout		4,770 (est)	85.9 (est)	+6.0
Registered electors		5,550		
Liberal hold		Swing	+8.8	
Liberal hold		Swing	+8.7	

=== Elections in the 1870s ===
General election 1874: Carlisle (2 seats)
Party	Candidate	Votes	%	±%
Liberal	Robert Ferguson	2,154	28.7	−3.9
Liberal	Wilfrid Lawson	2,051	27.4	−6.4
Conservative	William Farrer Ecroyd	1,741	23.2	+7.0
Conservative	William Banks	1,551	20.7	+4.5
Majority		310	4.2	+2.8
Turnout		3,749 (est)	79.9 (est)	−9.0
Registered electors		4,693		
Liberal hold		Swing	−5.5	
Liberal hold		Swing	−5.5	

=== Elections in the 1860s ===
General election 1868: Carlisle (2 seats)
Party	Candidate	Votes	%	±%
Liberal	Wilfrid Lawson	2,043	33.8	+1.4
Liberal	Edmund Potter	1,971	32.6	−0.8
Conservative	William Nicholson Hodgson	1,957	32.4	−1.7
Independent Liberal	William Slater	71	1.2	New
Majority		86	1.4	N/A
Turnout		4,035 (est)	88.9 (est)	−4.0
Registered electors		4,537		
Liberal hold		Swing	+1.1	
Liberal gain from Conservative		Swing	+0.0	

General election 1865: Carlisle (2 seats)
Party	Candidate	Votes	%	±%
Conservative	William Nicholson Hodgson	616	34.1	+3.0
Liberal	Edmund Potter	604	33.4	−1.8
Liberal	Wilfrid Lawson	586	32.4	−1.3
Majority		30	1.7	N/A
Turnout		1,211 (est)	92.9 (est)	+12.9
Registered electors		1,304		
Conservative gain from Liberal		Swing	+3.1	
Liberal hold		Swing	−1.7	

By-election, 26 November 1861: Carlisle (1 seat)
Party	Candidate	Votes	%	±%
Liberal	Edmund Potter	536	50.1	−18.8
Conservative	William Nicholson Hodgson	533	49.9	+18.8
Majority		3	0.2	−2.4
Turnout		1,069	89.5	+9.5
Registered electors		1,195		
Liberal hold		Swing	−18.8	

- Caused by Graham's death.

=== Elections in the 1850s ===
General election 1859: Carlisle (2 seats)
Party	Candidate	Votes	%	±%
Liberal	James Graham	538	35.2	+1.7
Liberal	Wilfrid Lawson	516	33.7	+2.4
Conservative	William Nicholson Hodgson	475	31.1	−4.2
Majority		41	2.6	+0.4
Turnout		1,002 (est)	80.0 (est)	−3.0
Registered electors		1,253		
Liberal hold		Swing	+1.9	
Liberal gain from Conservative		Swing	+2.3	

General election 1857: Carlisle (2 seats)
Party	Candidate	Votes	%	±%
Conservative	William Nicholson Hodgson	529	35.3	+6.5
Peelite	James Graham	502	33.5	−2.6
Whig	Joseph Ferguson	469	31.3	−3.9
Turnout		1,015 (est)	83.0 (est)	+0.3
Registered electors		1,223		
Majority		60	4.0	N/A
Conservative gain from Whig		Swing	+5.2	
Majority		33	2.2	−5.1
Peelite hold		Swing	−2.9	

By-election, 1 January 1853: Carlisle (2 seats)
Party	Candidate	Votes	%	±%
Peelite	James Graham	Unopposed		
Peelite hold				

- Caused by Graham's appointment as First Lord of the Admiralty

General election 1852: Carlisle (2 seats)
Party	Candidate	Votes	%	±%
Peelite	James Graham	525	36.1	N/A
Whig	Joseph Ferguson	512	35.2	−31.0
Conservative	William Nicholson Hodgson	419	28.8	−5.1
Turnout		938 (est)	82.7 (est)	−1.6
Registered electors		1,134		
Majority		106	7.3	N/A
Peelite gain from Conservative		Swing	N/A	
Majority		93	6.4	+5.8
Whig hold		Swing	−13.0	

=== Elections in the 1840s ===
By-election, 14 March 1848: Carlisle (2 seats)
Party	Candidate	Votes	%	±%
Conservative	William Nicholson Hodgson	477	37.4	+3.5
Whig	Philip Howard	414	32.5	+0.8
Whig	John Dixon	328	25.7	−8.8
Chartist	Peter Murray McDouall	55	4.3	New
Turnout		637 (est)	59.7 (est)	−24.6
Registered electors		1,067		
Majority		63	4.9	+2.7
Conservative hold		Swing	+3.8	
Majority		359	28.2	+27.6
Whig hold		Swing	−0.5	

- Caused by the previous election being declared void on petition due to the "several acts of treating".

General election 1847: Carlisle (2 seats)
Party	Candidate	Votes	%	±%
Whig	John Dixon	479	34.5	+2.0
Conservative	William Nicholson Hodgson	471	33.9	+6.0
Whig	Philip Howard	440	31.7	−7.8
Turnout		899	84.3	−1.3
Registered electors		1,054		
Majority		8	0.6	−4.0
Whig hold		Swing	−0.5	
Majority		31	2.2	N/A
Conservative gain from Whig		Swing	+5.9	

General election 1841: Carlisle (2 seats)
Party	Candidate	Votes	%	±%
Whig	Philip Howard	419	39.5	N/A
Whig	William Marshall	345	32.5	N/A
Conservative	Edward Goulburn	296	27.9	New
Majority		49	4.6	N/A
Turnout		643	85.6	N/A
Registered electors		751		
Whig hold		Swing	N/A	
Whig hold		Swing	N/A	

=== Elections in the 1830s ===
General election 1837: Carlisle (2 seats)
Party	Candidate	Votes	%	±%
Whig	Philip Howard	Unopposed		
Whig	William Marshall	Unopposed		
Registered electors		1,012		
Whig hold				
Whig hold				

General election 1835: Carlisle (2 seats)
Party	Candidate	Votes	%	±%
Whig	Philip Howard	Unopposed		
Whig	William Marshall	Unopposed		
Registered electors		946		
Whig hold				
Whig gain from Radical				

General election 1832: Carlisle (2 seats)
Party	Candidate	Votes	%	±%
Radical	William James	477	44.5	+1.9
Whig	Philip Howard	472	44.0	+1.4
Tory	John Malcolm	124	11.6	−3.3
Turnout		646	66.1	c. +51.1
Registered electors		977		
Majority		5	0.5	+0.5
Radical hold		Swing	+1.8	
Majority		348	32.4	+4.7
Whig hold		Swing	+1.5	

General election 1831: Carlisle (2 seats)
Party	Candidate	Votes	%	±%
Radical	William James	100	42.6	N/A
Whig	Philip Howard	100	42.6	N/A
Tory	James Lushington	35	14.9	N/A
Turnout		c. 135	c. 15%	N/A
Registered electors		c. 900		
Majority		0	0.0	N/A
Radical gain from Tory		Swing	N/A	
Majority		65	27.7	N/A
Whig hold		Swing	N/A	

General election 1830: Carlisle (2 seats)
Party	Candidate	Votes	%	±%
Tory	James Lushington	Unopposed		
Whig	Philip Howard	Unopposed		
Tory hold				
Whig hold				

=== Elections in the 18th century ===
Election results taken from the History of Parliament Trust series.

General election 1747: Carlisle (2 seats)
Party	Candidate	Votes	%	±%
Non Partisan	Charles Howard	Unopposed	N/A	N/A
Whig	John Stanwix	Unopposed	N/A	N/A

- Death of Hylton

By-election 26 November 1746: Carlisle
Party	Candidate	Votes	%	±%
Whig	John Stanwix	N/A	N/A	N/A
Non Partisan	Richard Musgrave	N/A	N/A	N/A

General election 13 May 1741: Carlisle (2 seats)
Party	Candidate	Votes	%	±%
Non Partisan	Charles Howard	109	38.11	N/A
Whig	John Stanwix	90	31.47	N/A
Tory	John Hylton	87	30.42	N/A

- Note: Stanwix was unseated on petition and replaced by Hylton, 26 January 1742

General election 3 May 1734: Carlisle (2 seats)
Party	Candidate	Votes	%	±%
Non Partisan	Charles Howard	354	37.82	N/A
Tory	John Hylton	351	37.50	N/A
Non Partisan	Henry Aglionby	231	24.68	N/A

General election 1727: Carlisle (2 seats)
Party	Candidate	Votes	%	±%
Non Partisan	Charles Howard	Unopposed	N/A	N/A
Tory	John Hylton	Unopposed	N/A	N/A

General election 27 March 1722: Carlisle (2 seats)
Party	Candidate	Votes	%	±%
Non Partisan	Henry Aglionby	398	37.65	N/A
Tory	James Bateman	350	33.11	N/A
Whig	Thomas Stanwix	309	29.23	N/A

By-election 12 April 1721: Carlisle
Party	Candidate	Votes	%	±%
Non Partisan	Henry Aglionby	268	67.00	N/A
Whig	Thomas Stanwix	132	33.00	N/A

General election 1715: Carlisle (2 seats)
Party	Candidate	Votes	%	±%
Whig	William Strickland	Unopposed	N/A	N/A
Whig	Thomas Stanwix	Unopposed	N/A	N/A

- Stanwix appointed Governor of Kingston-upon-Hull

== See also ==
- List of parliamentary constituencies in Cumbria

== Notes ==
Parliament of the United Kingdom
Preceded by Warwick and Leamington	Constituency represented by the speaker 1895–1905	Succeeded by Penrith
