= Alex Hargreaves =

British politician (1899–1978)

Alfred Hargreaves (15 February 1899 – February 1978), known as Alex Hargreaves, was a British Labour Party Member of Parliament.

Born in Liverpool, Hargreaves worked as a railway clerk and was a member of the Railway Clerks' Association. He joined the Labour Party and was elected to Liverpool City Council in 1928, serving until 1950. In 1945, he was the President of Liverpool Trades Council and Labour Party. In 1949, he was appointed to the Mersey Docks and Harbour Board as a nominee of the Ministry of Transport.

At the 1950 general election, Hargreaves was elected in Carlisle. He held the seat in 1951, but was defeated in 1955 and failed to regain the seat in 1959.

Parliament of the United Kingdom
Preceded by Edgar Grierson	Member of Parliament for Carlisle; 1950–1955	Succeeded by Donald McIntosh Johnson
