= Theodore Carr =

British politician (1866–1931)

Theodore Carr

(William) Theodore Carr CBE (30 July 1866 – 31 January 1931) was an English industrialist and Liberal politician.

== Personal life and career ==
Carr was born in Carlisle in Cumberland. He was educated at Old Hall School and Owens College, Manchester. In 1893, he married Edith Hobbs. Carr came from the family which founded the Carr's bakery and biscuit factory in Carlisle. He went into the family concern and eventually became Chairman of Directors of Carr & Co., Ltd, biscuit manufacturers, and of Carr's Flour Mills (Ltd), Carlisle. During the war Carr acted as the millers' representative on the Millers' Tribunal set up under the Ministry of Food. A keen motorist he was appointed to the command of the Cumberland Army Service Motor Mechanical Transport Volunteers.

== Political and public life ==
At the 1918 general election, Carr was nominated as the Coalition Liberal candidate for his home town seat of Carlisle. On that occasion he had the support of the Carlisle Unionists who stood aside as they were part of the Coalition government and was presumably awarded the Coalition coupon. In a straight fight against Labour he took 66% of the poll winning by a majority of 4,775 votes.

With the fall of the Coalition in 1922, the Unionists voted to stand a candidate of their own in Carlisle, even though Carr had the support of some prominent Conservatives. The Carlisle Liberal Association had remained unified during the period of the Coalition, despite the national split between the supporters of David Lloyd George and H H Asquith and again threw their support behind Carr, although he chose to stand as a National Liberal, indicating his status as a supporter of outgoing prime minister David Lloyd George. However, in a three-cornered contest against Labour and Conservative opponents he fell to third in the poll as Labour took the seat with a majority of 1,301. Carr did not stand for Parliament again.

Carr was awarded the CBE in 1920. He was also Chairman of the East Cumberland Munitions Committee and sometime President of the Cumberland and Westmoreland Association of London.

Parliament of the United Kingdom
Preceded by Richard Denman	Member of Parliament for Carlisle; 1918 – 1922	Succeeded by George Middleton
