= Richard Assheton =

16th-century English politician

Member of Parliament for Carlisle
- In office 1558–1558

Member of Parliament for Aldborough
- In office 1559–1559

Member of Parliament for Carlisle
- In office 1563–1567

Personal details
- Born: by 1529
- Died: 1579
- Occupation: Politician

Richard Assheton (by 1529 – 1579), of Whalley and Downham, Lancashire, was an English politician.

He was a Member (MP) of the Parliament of England for Aldborough in 1559 and for Carlisle in 1558 and 1563.
