= Thomas Sandford (MP) =

English politician

Thomas Sandford (fl. 1597) was an English politician.

He was a member (MP) of the Parliament of England for Carlisle in 1597.
