= George Middleton (British politician) =

British politician (1876–1938)

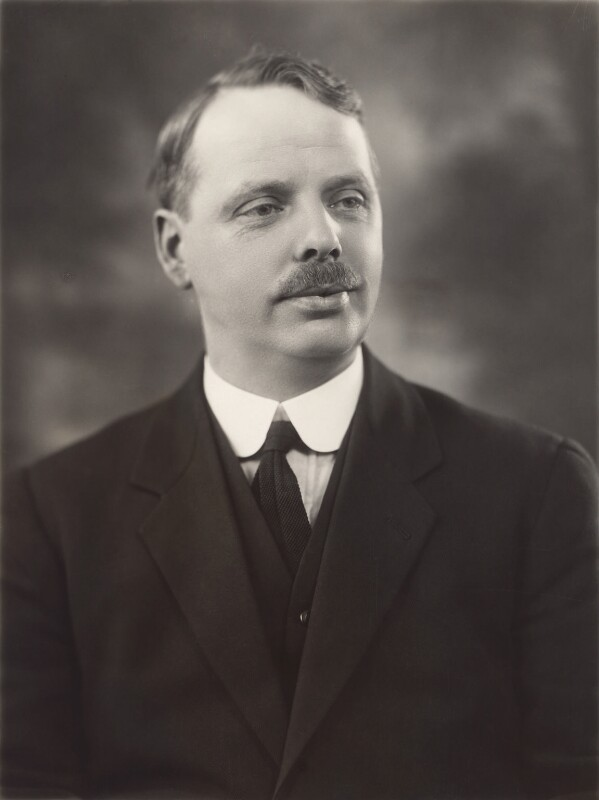
Middleton in 1924

Sir George Middleton (1876 – 25 October 1938) was a Labour Party politician in the United Kingdom who served as Member of Parliament (MP) for Carlisle in the 1920s and 1930s. He was later a Church Estates Commissioner.

Born in Ramsey, Huntingdonshire, he started work at the Post Office, and became prominent in the Union of Post Office Workers, editing its magazine.

He unsuccessfully contested the Altrincham constituency at the 1918 general election. He switched to Carlisle for the 1922 election, winning the seat from the sitting National Liberal MP. He was re-elected in 1923, but lost his seat at the 1924 general election. He regained the seat at the 1929 election, but was defeated again in 1931 and did not stand again.

In 1931 he replaced Sir Lewis Dibdin as First Church Estate Commissioner. He was knighted in 1935.

Parliament of the United Kingdom
Preceded by Theodore Carr	Member of Parliament for Carlisle; 1922 – 1924	Succeeded by William Watson
Preceded by William Watson	Member of Parliament for Carlisle; 1929 – 1931	Succeeded by Edward Spears
Church of England titles
Preceded by John Birchall	Second Church Estates Commissioner; 1924	Succeeded by John Birchall
Preceded by John Birchall	Second Church Estates Commissioner; 1929–1931	Succeeded by Richard Denman
Preceded by Sir Lewis Dibdin	First Church Estates Commissioner; 1931–1938	Succeeded by Sir Philip Baker Wilbraham
