= William Middleton (by 1533 – 1574 or later) =

English politician

William Middleton (by 1533 – 1574 or later) was an English politician.

He was a member (MP) of the parliament of England for Carlisle in 1555.
