= John Aglionby (MP) =

16th-century English politician

- Died: 1575
- Occupation: politician

John Aglionby (by 1532 – 1575 or later), of Carlisle, Cumbria, was an English politician.

== Biography ==
Aglionby was probably the son of Edward Aglionby (by 1495 – c. 1553) of Carlisle.

He served as Justice of the Peace of Cumbria in 1554–1669. And he also held the office of coroner in 1556 and 1575.

Aglionby was a Member of Parliament for Carlisle in October 1553 (Mary I's 1st parliament), where he supported the Protestant reforms. He may have represented Carlisle in 1559 (Elizabeth I's 1st Parliament), but did not participate in the debates.

== Family ==
Aglionby married the daughter of Richard Salkeld of Corby Castle. They had at least one son, Edward Aglionby (died 1599) who represented Carlisle in the parliaments of 1584 and 1593.
