= John Oswen =

English printer

- Occupation: Printer

John Oswen (fl. 1548–1553) was an English printer.

== Biography ==
Oswen first settled at Ipswich, and afterwards at Worcester. Three printers are known to have worked at Ipswich in 1548: Anthony Scoloker, who began in 1547, and whose latest book is dated 14 Feb. 1548; John Overton, whose only known book bears the date 31 July 1548; and Oswen, in whose earliest book it is stated that it was finished on 10 August 1548. The title is: 'The Mynde of the Godly and excellent lerned man M. Ihon Caluyne, what a Faithfull man, whiche is instructe in theWorde of God, ought to do, dwellinge amongst the Papistes.' Copies of this work, which is in octavo, are in the British Museum, Bodleian, and other libraries. It was followed in September 1548 by Calvin's 'Brief declaration of the fained sacrament, commonly called the extreame unction,' and in the same year by Hegendorft's 'Domestycal or housholde Sermons,' Melanchthon's 'Trewe auctoritie of the Churche,' Œcolampadius's 'Epistle that there ought to be no respect of personages of the poore,' 'An exhortatio to the sycke,' Marcort's 'Declaration of the Masse,' 'An Inuectiue against Drunkennes,' and a poem by Peter Moone, entitled: "A short treatyse of certayn thioges abused In the Popysh Church, long vsed: But now abolyshed, to our consolation And Gods word auaunced, the lyght of our saluation."

Oswen left Ipswich probably about Christmas 1548, and no other well-authenticated record of printing in that town occurs during the sixteenth century.

After his settlement at Worcester, one of the earliest books which were issued from his press was 'A Consultorie for all Christians . . . Written by H. H.,' dated 30 Jan. 1549, of which the only known copy is in the library of Mr. Alfred H. Huth. Prefixed to this work is the king's license of 6 Jan. 1548–9 to Oswen to print all sorts of service or prayer books, and 'al maner of bokes conteinyng any storye or exposition of Gods holy scripture . . . within our Principalitie of Wales, and marches of the same.' He accordingly printed, on 24 May 1549, the Book of Common Prayer in quarto, and on 30 July 1549 an edition of the same in folio, and these were followed on 1 Sept. by 'The Psalter or Psalmes of Dauid after the translation of the great Bible,' and on 8 Oct. by 'Certayne Sermons,' or homilies, both in quarto. All these are in the British Museum. In 1549 also, on 5 Aug., he printed 'A message from King Edward the 6th at Richmond, concerning obedience to Religion.' Next year, on 12 Jan. 1550, Oswen issued his edition of the New Testament, Cranmer's version, a copy of which is in the British Museum, and in this year printed also Matteo Gribaldi's 'Notable epistle concerning the terrible iudgement of God vpon hym that for feare of men denyeth Christ and the knowen veritie,' Zwingli's 'Short pathwaye to the ryghte and true vnderstanaing of the holye Scriptures,' and Veron's ' Godly saiyngs of the old auncient faithful fathers vpon the Sacrament of the bodye and bloude of Chryste. In 1551 he printed Bullinger's 'Dialogue betwene the seditious Libertin or rebel Anabaptist and the true obedient Christian,' and Bishop Hooper's 'Annotations in ye xiii. chapyter too the Romaynes,' No book of the year 1552 is on record, but in 1553 Oswen closed his career with the Issue of Bishop Hooper's 'Homelye to be read in the tyme of pestylence,' and the Statutes of 7 Edward VI. Both Maunsell and Herbert mention other books as having been printed by Oswen at Worcester, but some cannot now be traced. All are exceedingly rare, and to several is added the notification, 'They be also to sell at Shrewsbury.'

The Worcester press appears to have ceased with the end of the reign of Edward VI, and not to have been revived until the middle of the seventeenth century.
