= Association of Former Members of Parliament =

British parliamentary organisation

The Association of Former Members of Parliament is a British organisation for former members of the House of Commons of the United Kingdom and of the House of Lords, founded in 2001 or 2003.

In 2001, the House of Commons agreed to a motion to establish a working group on provision of advice and assistance for former Members. In 2006, the House of Commons agreed to a motion acknowledging the work done by the Association and its Executive Committee and welcoming the financial and other assistance accorded to the Association by the House of Commons Commission.

It produces a magazine called Order! Order! and has an office in the House of Commons. It has members of all political parties including both John Major and Tony Blair.

In 2007 it commissioned research on "the challenges former parliamentarians can face in navigating the world of work".
