= John Dudley (writer) =

English writer

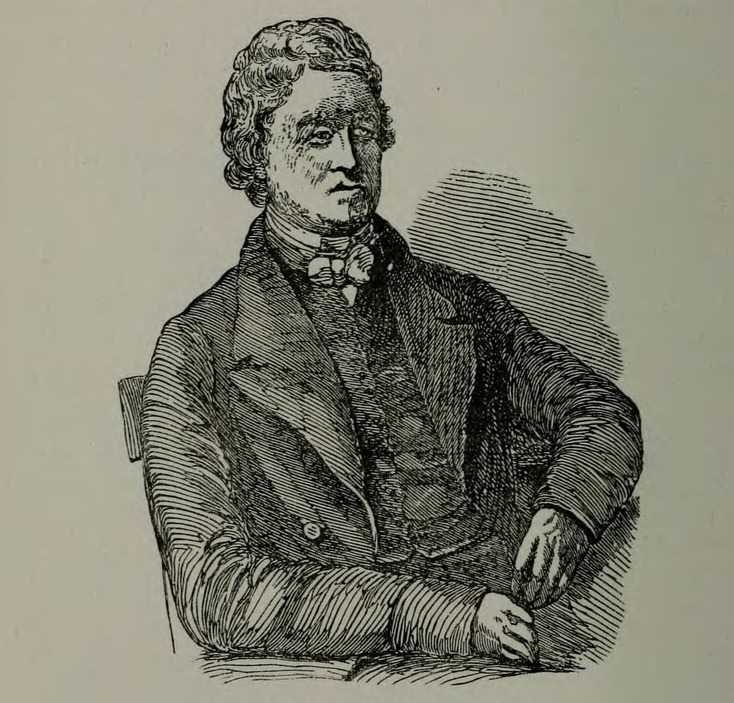
- Born: 1762
- Died: 7 January 1856
- Occupation: Writer

John Dudley (1762–1856) was an English writer.

Dudley was the eldest son of the Rev. John Dudley, vicar of Humberstone, Leicestershire. He was born at Humberstone, and educated at Uppingham School, whence he went to Clare Hall, Cambridge. He proceeded B.A. 1785 (when he was second wrangler and mathematical prizeman), and M.A. 1788. In 1787 he was elected fellow, and in 1788 tutor. In 1794 he succeeded his father in the living of Humberstone. His grandfather had previously held the benefice, which continued in the family for three generations during 142 years. In 1795 he was also presented to the vicarage of Sileby, Leicestershire. According to his own account (advertisement to Naology), Dudley spent ‘a long and happy life’ as ‘a retired student,’ occupying himself chiefly with mythological and philosophical studies.

He died at Sileby, 7 January 1856.

== Works ==
Dudley wrote:

- Sermon preached before the University of Cambridge on the Translation of the Scriptures into the Languages of Indian Asia, Cambridge, 1807
- The Metamorphosis of Sona, a Hindú Tale, in verse, 1810
- A Dissertation showing the Identity of the Rivers Niger and Nile, 1821
- Naology, or a Treatise on the Origin, Progress, and Symbolical Import of the Sacred Structures of the most Eminent Nations and Ages of the World, 1846
- The Anti-Materialist, denying the Reality of Matter and vindicating the Universality of Spirit, 1849. This is a treatise written under the influence of the philosophy of Berkeley, to whose memory it is dedicated.
