= Botcherby =

Coordinates: 54.88°N 02.92°W

- Suburb
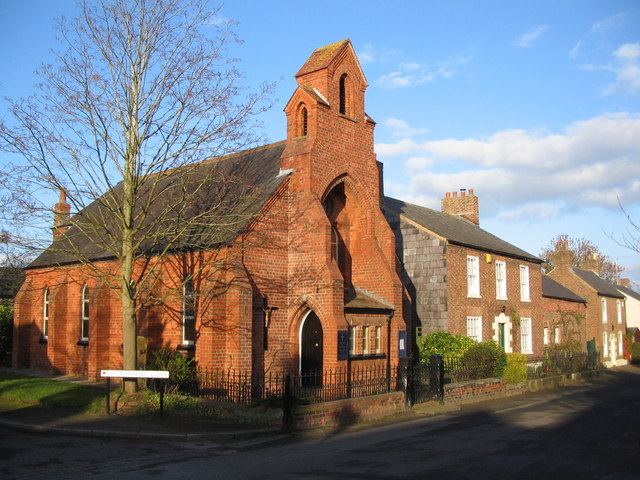
- St Andrew's Church, Botcherby

- Location in the former Carlisle district Location within Cumbria
- Population: 6,194 (2011.ward)
- OS grid reference: NY4155
- Unitary authority: Cumberland
- Ceremonial county: Cumbria
- Region: North West
- Country: England
- Sovereign state: United Kingdom
- Post town: CARLISLE
- Postcode district: CA1
- Dialling code: 01228
- Police: Cumbria
- Fire: Cumbria
- Ambulance: North West

Botcherby is a former village in Cumbria, England, now considered a suburb of the city of Carlisle. It is located east of the River Petteril south of its confluence with the River Eden, Cumbria.

== History ==
Botcherby was first named in 1170 and became part of Carlisle in 1912. The first reference to "Botcherby" (albeit with a different spelling) was when William Rufus (King William II, reigned 1087–1100) granted a large piece of land around Carlisle to a Flemish mercenary officer called "Bochard" who had served in his army. The grant was confirmed by William's successor, Henry I, in a Deed which obliged Bochard to build a castle (not for his own use) in the town, and also to "keep out the Scots and repopulate the district". At some point in the 16th century the name was anglicized to "Botcherby".

In 1812, Margery Jackson – a miser from Carlisle – spent her last years in the house of Joseph Bowman of Botcherby, with her box of gold. She left the money to Bowman.

== See also ==
- List of places in Cumbria
