= Edward Aglionby (died c. 1591) =

Member of the Parliament of England

Edward Aglionby (1520 – c. 1591) was an English Member of Parliament, official, translator and poet. He was closely associated with the Dudley family.

== Life ==
Aglionby was born at Carlisle in 1520, and educated at Eton, from whence he was elected in 1536 to a scholarship at King's College, Cambridge, of which society he appears to have become a fellow three years later. He graduated B.A. in 1540–1541, and M.A. in 1544.

He was returned MP for Carlisle in 1547 (Edward VI's 1st parliament)|, but he did not serve for the full duration. He was returned for Carlisle in May 1553 (Edward VI's 1st parliament) and may have sat as the MP for Carlisle in 1559.

Subsequently he was appointed a justice of the peace for Warwickshire, where he possessed considerable property. His residence was at Temple Balshall. In December 1569 the treasure for the supply of the army sent to suppress the Northern Rebellion was committed to his charge, and he conveyed it safely to Berwick-on-Tweed.

He was returned for Warwick to the parliament of April 1571, and spoke thrice on the bill for imposing penalties on those who did not attend the services of the Established Church. The measure, he urged, ought to be only temporary in its operation. On 12 August 1572 he was elected recorder of Warwick. Queen Elizabeth I visited that town the same day on her way from Bishop's Itchington to Kenilworth Castle, and the new recorder made an oration to her majesty, which is printed in Nichols's Progresses of Queen Elizabeth. In November 1587 he resigned the recordership "because of his great age, and impotency to travel, and failing of sight".

== Works ==
Aglionby was the translator of:

- A notable and maruailous epistle of the famous Doctor Mathewe Gribalde, professor of the law in the vniuersitie of Padua: concerning the terrible judgement of god vpon hym, that for feare of men denyeth Christ, and the knowen veritie: with a Preface of Doctor Caluine. Translated out of Latin intoo English by E. A.Worcester (printed by John Oswen), 1550.

It was republished at London, without date, by Henry Denham, for William Norton: Now newely imprinted, with a godly and wholesome preseruative against desperation, at all tymes necessarie for the soule: chiefly to be vsed when the deuill dooeth assaulte vs moste fiercely, and death approacheth nighest.

Aglionby wrote a genealogy of Queen Elizabeth, for which she gave him an annual pension of five pounds. A Latin poem of his was printed in Wilson's Epigrammata, 1552, 4to.

== Family ==
He married Catharine, daughter of Sir William Wigston, his predecessor in the office of recorder of Warwick.
