= Dalston railway station =

Dalston railway station may refer to:

- Dalston railway station (Cumbria), in the village of Dalston, Cumbria, England
- Dalston railway station (London), a proposed station on the Crossrail 2 line, in Dalston, London, England
- Dalston Junction railway station, an inter-modal transport interchange on the East London Line
- Dalston Kingsland railway station, a station on the North London Line of the London Overground

== See also ==
- Dalton railway station, in Dalton-in-Furness, Cumbria, England
