= Robert Carlisle (died 1433) =

English politician

Robert Carlisle (died 1433), of Carlisle, Cumberland, was an English politician.

He was a member (MP) of the parliament of England for Carlisle in 1410, May 1413, November 1414, 1417, 1419, May 1421 and 1422.
