= Edgar Grierson =

British politician

Edgar Grierson (6 November 1884 – 1 March 1959) was a British Labour Party politician from Carlisle. He sat in the House of Commons from 1945 to 1950.

Grierson was the son of William Grierson from Scotby, Carlisle. He was educated at Scotby Elementary School, and during World War I he served in France with the Border Regiment from 1914 to 1918.

He was a member of Carlisle City Council from 1929 to 1950, and became an alderman. He was Mayor of Carlisle from 1941 to 1942 and deputy mayor from 1942 to 1944.

He was elected at the 1945 general election as the Member of Parliament (MP) for Carlisle, and held the seat until the 1950 general election, when he did not stand again.

Parliament of the United Kingdom
Preceded by Edward Spears	Member of Parliament for Carlisle; 1945–1950	Succeeded by Alex Hargreaves
