= Henry Scrope (died 1625) =

English politician

Henry Scrope (ca. 1570–1625), of Greenwich, Kent, was an English politician.

He was the younger son of Henry Scrope, 9th Baron Scrope of Bolton and his second wife Margaret, daughter of Henry Howard, Earl of Surrey. He matriculated at Emmanuel College, Cambridge in 1585 and attained a MA in 1588 the year he was admitted to Gray's Inn.

He held land in Easby, Richmondshire and Ewcott Grange, Whitby. Through his family's influence he was a Member (MP) of the Parliament of England for Carlisle in 1589, 1593, 1597 and 1601. He was in Venice in 1593, from where he wrote to the Earl of Essex. In 1597 his brother feared that due to the 'course that he takes', he would not live long.

He never married and died at Greenwich in October 1625.
