= Robert Dalton (MP) =

16th-century English politician

Robert Dalton (by 1533 – 1567 or later), of Carlisle, Cumberland, was an English politician.

He was Mayor of Carlisle for 1554 and 1566–67 and elected a member (MP) of the parliament of England for Carlisle in 1558.
