= Robert Carlisle (died c. 1425) =

English politician

Robert Carlisle (died c. 1425) of Carlisle, Cumberland, was an English politician.

He was a member (MP) of the parliament of England for Carlisle in 1378, January 1380, 1381 and February 1388.
