= William Dalston =

English politician

Sir William Dalston, 1st Baronet (died 13 January 1683) was an English politician who sat in the House of Commons from 1640 to 1644. He supported the Royalist side in the English Civil War.

Dalston was the son of Sir George Dalston of Dalston Hall, near Carlisle, Cumberland and his wife Catharine Thornworth. He was educated at St John's College, Cambridge.

In April 1640, Dalston was elected Member of Parliament for Carlisle in the Short Parliament and was re-elected in November 1640 as MP for Carlisle in the Long Parliament. Dalston was created a baronet on 15 February 1641 and supported the King in the Civil War. He was disabled from Parliament in 1644.

Dalston married Anne Boles a considerable heiress and had several children. He was succeeded by his second son, John, his eldest son having died before him.

Parliament of England
Parliament suspended since 1629	Member of Parliament for Carlisle; 1640–1644; With: Richard Barwis	Succeeded by Richard Barwis; Thomas Cholmley
Baronetage of England
New creation	Baronet (of Dalston); 1641–1683	Succeeded by John Dalston
