= Thomas Pattenson =

English priest (late 16th and early 17th centuries)

Thomas Pattenson was an English priest in the late 16th and early 17th centuries.

Pattenson was educated at Trinity College, Cambridge. In 1568 he became a Fellow at Christ's College, Cambridge. He was incorporated at Oxford University in 1577. Pattenson was the archdeacon of Chichester from 1603 until his death in 1607.
