= John H. Dudley =

United States Army general

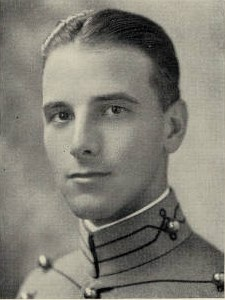
- As a West Point cadet in 1930
- Born: 25 September 1907; Oakland, California, US
- Died: 2 October 1994 (aged 87); Fairfax, Virginia, US
- Burial place: West Point Cemetery, West Point, New York
- Military career
- Allegiance: United States
- Branch: United States Army
- Service years: 1930–1960
- Rank: Brigadier General
- Nickname: Jack
- Commands: 931st Engineer Aviation Regiment; 18th Engineer Brigade
- Conflicts: World War II: Bismarck Archipelago campaign; New Guinea campaign; Leyte campaign; Luzon Campaign; Occupation of Japan
- Awards: Legion of Merit (2); Army Commendation Medal (2); Philippine Liberation Medal (Philippines)

John Henderson Dudley (25 September 1907 – 2 October 1994) was a brigadier general in the United States Army (USA). A graduate of the United States Military Academy at West Point class of 1930, he participated in the Manhattan Project and the campaigns in the Southwest Pacific Area during World War II.

== Early life and career ==
John Henderson (Jack) Dudley was born in Oakland, California, on 25 September 1907, the son of Captain Clark DeWitt Dudley, an Army officer who had earned battlefield commission in the Philippine–American War, and his wife Margaret née Henderson, the daughter of an engineer who oversaw corporate mining operations in the California Mother Lode. Dudley had an older sister, Jane. He entered the United States Military Academy at West Point, New York, on 1 July 1926. He played football (although he did not earn a varsity letter in that sport), and competed in track athletics and modern pentathlon. He graduated 28th in the class of 1930, and was commissioned as a second lieutenant in the United States Cavalry.

Dudley's first assignment was with the 11th Cavalry Regiment, at the Presidio of San Francisco, on 12 September 1930 to 28 May 1934. He married Lillian Steinschneider in New York City on 12 September 1931. He then went to Fort Riley, Kansas, with 2nd Cavalry Regiment from 15 June to 27 August 1934. He was a student at the Cavalry School there until 14 June 1935, and then became Assistant Post Quartermaster for harvesting hay, with the rank of first lieutenant from 1 August 1935. He attended the Signal Corps School at Fort Monmouth, New Jersey, from 19 August 1935 to 11 June 1936. He was then posted to Fort Brown, Texas, with the 12th Cavalry Regiment.

On 14 August 1936, Dudley transferred to the United States Army Corps of Engineers, and he was the 9th Engineer Regiment at Fort Riley. On 25 September 1938, he entered the Massachusetts Institute of Technology (MIT), from which he graduated with a Master of Science degree in civil engineering on 2 September 1939. His thesis was entitled An Experimental Investigation of the Upper and Lower Critical Velocities for Open Channels and his advisor was Kenneth C. Reynolds. He then attended the Army Engineer School at Fort Belvoir, Virginia, from 14 September 1939 to 2 February 1940. He was promoted to captain on 12 June 1940.

== World War II ==
=== Construction in the United States ===
Dudley was the Area Engineer for the Hornell, New York, from 3 July 1940 to 1 April 1941. He was then the executive officer of the Binghamton, New York, Engineer District, until 1 February 1942, and the Syracuse, New York, Area Engineer from 4 January 1942 to 3 August 1942. In this last assignment he was also, from 1 February to 25 October 1942, executive officer of the Syracuse District. He was promoted to major in the Army of the United States on 21 March 1942. At this time, the Syracuse District, which was commanded by Colonel James C. Marshall, was responsible for a $250 million civil and military construction program.

Marshall was given a new assignment in June 1942 as district engineer of the Manhattan District, which was responsible for the development of nuclear weapons. Dudley was transferred to the Manhattan District on 25 October 1942, and promoted to lieutenant colonel on 5 November. He was given a special assignment: to find a remote location for the Manhattan Project's Project Y in the vicinity of Albuquerque, New Mexico. In October 1942, he surveyed the area, and he recommended a site near Jemez Springs, New Mexico.

Dudley toured the site with Robert Oppenheimer, Brigadier General Leslie R. Groves, Edwin McMillan and others on 16 November. Oppenheimer feared that the high cliffs surrounding the site would make his people feel claustrophobic, while the engineers were worried about the possibility of flooding. The party then moved on to the vicinity of the Los Alamos Ranch School. Dudley and Groves were concerned about the poor access road, and whether the water supply would be adequate, but otherwise felt that the site was ideal. Originally intended to accommodate 265 people, it would grow into the town of Los Alamos, New Mexico. After the war, Dudley and his wife Lillian discovered that they had both worked on the Manhattan Project, but had not informed each other due to the project's strict security.

=== Southwest Pacific Area ===
On 11 May 1943, Dudley left the Manhattan District and went to Davis-Monthan Army Air Field in Arizona, where he was with the 929th Engineer Aviation Regiment from 16 to 27 May 1943. He then went to Geiger Field in Washington state, where he assumed command of the 931st Engineer Aviation Regiment on 10 June 1943. He was promoted to colonel on 3 January 1944. The 931st Engineer Aviation Regiment departed the San Francisco Port of Embarkation on 29 January 1944, and arrived at Finschhafen in New Guinea on 27 February. The 931st Engineer Aviation Regiment's first assignment was the design and construction of Mokerang Airfield in the Admiralty Islands. The work involved clearing a 1,100-acre (450 ha) plantation with 18,000 coconut trees.

Dudley acted as the base engineer at Finschhafen from 6 May to 3 July 1944, then resumed command of the 931st Engineer Aviation Regiment at Hollandia on 1 August. He became the base engineer there, and oversaw the development of Sentani and Hollandia Airfields. The 931st Engineer Aviation Regiment participated in the Battle of Morotai, where Dudley commanded several engineer aviation battalions and No. 61 Wing RAAF. In addition to airfields, he was also called on to construct roads, bridges, hospitals, staging camps, port facilities and headquarters installations. The 931st Engineer Aviation Regiment became the 931st Engineer Combat Group (Aviation) on 24 November 1944. It moved to Leyte in December, and then Luzon in January. For his services, Dudley was awarded the Legion of Merit.

== Post-war ==
After the war ended, Dudley was the Base Engineer in Nagoya from 9 December 1945 to 9 March 1946, and then commanded the 1190th Base Depot in Yokohama. He was awarded two Commendation Ribbons. He returned to the United States in August 1946, and was stationed at Fort Monroe until 26 August 1947, when he became a student at the Armed Forces Staff College in Norfolk, Virginia. He was then assigned to the map and photograph branch of the Department of the Army in Washington, D.C. He attended the Army War College at Fort Leavenworth, Kansas, in 1950 and 1951, and then returned to Washington, D.C., as the chief of the Planning Branch of the Army Research and Development Division. He was chief engineer of VII Corps in Germany from 1954 to 1956, and was promoted to brigadier general in 1955. He commanded the 18th Engineer Brigade at Fort Leonard Wood, Missouri, from 1956 to 1958. His final assignment was as Assistant Commandant of the Engineer School at Fort Belvoir. He retired in 1960 after thirty years of service, with an oak leaf cluster to his Legion of Merit.

Dudley joined the faculty of California State University in Long Beach, California, where he founded the Soil Mechanics Laboratory. The College of Engineering library there is now named the John H. Dudley Memorial Library in his honor. He retired from California State University in 1970. His wife Lillian died of cancer in 1977. Dudley was a long-time close friend of Lieutenant General James B. Lampert, a fellow graduate of West Point since the two had attended MIT together. Lampert died from cancer in 1978, and Dudley and Lampert's widow Margery (Gerri) married in 1980. Dudley contributed an opening chapter entitled "Ranch School to Secret City" to the 1980 book Reminiscences of Los Alamos 1943–1945.

Dudley died in Fairfax, Virginia, on 2 October 1994, and was buried in the West Point Cemetery beside his first wife.
