= John Dudley (c. 1573 – c. 1622) =

English politician

John Dudley (c. 1573 – c. 1622) was an English politician.

He was a member (MP) of the parliament of England for Carlisle in 1601.
