= Edward Aglionby (died 1599) =

English politician

- Died: December 25, 1599
- Occupation: politician

Edward Aglionby (died 25 December 1599) was an English politician who was murdered.

== Life and career ==
He was son of John Aglionby of Carlisle and educated at Trinity College, Cambridge in 1576. In 1592 he supplied Lord Burghley with an account of local administration and politics on both sides of England's western border with Scotland and English military preparedness in that area. He was until 1597 gunner at Carlisle Castle. He also held the office of Mayor of Carlisle. Aglionby became a retainer of Thomas Warcop (1525 - 1589).

He was a Member (MP) of the Parliament of England for Carlisle in 1584 and 1593 and was Mayor of Carlisle several times.

== Personal life ==
Aglionby married Elizabeth, daughter of Cuthbert Musgrave, with whom he had at least one son and one daughter. He died on Christmas Day (25 December) 1599, after being attacked and run through with a spear when going home at night by men from two families he lived to lay information against.
