= Edward Aglionby (died 1553) =

Member of the Parliament of England

Edward Aglionby (by 1495 – 1553), of Carlisle, Cumberland, was an English politician.

== Biography ==
Aglionby was the son of Thomas Aglionby of Carlisle and Joan Aglionby.

Aglionby held a number of public offices, including Escheator of Cumberland and Westmorland (1527–28), gentleman usher of the chamber in 1534 and constable of Penrith Castle in 1534. He was also the Governor of Carlisle Castle from 1542 until his death, High Sheriff of Cumberland for 1544–45 and Mayor of Carlisle in 1545. He also was a collector of customs at Newcastle in 1538.

In June 1516 he joined with Thomas, 2nd Lord Dacre of Gilsland, and a number of others in commissioning the reconstruction of the bridge over the river Eden. During the rebellions of 1536 he helped to hold Carlisle against Richard Dacre, and Thomas Lamplugh. He was made captain of the new citadel of Carlisle and also served a term as mayor and after several nominations was pricked sheriff of Cumberland in 1544. His last appointment was to the commission on church goods in Cumberland in March 1553. He was appointed by King Henry VIII as a Captain on the Scottish borders in 1524, and he remained militarily active under successive Wardens of the Western March until 1543. He also accompanied the king's embassy to France in 1532.

Aglionby was a Member of Parliament for Carlisle in 1529 and 1547.

== Personal life ==
He married Anne Middleton (?) and had three sons and three other daughters whose names are not recorded. His sons were:
1) Thomas Aglionby (died by 1536)
2) John Aglionby (died 1584)
3) Edward Aglionby (c.1520-1590/1591)
His son John Aglionby was also a member of Parliament of Carlisle. Edward Aglionby died on 4 July 1553.
