= Cumbrian MPs =

In 1974, under the Local Government Act 1972, the administrative counties of Cumberland and Westmorland were abolished, and were combined with parts of Lancashire and Yorkshire to form the non-metropolitan county of Cumbria.

The ceremonial county of Cumbria is divided into two unitary authorities: Cumberland, and Westmoreland and Furness.

The first section lists Members of parliament for the old counties of Cumberland and Westmorland, and the second section for the county of Cumbria.

== Cumberland and Westmorland ==
=== Cockermouth ===
The Cockermouth constituency was abolished in 1918, when it became part of the Workington Constituency.

- George Fletcher, Whig, 1698-1701
- Anthony Lowther, 1721-1722
- Charles Jenkinson, 1761-1767
- John Anstruther, 1790-1796
- Robert Plumer Ward, 1802-1806
- John Osborn, 1807-1808
- William Lowther, 2nd Earl of Lonsdale, 1808-1813
- Edward Horsman, Liberal, 1836-1852
- Richard Bourke, 6th Earl of Mayo, 1857–68.
- Wilfred Lawson, Liberal, 1885-1900
- Sir John Scurrah Randles, Conservative, 1900–1906
- Wilfred Lawson, Liberal, 1906
- Sir John Scurrah Randles, Conservative, 1906–1910
- Sir Wilfrid Lawson, 3rd Baronet, of Brayton, 1910-1916
- Joseph Bliss, 1916-1918

=== Workington ===
The Workington Constituency was created by the Representation of the People Act 1918, which also abolished the constituency of Cockermouth.

- Thomas Cape, 1918–1945
- Fred Peart, Labour, 1945–1976, now Baron Peart, of Workington
- Richard Page, Conservative, 1976-1979
- Dale Campbell-Savours, Labour, 1979-1983

=== Whitehaven ===
The Whitehaven constituency, created 1832, was renamed Copeland constituency in 1983.

- William Lowther, 2nd Earl of Lonsdale, 1832–1833
- Robert Hudson, Conservative, 1924-1929
- Frank Anderson, Labour, 1945-1959
- Joseph Bede Symonds, Labour, 1959-1970
- Jack Cunningham, Labour, 1970-1983

=== Penrith ===
- Henry Charles Howard, 1885-1886
- James William Lowther 1886-1918

=== Penrith and Cockermouth ===
- James William Lowther, Conservative, 1918-1921
- Sir Henry Cecil Lowther, Coalition Conservative, 1921-1922
- Levi Collison, Liberal, 1922-1923
- Arthur Carlyne Niven Dixey, Conservative, 1923-1935
- Alan Vincent Gandar Dower, Conservative, 1935-1950

=== Penrith & the Border ===
- Lt.-Col. A V G Dower, Conservative, 1945-1950
- R D Scott, Conservative, 1950-1955
- William Whitelaw, Conservative, 1955-1983

=== Carlisle ===
- Wilfrid Lawson, 1859-1865
- Edgar Grierson, Labour, 1945-1950
- Alfred Hargreaves, Labour, 1950-1955
- Dr Donald Johnson, Conservative, 1955-1964
- Ron Lewis, Labour, 1964-1983

=== Westmorland ===
The Parliament constituency of Westmorland was renamed Westmorland and Lonsdale in 1983

- Anthony Lowther, 1722-1741
- William Lowther, 2nd Earl of Lonsdale, 1813–1831
- William Lowther, 2nd Earl of Lonsdale, 1833–1841
- William Fletcher-Vane, Conservative, 1945-1959
- Michael Jopling, Conservative, 1959-1983

=== Barrow-in-Furness ===
- Walter Monslow (Labour Party) 1945-1966
- Albert Booth (Labour Party) 1966-1983

== Cumbria ==
This section lists Members of parliament for the new county of Cumbria since the re-organisation in 1983

=== Penrith and The Border ===
- David Maclean, Conservative, 1983-2010
- Rory Stewart, Conservative, 2010-2019
- Neil Hudson, Conservative, 2019-2024

=== Barrow and Furness ===
- Cecil Franks, Conservative, 1983-1992
- John Hutton, Labour, 1992-2010
- John Woodcock, Labour Co-operative, 2010-2019
- Simon Fell, Conservative, 2019-2024

=== Westmorland and Lonsdale ===
- Michael Jopling, Baron Jopling, Conservative, 1983-1997
- Tim Collins, Conservative, 1997-2005
- Tim Farron, LibDem, 2005-

=== Copeland ===
- Jack Cunningham, Labour, 1983-2005
- Jamie Reed, Labour, 2005-2017
- Trudy Harrison, Conservative, 2017-2024

=== Workington ===
- Dale Campbell-Savours, Labour, 1983-2001 - now Baron Campbell-Savours
- Tony Cunningham, Labour, 2001-2015
- Sue Hayman, Labour, 2015-2019 - now Baroness Hayman of Ullock
- Mark Jenkinson, Conservative, 2019-2024

=== Carlisle ===
- Ron Lewis, Labour, 1983-1987
- Eric Martlew, Labour, 1987-2010
- John Stevenson, Conservative, 2010-2024

== Sources ==
- Historical listings of Members of Parliament - lists, for example, all 72 MPs for Cockermouth from 1660 to 1918
