= Newton Rigg College =

Former agricultural college in Penrith, England

Coordinates: 54.671°N 2.789°W

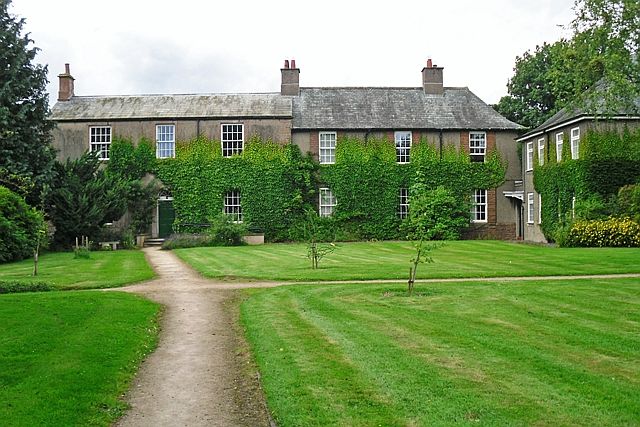
The original Newton Rigg farmhouse, on the left, with later extensions

Newton Rigg College was an agricultural college near Penrith, Cumbria, England, founded in 1896 as the Cumberland and Westmorland Farm School. From 2011 it was part of Askham Bryan College, which in 2020 announced that it would close in 2021.

== History ==
The Cumberland and Westmorland Farm School was founded in 1896 by Henry Charles Howard, of Greystoke Castle, MP for Penrith. Local business leaders involved in the committee which led to its foundation included builder George Henry Pattinson JP, OBE, engineer Gilbert Gilkes and paper-maker James Cropper. Newton Rigg farm, between Newton Reigny and Penrith, was bought to be the school's premises. Initially the school offered dairying courses for girls in summer, and farming courses for boys in the winter when they had less farm work and could be spared.

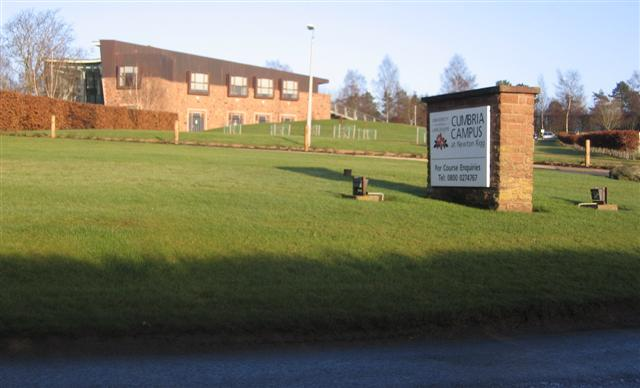
Seen in 2006 when it was part of University of Central Lancashire

In 1967 the school was renamed the Cumberland and Westmorland College of Agriculture and Forestry and home to the newly established National School of Forestry. The college became part of the University of Central Lancashire in 1998. Its website 1998 uses the name "Newton Rigg College" with the strapline "The Centre for Learning in the Heart of Cumbria" and has a logo showing an image of a green cultivated field with hills and mountains in the background; it is described as a "partner college" of the University of Central Lancashire. Its mission statement at that date was "To strive for excellence in the provision of high quality education and training on a sound economic basis, with the main sphere of operation being the rural economy and land based industries." Newton Rigg was transferred to the new University of Cumbria in 2007. In 2011 it became part of Askham Bryan College, an agricultural college based near York.

== Recent years ==
In 2014 the Frank Parkinson Building was opened, providing teaching, library, reception and office accommodation, as part of a £3m development plan and with the support of the Frank Parkinson Agricultural Trust.

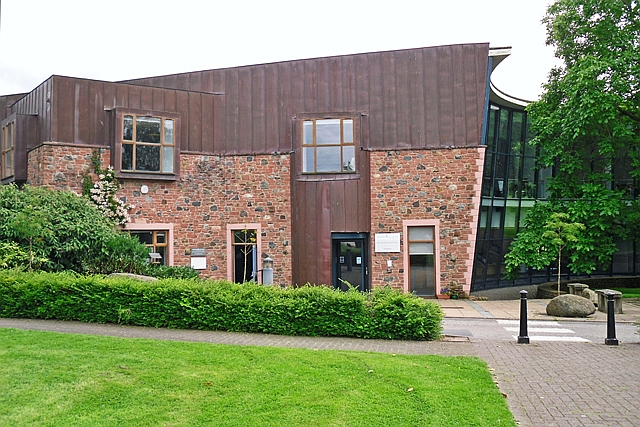
The Frank Parkinson Building seen in 2017

In 2019-2020 there were 888 students, made up of 667 further education students and 221 apprentices; in 2020-2021 there were 536 students, being 440 FE students and 96 apprentices. The college taught the land-based subjects of agriculture, gamekeeping, animal and equine management, forestry, horticulture and agricultural engineering, and more general further education courses including indoor and outdoor sport, hairdressing and beauty therapy, childhood studies and health and social care.

The Northern School of Game and Wildlife, a department of Newton Rigg, was described as "One of the UK's premier gamekeeping colleges", and was the only such college to have its own grouse moor.

After much discussion and despite local campaigning, it was announced in 2020 that Newton Rigg would close in July 2021. As of January 2021 a local organisation Newton Rigg Ltd. attempted to develop horticulture courses, stating that they were "working to keep Newton Rigg College open, realise its potential and protect its future for generations to come". Their attempts failed, although Newton Rigg Equestrian which had been developed as the primary income source for Newton Rigg Ltd was a sustainable stand alone business. As a result, both Newton Rigg Ltd and Newton Rigg Equestrian were closed.

The closure of the college was discussed on 23 March 2021 by the Environment, Food and Rural Affairs parliamentary select committee, along with "the future of land-based education".

In July 2021 it was announced that the Ernest Cook Trust had bought the college's hill farm, Low Beckside Farm, "with the promise of maintaining it as a resource for agricultural education", In August 2021 it was reported that the rest of the campus had been sold, with The Leo Group, owners of Penrith based Omega Proteins, said to be "involved in the process".

Newton Rigg Estate was purchased in partnership by local business A W Jenkinson (the Equestrian facilities) and the Leo Group. Working in partnership they have a developed a new 4G football facility and sports hall. Newton Rigg Estate (the Leo Group) are developing the site as a whole, which now includes the 20 bedroom Herdman Hotel, Conference Facilities and soon-to-be-opened Bar/restaurant, Padel Courts and Gym.
