= Daniel Sawrij =

British businessman (born 1969)

- Born: Daniel 'Danny' Sawrij; 22 June 1969 (age 56)
- Occupation: Business executive

Daniel 'Danny' Sawrij (born 22 June 1969) is the managing director of the Leo Group, a waste recycling and animal by-products company. He took over the company in 1988 from Margaret and Leo Sawrij, his mother and father. He has an estimated personal wealth of £360m and was ranked 932nd on the Sunday Times Rich List 2013.

== Early life ==
Sawrij is the youngest of six children. He was educated at Halifax Catholic High School, but left at the age of 14 to work on his father's farm, which bought and sold cattle and bred mink and foxes for the fur industry. He met his wife, Joanne, at the age of 17, with whom he now has three children and several grandkids.

== Career ==
Sawrij took over the family business and its six staff from his father in 1988 at the age of 19, when the company was still called Swalesmoor Mink Farm. Sawrij began to transition the company towards the maggot breeding business, selling to fishing tackle shops. At the same time, it was also mixing food for small pet food companies, which later became a significant part of the company's operations. Sawrij has now expanded the Leo Group in the renewable energy sector, specifically by turning animals and food waste into biomass fuel to produce electricity.

Sawrij changed the company name to Leo Sawrij Ltd. in 1993 in memory of his father who died that year. In 2003, he was involved in a failed legal challenge to overturn the ban on farming mink in the UK.

== Controversy ==
In May 2013, Sawrij was fined £300 plus £150 costs by Kirklees Magistrates Court after he was found guilty of failing to ensure that his lorry drivers had properly logged their hours. Earlier in May 2013, Sawrij admitted 134 charges of failing to ensure lorry drivers logged their hours while he was director of Alba Transport, which was part of the Leo Group, but is now in liquidation. During a two-month investigation period which involved 44 vehicles, 2,000 hours were wrongly recorded. The Vehicle and Operator Services Agency uncovered the failing after it began investigating two years earlier. Sawrij had a further eight charges put to him linked to not releasing paperwork when requested, which he also admitted.

In June 2002, the Leo Group lost its 0-licence following convictions under the Environmental Protection Act. These convictions related to two offences of keeping controlled waste on land without a waste management licence, as well as one offence of knowingly permitting abattoir effluent to enter a water course, and resulted in a £10,500 fine. Danny Sawrij was convicted of similar offences and received fines of the same amount.
