= Robert Mowbray Howard =

Robert Mowbray Howard JP DL

Personal details
- Born: 23 May 1854
- Died: 2 October 1928 (aged 74)
- Spouse(s): Louisa Georgina Sneyd (m. 1881; died 1910) Audrey Cecilia Campbell (after 1912) Louisa Felicia Welby (m. 1927)
- Relations: Henry Howard (brother); Stafford Howard (brother); Esme Howard, 1st Baron Howard of Penrith (brother); Lord Henry Howard-Molyneux-Howard (grandfather)
- Children: 3
- Parent(s): Henry Howard; Charlotte Caroline Georgina Long

Robert Mowbray Howard Esquire JP DL (23 May 1854 – 2 October 1928) was a British official and editor.

== Early life ==
Howard was born on 23 May 1854. He was the third son of Henry Howard (1802–1875) of Greystoke Castle and the former Charlotte Caroline Georgina Long. His siblings included Henry Howard, Stafford Howard, Elizabeth Catherine Howard (wife of their cousin, Henry Herbert, 4th Earl of Carnarvon), Maud Isabel Howard (wife of Francis William Leyborne Popham of Littlecote House) and Esme Howard who was created the 1st Baron Howard of Penrith.

His maternal grandparents were Henry Lawes Long and Catharine Long of Hampton Lodge. His paternal grandparents were Lord Henry Howard-Molyneux-Howard and Elizabeth Long (a daughter of Edward Long, the British colonial administrator). Among his extended family were aunts Henrietta Molyneux-Howard (wife of Henry Herbert, 3rd Earl of Carnarvon), Isabella Howard (wife of Charles Howard, 17th Earl of Suffolk), Charlotte Howard (wife of James Wentworth Buller), and Juliana Howard (wife of Sir John Ogilvy, 9th Baronet). Howard's great-uncle, Bernard Howard inherited the Dukedom of Norfolk in 1815 and his grandfather was granted the courtesy title "Lord", the style of a younger son of a duke, in 1817.

== Career ==
From the Long family, he inherited the Hampton Estate in Seale, Surrey which comprised most of the non-forested, agricultural land in Seale is appurtenant to (attached to or let by the owners of) Hampton Lodge, a Grade II listed Regency period mansion of c. 1810. The tall two-storey house is Stuccoed brick to its façade with mansard slate roofs and some fishscale banding and was sold to Eustace Thornton in 1929. He lived at Ignors in Compton, Surrey and at Bluemire in Threlkeld. He was a member of Arthur's, the London gentlemen's club, which was established in 1811 and was disbanded in 1940.

Howard held the office of Justice of the Peace for Surrey and Deputy Lieutenant of Surrey.

In 1925, he edited Records and Letters of the Family of the Longs of Longville, Jamaica, and Hampton Lodge, Surrey which was published in London by Simpkin, Marshall, Hamilton, Kent & Co. Ltd.

== Personal life ==
On 6 October 1881, Howard was married to Louisa Georgina Sneyd (1861–1910), a daughter of the Rev. Walter Sneyd, a bibliophile and antiquarian, and Henrietta Elizabeth Sneyd. Her grandfathers, Walter Sneyd of Keele Hall and Richard Malone Sneyd of Cherryvale, were brothers. They were the parents of:

- Muriel Isabel Catherine Howard (1882–1959), who married Second lieutenant Tudor Ralph Castle (1883–1916), who was killed in action. He was a son of William Henry Castle.
- Maj. Henry Ralph Mowbray Howard (1883–1950), (Note: Louisa's uncle, Ralph Sneyd (1793–1870), inherited Keele Hall, and the Sneyd estates, and rebuilt it to the design of Anthony Salvin at a cost of about 80,000 pounds. On his death, the estate passed to her father. Her younger brother, Ralph Sneyd (1863–1949), took little interest in the Sneyd estate after his appointment as a Colonel of the Staffordshire Yeomanry during World War I. After Ralph died childless in 1949, Louisa's son Henry inherited the estate but died the following year, which reduced the family fortune by three quarters due to the doubling of death duties going to the Exchequer. The remaining, unsold, parts of the estate were broken up by his heirs.) who married Helen Millicent James, a sister of Audrey and Edward James, children of American merchant William Dodge James (son of Daniel James and brother of Frank Linsly James and John Arthur James) and the British aristocrat Evelyn Elizabeth Forbes (a daughter of the 4th Baronet of Newe). The James' were frequent hosts to Edward, Prince of Wales at their estate, West Dean House. They divorced in 1931 and he married, secondly, Janet Emma Jameson Duthie, a daughter of John Duthie.
- Lt. Lyulph Walter Mowbray Howard (1885–1915), who was killed in action in Arras, France.

He married, secondly, Audrey Cecilia Campbell, daughter of Charles Hallyburton Campbell (son of the Sir George Campbell) and the former Evelyn Stuart, on 12 September 1912. Audrey died on 28 January 1926.

He married, thirdly, Louisa Felicia Welby (d. 1956), daughter of William Earle Welby (older brother of Reginald Welby, 1st Baron Welby) and the former Adeline Fane, on 28 April 1927.

Howard died on 2 October 1928. He was buried at St Laurence's Churchyard in Seale, Surrey.

=== Descendants ===
Through his son Henry, he was a grandfather of Diana Katherine Howard (1913–2003) (wife of Richard Beresford), Pamela Evelyn Howard (1914–1998) (wife of Ian Karslake), Audrey Elizabeth Howard (1916–1994) (wife of Lt.-Col. Ronald Kaulback), Rosemary Millicent Howard (1917–1986) (wife of Guy Anderson and, secondly, Michael Lily), Joan Margery Howard (1921–2001) (wife of Hubert Murray Sturges), and Thomas Henry Gavin Howard-Sneyd (1940–2010) (who married Serena Patience Lumley).
