= List of Cumbria-related topics =

This is a list of articles related to the English county of Cumbria. See also the Category:Cumbria for links to the Cumbrian pages (e.g., towns, villages, railway stations, places of interest, people born in Cumbria, etc.)

== People ==
See the category Cumbria below for people born in Cumbria. This lists people not native to Cumbria but who had connections with Cumbria.

=== Writers ===
- William Wordsworth – England's most famous poet, born in Cockermouth, lived in Grasmere
- John Ruskin – writer and conservationist – lived at Coniston
- W. G. Collingwood – writer and secretary to John Ruskin
- Arthur Ransome – writer of Swallows and Amazons
- Robert Southey – Lakes Poet
- Samuel Taylor Coleridge – Lakes poet
- Hartley Coleridge – writer, and son of Samuel Taylor Coleridge
- Thomas de Quincey – associated with the Lake Poets
- Beatrix Potter – children's author and conservationist
- Hugh Walpole – author – lived at Keswick
- Alfred Wainwright – guide book author – see List of Wainwrights
- John Cunliffe – author of Postman Pat, an animated BBC series featuring a postman in the fictional village of Greendale (inspired by the real valley of Longsleddale in Cumbria). The author lived in Kendal.

=== Artists ===
- William James Blacklock – 19th century landscape artist
- Josefina de Vasconcellos – sculptor
- Henry Holiday – Stained glass window designer
- Edward Burne-Jones – Stained glass window designer
- William Morris – Stained glass window maker
- Kurt Schwitters – German artist who came to live in Ambleside
- L. S. Lowry – artist who created many drawings of Cumbria
- Winifred Nicholson – painter, who lived near Lanercost
- Ken Russell – film director, who lived in Borrowdale, Keswick for a while. Several of his films included local scenes.

=== Architects ===
- Sir Robert Smirke – architect of many major buildings, including Lowther Castle, and Carlisle citadel
- Sydney Smirke – architect of several important buildings in Whitehaven
- Anthony Salvin – restorer and architect of several important buildings in Cumbria, including Lanercost Priory, Hutton-in-the-Forest, Muncaster Castle, and Derwent Isle House
- Thomas Rickman – architect – various, including Rose Castle and Scaleby Castle
- Giles Gilbert Scott – architect – Ambleside church
- William Butterfield – architect – several churches
- Augustus Pugin – architect – railway cottages at Windermere station
- C.F.A. Voysey – architect – houses at Bowness-on-Windermere and Kendal
- Philip Webb – architect – Brampton, St Martin's Church
- Hardwicke Rawnsley – ecologist, and founder of the National Trust.
- Francis Dunnery – singer and songwriter, formerly of the band It Bites
- Princess Louise, Duchess of Argyll – daughter of Queen Victoria, and early supporter of the National Trust in its birthplace at Borrowdale near Keswick. She was the Trust's first President.
- Anne Clifford – restorer of churches at Appleby-in-Westmorland, Ninekirks, Brougham, Mallerstang; and castles at Brough, Skipton and Appleby.
- Thomas Mawson – landscape gardener.
- Donald Campbell – World Record Water Speed challenger.
- Fletcher Christian – master's mate on board HMS Bounty.
- Chris Bonington – mountaineer, now living in Cumbria.
- John Paul Jones – Naval officer in the American Revolutionary War, born in Kirkcudbrightshire who began his maritime career sailing out of Whitehaven as apprentice aboard the Friendship at only seventy years of age. Years later he returned in USS Ranger hoping to sink all Whitehaven's ships anchored in harbour (numbered between 200 and 400), before setting the town itself ablaze.
- George Fox and Margaret Fell – important players in the founding of the Religious Society of Friends who lived at Swarthmoor Hall.
- Ann Macbeth – a famous embroideress who lived at Patterdale.
- William Cavendish, 7th Duke of Devonshire – whose home was at Holker Hall.
- Edward Haughey, Baron Ballyedmond – whose home is Corby Castle.
- Stan Laurel – of Laurel & Hardy fame. Born in Ulverston.
- British Sea Power – half of the band come from near Kendal, Cumbria
- Wild Beasts – indie band from Kendal, Cumbria
- Christine McVie - musician in band Fleetwood Mac. Born in Bouth, Cumbria.

== Sport ==
=== Football ===
- Carlisle United F.C. – only league team in Cumbria. Currently playing in League Two
- Barrow A.F.C. – currently playing in the Conference National
- Workington A.F.C. – currently playing in the Conference North

=== Rugby League ===
- Barrow Raiders - based in the Betfred Championship
- Barrow Raiders Ladies - based in the Women's Super League
- Workington Town & Whitehaven – based in Betfred League1

== Natural materials ==
- Graphite – used in the pencil making industry in Keswick. The graphite deposit found at Borrowdale was extremely pure and solid and it could easily be sawed into sticks. This was and remains the only deposit of graphite ever found in this solid form.
- Gypsum – used in the Plasterboard industry
- Coal – west coast mining industry, e.g. Haig Pit at Whitehaven
- Haematite – west coast mining industry, e.g. Florence mine at Egremont
- Anhydrite – found at Whitehaven, where it was used in the early manufacture of sulphuric acid, and at Kirkby Thore, where it is used in the Plaster industry
- Slate is found at various locations throughout Cumbria, with the Honister slate mine at Borrowdale now a major tourist attraction
- Lead was mined extensively in Nenthead from the 18th century until the early part of the 20th century

== Industrial processes ==
- Nuclear reprocessing – at Sellafield
- Thorp nuclear fuel reprocessing plant – part of Sellafield
- Blast furnace – e.g. the Duddon Furnace near Broughton-in-Furness
- Bessemer process – invented by Henry Bessemer and used at the Workington Steel Works
- Wind power and Wind generators surrounding much of the Lake District
- Very Low Frequency transmitters – at Anthorn and Skelton for submarine communications
- Phosphoric acid and Sulphuric acid – once made in vast quantities at the Marchon Chemical Company plant at Whitehaven. Phosphoric acid was made by adding the manufactured sulphuric acid to Calcium phosphate rock, brought by ship from Morocco to Whitehaven harbour.

== Major employers ==
- Cumbria County Council
- BAE Systems Submarine Solutions, once Vickers Shipbuilding and Engineering Ltd, and Vickers – in Barrow-in-Furness
- BNFL – British Nuclear Fuels – owners and operators of the Nuclear reprocessing site – at Sellafield, and the world's first nuclear power station, Calder Hall, now closed.
- McVitie's part of United Biscuits – the UK's second largest biscuit factory in Carlisle
- Corus Group, previously British Steel plc – makers of railway lines in Workington – closed down Summer 2006.

== History ==
- Cumbria is a county where you can find many Stone circles – including the impressive Castlerigg stone circle near Keswick
- Cumbria is on the border between England and Scotland, and defensive Peel towers were built to protect the English from invaders, the Border Reivers.
- The Roman Empire built Hadrian's Wall dividing England and Scotland, and various forts throughout Cumbria, including Hardknott Roman Fort in Eskdale
- The Dovenby Hall estate in Dovenby, near Cockermouth, dates from 1154 and has been used, amongst other things, as a private residence, a mental institution, and, most recently, as home of the Ford Rally Team.
- Clifton Moor Skirmish – the last battle on English soil between the Jacobite forces of Prince Charles Stuart and the English army commanded by the Duke of Cumberland at Clifton near Penrith.

== Other pages of interest ==
- The year 2001 proved to be a terrible year for Cumbria because of the foot and mouth crisis, suffering 893 confirmed cases of the disease out of a total of 2030 cases in the UK. The effects of some 10 months of this crisis on some businesses were immense, and many rural pubs, B&B's and other tourist-related shops closed forever due to little income during 2001. See more information about foot and mouth disease.
- Cumberland sausage – local food product
- Cumbrian dialect – a colourful, descriptive dialect that borrows word origins from Cumbric, Norse and other ancient languages.
- Cumbrian MPs – a list of past and present Cumbrian members of parliament
- Herdwick sheep – the local fell sheep, gives some of the best lamb meat available
- The Spadeadam Rocket Establishment, near Carlisle, was opened in the late 1950s as a test area for the British Intermediate Range Ballistic Missile (IRBM) – Blue Streak
- Cumbria is one of the few places in England where you can still find the red squirrel, the osprey, the hen harrier, and the golden eagle
- Center Parcs – operators of the Whinfell Forest Oasis holiday village near Penrith
- Depleted uranium – in the Solway Firth from weapons testing (at Eskmeals and Dundrennan Range) and weapons dumping
- Jennings Brewery – in Cockermouth
- Musical Stones of Skiddaw at the Keswick Museum and Art Gallery
- The Luck of Edenhall – a legendary drinking glass
- Dykes – Cumbrian surname
- Kendal Mint Cake
