= 1921 Penrith and Cockermouth by-election =

Parliamentary by-election in England

- 13 May 1921
Candidate	Lowther	Collison
Party	Unionist	Liberal
Popular vote	7,678	7,647
Percentage	50.1%	49.9%
MP before election
Lowther
Unionist
Subsequent MP
Collison
Liberal

The 1921 Penrith and Cockermouth by-election was a parliamentary by-election held for the British House of Commons constituency of Penrith and Cockermouth in Cumberland on 13 May 1921.

== Vacancy ==
The by-election was caused by the resignation of the sitting Unionist Member of Parliament (MP), the Right Hon. James Lowther. Lowther was retiring as Speaker of the House of Commons and was created Viscount Ullswater later in 1921.

== Candidates ==
The election was a straight fight between Major-General Cecil Lowther, the brother of the retiring MP, soldier and former big game hunter for the Unionists and Levi Collison, an art printer from Preston in Lancashire for the Asquithian Independent Liberal Party.

== Issues ==
=== Liberals ===
For the Liberals, the by-election was an opportunity to attack the record of the Coalition government of David Lloyd George. They particularly tried to highlight the waste and inefficiency of the government with the local farming community. They were however hampered by years of political inactivity and poor organisation in the constituency. It was reported that Collison, despite his principal trade of art printer, had considerable experience of farming, advocated an advanced agricultural policy and that many local farmers regarded him as a real friend. Collison also favoured some degree of nationalisation in the mining industry, which was less popular, even against the background of coal strikes which had made supplies in the area scarce.

=== Government ===
Lowther strongly attacked all forms of socialism and schemes of nationalisation, raising the spectre of land nationalisation if the electorate deserted the coalition. He also hoped to gain votes through his family association with the previous MP who had held the seat since 1886 and with Speaker Lowther's son, Christopher who was Coalition Tory MP in nearby North Cumberland.

== The result ==
The by-election resulted in a narrow win for the Coalition candidate, a majority of just 31 votes out of 15,325 cast. Lowther commented that the result of the election showed the public did not favour nationalisation and did not wish to see Ireland given complete independence. Collison's attacks on government extravagance were seen as the reason he came so near to gaining the seat. Lowther and Collison faced each other again in the 1922 general election with Collison successful on that occasion by 378 votes.

== The votes ==
Penrith and Cockermouth by-election, 1921
Party		Candidate	Votes	%	±%
C	Unionist	Cecil Lowther	7,678	50.1	N/A
	Liberal	Levi Collison	7,647	49.9	N/A
Majority			31	0.2	N/A
Turnout			15,325	74.0	N/A
	Unionist hold		Swing	N/A	
C indicates candidate endorsed by the coalition government.

== See also ==
- List of United Kingdom by-elections
- United Kingdom by-election records
