= Robert Mowbray =

Robert Mowbray may refer to:

- Robert de Mowbray (died 1125)
- Sir Robert Mowbray, 2nd Baronet (1850–1916), British Conservative politician

== See also ==
- Robert Mowbray Howard (1854–1928), British official and editor
