= Hubert Howard =

Hon. Hubert John Edward Dominic Howard (23 December 1907 – 17 February 1987) was an English intelligence officer from the Howard family who lived in Italy.

== Early life ==
Howard was born in Washington, D.C., on 23 December 1907. He was educated at Downside School in Somerset and at Trinity College, Cambridge. He was the third of five sons of the diplomat Sir Esmé William Howard, 1st Baron Howard of Penrith, by his wife, Lady Isabella Giovanna Teresa Gioachina Giustiniani-Bandini. Among his brothers were Francis Howard, 2nd Baron Howard of Penrith and journalist Henry Howard. His father later served as His Majesty's Ambassador to the United States of America from 1924 to 1930.

His father was the fourth son of MP Henry Howard of Greystoke Castle (eldest son of Lord Henry Howard-Molyneux-Howard, a younger brother of Bernard Howard, 12th Duke of Norfolk). and the former Charlotte Caroline Georgiana Long (eldest daughter of Henry Lawes Long of Hampton Lodge and Lady Catherine Walpole, a daughter of Robert Walpole, 2nd Earl of Orford). His maternal grandparents were Sigismondo Niccolo Venanzio Gaetano Francisco Giustiniani-Bandini, 1st Prince Bandini-Giustiniani and 8th Earl of Newburgh and Maria Sophia Angelica Massani (daughter and co-heiress of Cavaliere Giuseppe Maria Massani of Rome).

== Career ==
Early in 1940, Howard volunteered for the British expeditionary force to Finland. In 1941, he was assigned to the Allies' Psychological Warfare Branch (PWB) in Italy, with which he served as an intelligence officer throughout the Italian campaign.

== Personal life ==
On 17 September 1951, Howard was married to Lelia Calista Ada Caetani (1913–1977), painter and plantswoman, the only daughter of Marguerite (née Chapin) Caetani and the noted composer Roffredo Caetani, 17th Duke of Sermoneta and 8th Prince of Teano, who was the last of her 1,000-year-old family line. There were no children of the marriage. His wife died on 11 January 1977. Howard died ten years later on 17 February 1987, aged 79.

The couple continued the restoration of the Caetani family's garden at their estate of Ninfa, Lazio, which Lelia had inherited on the death of her brother, who died on the Albanian front in 1940. The couple transformed it into one of the most widely admired gardens in Italy. The garden is laid out among the romantic ruins of a small castle and village which had been abandoned in 1381, set on the edge of the Pontine Marshes south of Rome. Today over 10,000 shrubs, plants and flowering trees grow among the medieval ruins and a lake formed by damming the river Ninfa. The garden owes little to the formal Italian style, but is developed in an English tradition of plantsmanship and painterly sensitivity. Ninfa has been described as "the most romantic garden in the world". Ownership of the garden was transferred to the Roffredo Caetani Foundation, named after the father of Lelia Howard, which continues to manage the garden today. It is open to the public at set times from April to November.
