= Levi Collison =

British politician (1875–1965)

Levi Collison (28 December 1875 – 22 October 1965) was an English art publisher and printer and Liberal member of parliament.

== Private life ==
Levi Collison was born in Preston, Lancashire, and educated at private schools. He married and had two sons and two daughters. In 1925, Collison was described as a country gentleman from St Annes on Sea. At that time he resided at Barton Grange, Barton near Preston and he lived there until 1943 when the house was requisitioned by the War Office as a mess for the Women's Auxiliary Air Force.

== Career ==
By profession, Collison was a printer and publisher of art books and founded his own company, Collison's Ltd, of which he was chairman and managing director. He also had other business interests. He was a trustee of Preston Savings Bank and a chairman of a number of companies. Collison also served as a justice of the peace.

== Politics ==
=== Penrith and Cockermouth by-election ===
In 1921, Collison was selected as Liberal candidate for the by-election in Penrith and Cockermouth caused by the resignation of the sitting Coalition Conservative MP and Speaker of the House of Commons, James Lowther. In a tight contest, Collison just failed to gain the seat for the Independent Asquithian Liberals, losing by 31 votes.

=== 1922-1923 ===
Collison fought the Penrith and Cockermouth seat again at the 1922 general election. In another straight fight and facing the same Tory candidate as he had at the by-election, Major-General Cecil Lowther, Collison gained the seat by a majority of 378. However, at the general election of 1923 he was unable to hold his seat, losing to the new Conservative candidate Arthur Dixey.

=== Liberal National ===
He did not stand for Parliament again but retained his link with Liberal politics holding the office of Chairman and President of the Preston Liberal Association. However, in the crisis which overtook the Liberal Party after the formation of the National Government in 1931, Collison associated himself with the Liberal National group led by Sir John Simon. He was a founder member of the Liberal National Council in July 1932 and later held the office of President of Preston Liberal Nationals.

== Death ==
Collison died on 22 October 1965, aged 90.

Parliament of the United Kingdom
Preceded by Cecil Lowther	Member of Parliament for Penrith and Cockermouth; 1922–1923	Succeeded by Arthur Dixey
