= 1915 Appleby by-election =

UK Parliamentary by-election

The 1915 Appleby by-election was held on 27 October 1915. The by-election was held due to the incumbent Conservative MP, Sir Lancelot Sanderson, becoming a judge on the High Court of Justice. It was won by the Conservative candidate Cecil Lowther who was unopposed due to a War-time electoral pact.
