= Cecil Lowther =

British general and Conservative politician

Major-General Sir Cecil Lowther KCMG CB CVO DSO FRGS
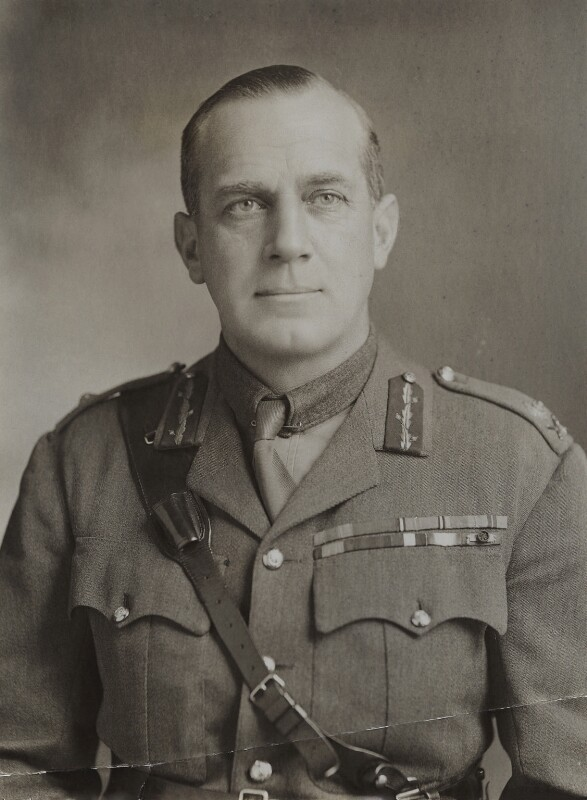
- Lowther in 1918

Member of Parliament for Penrith and Cockermouth
- In office 1921–1922

Member of Parliament for Appleby
- In office 1915–1918

Personal details
- Born: 1 January 1869 Ampthill, Bedfordshire, England
- Died: 1 November 1940 (aged 71) Basingstoke, Hampshire, England
- Party: Conservative
- Spouse: Dorothy Harvey (m. 1920)
- Parent: William Lowther (father)
- Relatives: James Lowther (brother)
- Education: Clifton College
- Military career
- Branch: Scots Guards
- Rank: Major-General
- Commands: 1st Battalion Scots Guards; 1st Army Corps; 1st (Guards) Brigade
- Conflicts: Second Boer War
- Awards: Queen's South Africa Medal; Distinguished Service Order; Légion d'honneur

Major-General Sir Henry Cecil Lowther, KCMG, CB, CVO, DSO, FRGS (1 January 1869 – 1 November 1940) was a British general and Conservative politician, big-game hunter and adventurer.

== Career ==
Born in Ampthill, Bedfordshire, he was the fourth son of William Lowther.

Educated at Clifton College, he was commissioned into the Scots Guards as a second lieutenant on 29 December 1888, promoted to lieutenant on 13 April 1892, and to captain on 24 June 1899. He had been made adjutant of his battalion in February 1896.

When the Second Boer War broke out in October 1899, the 1st Battalion of the Scots Guards departed Ireland for South Africa to join up with the 1st Guards Brigade, with Lowther appointed as the battalion's adjutant. They reached that country in November, and immediately saw action in the battles of Belmont and Modder River, both British victories, though at a heavy cost in British life. In December, the battalion was present at the Battle of Magersfontein, and the following year took part in the march to take the Boer capitals of Bloemfontein and Pretoria. After taking the latter city, the 1st Guards Brigade took part in the Battle of Diamond Hill (June 1900), and in the last large scale battle of the war at Bergendal in August 1900. The war then became a guerrilla war, and Lowther was on 20 July 1901 appointed to a staff position as staff captain for Intelligence. For his service in the war, Lowther received the Queen's South Africa Medal, was appointed a Companion of the Distinguished Service Order (DSO), and was noted for future staff employment.

After the war had ended, Lowther was back as a regular officer in the 1st battalion of his regiment in September 1902, but three months later was seconded for a Staff appointment as brigade major, Foot Guards brigade in the 1st Army Corps on 3 December 1902. In October 1903 he was then appointed as a staff captain at headquarters.

In October 1911 he was promoted to the temporary rank of lieutenant colonel while assigned to the personal staff of the governor general of Canada, becoming his military secretary. In October 1913, on the eve of the First World War, and having reverted to major upon relinquishing his previous assignment, he was promoted to the substantive rank of lieutenant colonel and became commanding officer (CO) of the 1st Battalion, Scots Guards, succeeding Colonel Frederick James Heyworth.

He remained in command until being wounded while leading the battalion in action on the Western Front in November 1914. He succeeded Brigadier General Charles FitzClarence in command of the 1st Division's 1st Guards Brigade, for which he was granted the temporary rank of brigadier general. Promoted to brevet colonel in February 1915, he then continued to command the brigade which was broken up in August, and in September he succeeded Major General Sir William Lambton as military secretary at the general headquarters (GHQ) of the British Expeditionary Force (BEF) in France. On 24 February 1916 he received the Légion d'honneur, class of Commandeur, and in the Birthday Honours of 1918 he was appointed Knight Commander of the Order of St Michael and St George.

Lowther was elected as Member of Parliament (MP) for Appleby at a by-election in 1915, but the constituency was abolished in 1918. In 1921 Lowther returned to Parliament as MP for Penrith and Cockermouth succeeding his brother James, who had held the seat since 1886 and been the Speaker since 1905, became Viscount Ullswater, but lost the seat in the 1922 general election to the Liberal Levi Collison. He did not attempt to return to politics.

He was elected a Fellow of the Royal Geographical Society on 11 November 1901. In 1912, he published From Pillar to Post, an account of his travels. In 1925, he co-authored The Scots Guards in the Great War, 1914–1918.

He died in Basingstoke, Hampshire aged 71.

== Family ==
He had married late, on 28 June 1920, to Dorothy Maude Isabel Harvey, a widow of Gordon Bois. There were no children.

Parliament of the United Kingdom
| Preceded by Lancelot Sanderson | Member of Parliament for Appleby; 1915–1918 | Constituency abolished |
| Preceded by James Lowther | Member of Parliament for Penrith and Cockermouth; 1921–1922 | Succeeded by Levi Collison |
