= Henry Howard (MP for Penrith) =

British politician

Henry Howard JP DL
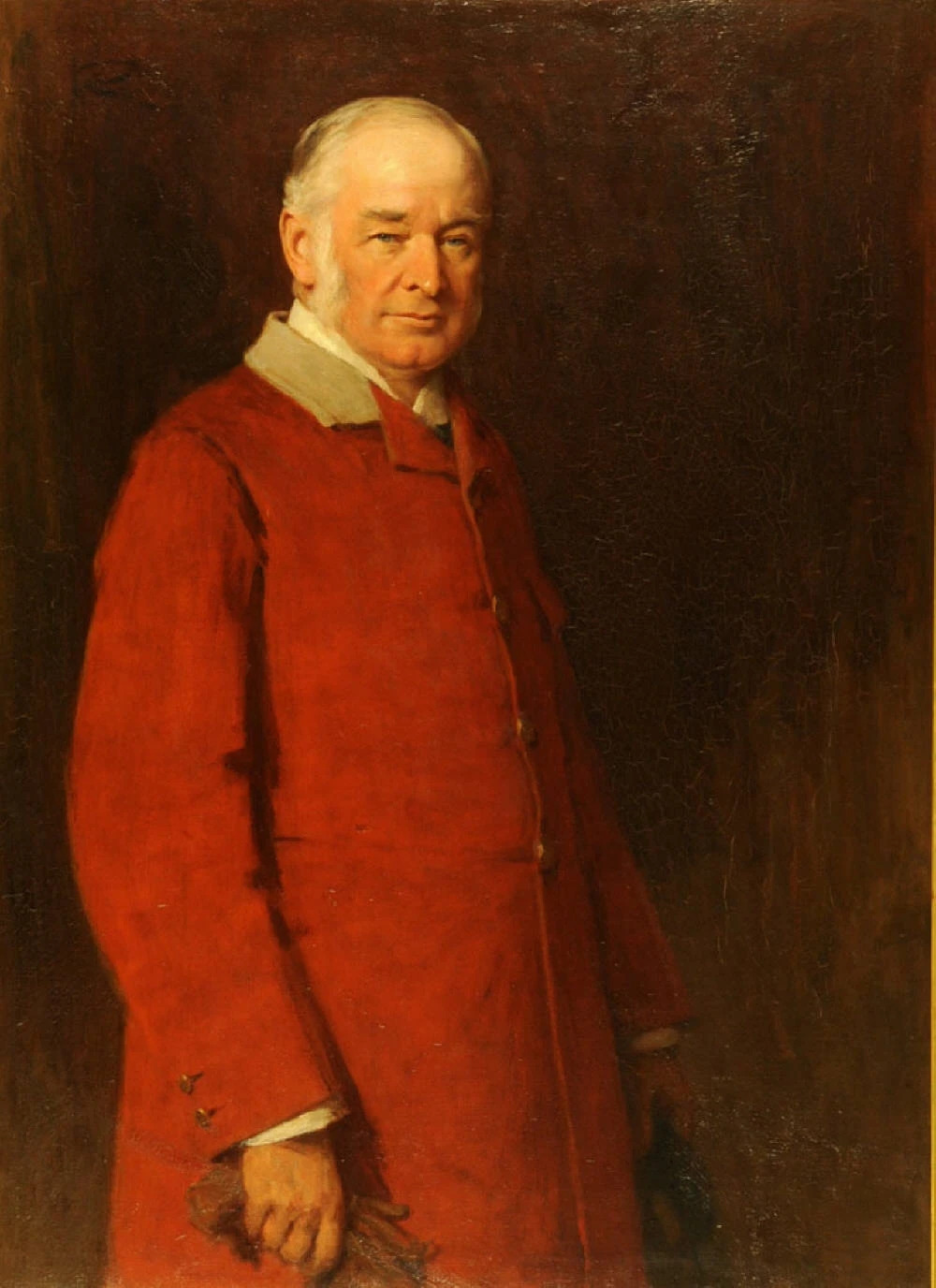
- Portrait by Sir George Reid, 1902

Member of Parliament for Penrith
- In office 18 December 1885 – 27 July 1886
- Preceded by: New constituency
- Succeeded by: James Lowther

Personal details
- Born: Henry Charles Howard; 17 September 1850 Greystoke Castle, Cumberland
- Died: 4 August 1914 (aged 63) Greystoke Castle, Cumberland
- Party: Liberal
- Spouse: Lady Mabel McDonnell (m. 1878–1914)
- Education: Harrow School
- Alma mater: Trinity College, Cambridge

Henry "Harry" Charles Howard JP DL (17 September 1850 – 4 August 1914) was an English Liberal politician and landowner in Cumbria, where he resided at Greystoke Castle. He was a member of the Howards of Greystoke, a Protestant branch of the aristocratic Howard family.

== Early life ==
Howard was born in 1850 at Greystoke Castle, the eldest son of politician Henry Howard (1802–1875), a son of Lord Henry Howard-Molyneux-Howard (younger brother of Bernard Howard, 12th Duke of Norfolk). His mother was Charlotte Caroline Georgina Long, daughter of Henry Lawes Long and Lady Catharine Walpole (daughter of the 2nd Earl of Orford).

He was a member of the prominent Howard family headed by the Duke of Norfolk, but within a Protestant branch descended from the 11th Duke, who had converted to Anglicanism in 1780.

Sir Stafford Howard, Robert Mowbray Howard, and Esmé Howard, 1st Baron Howard of Penrith were his younger brothers.

Greystoke Castle was largely destroyed by fire in 1868 and subsequently rebuilt by his father. After his father's death in 1875, he succeeded to his estates in Cumberland and Thornbury Castle, Gloucestershire.

He was educated at Harrow and Trinity College, Cambridge (B.A., 1874).

== Career and public life ==
Howard entered Parliament for Penrith in December 1885. Initially a Liberal, he disagreed with William Ewart Gladstone's support of Irish Home Rule and joined the Liberal Unionists to vote against it. He only held the seat until July the following year when he was defeated by Conservative James Lowther.

He left active politics for public work in Cumberland, though he maintained his connection with the Mid-Cumberland Liberal Association.

In 1891, he was elected chairman of the Cumberland County Council, a position he would hold until his death. He was also served as a Justice of the Peace for 38 years. He was Deputy Lieutenant both for Cumberland and Westmorland, and served as High Sheriff of Cumberland.

For many years he was involved with the Cockermouth, Keswick and Penrith Railway, serving as director, vice chairman, and chairman. In May 1907, he joined the board of directors of the Whitehaven Joint Stock Banking Co. (later incorporated with Parr's Bank and then NatWest Group).

As a major landholder, Howard was heavily involved in local agriculture, serving as president of the Penrith Farmers' Club and the Penrith Agricultural Society.

He was a Captain and Honorary Major of the Westmorland and Cumberland Yeomanry.

== Marriage and issue ==
Howard married Lady Mabel Harriet McDonnell, the second daughter of Mark McDonnell, 5th Earl of Antrim, in 1878. They had two children:

- Joan Mabel Howard (11 October 1879 – 13 December 1963), died unmarried
- Capt. Bernard Henry Esmé Howard MC (15 September 1880 – 5 October 1949), married Glory Evelyn Rollo, granddaughter of John Rollo, 10th Lord Rollo

Lady Mabel, who was appointed a CBE in 1920, died 31 December 1942.

== Death and legacy ==
After a cold turned into pneumonia, Howard died on 4 August 1914, at Greystoke Castle, aged 63. That same day, the United Kingdom declared war on Germany, formally entering the First World War; he died "happily unconscious of the terrible struggle upon which they had then just entered".

Following Howard's death, the Cumberland County Council organised a memorial fund to honour his lifetime of service to the county. The subscription raised £1,555 (equivalent to £138,000 in 2025, £1,200 of which was invested into the War Loan to endow a farm scholarship at Newton Rigg College, which he had helped found in 1896.

The remaining amount was used to fund a portrait of Howard for the county. Prominent copyist D. A. Vere Smith painted the portrait after an original by Sir George Reid (1902) in the collection of Greystoke Castle. The new portrait was unveiled by Lord Muncaster, Lord Lieutenant of Cumberland, in August 1915 at the Carlisle Courts, in a large ceremony attended by James Lowther, 1st Viscount Ullswater, Speaker of the House of Commons, who had unseated him in the 1886 election.

The Vere Smith portrait was acquired in 2010 by the Cumbria Archive Centre in Carlisle. It was unveiled again two years later in a ceremony honoring Howard at Newton Rigg College.

Parliament of the United Kingdom
| New constituency | Member of Parliament for Penrith; 1885–1886 | Succeeded by James Lowther |
