= Arthur Dixey =

British politician (1889–1954)

Arthur Carlyne Niven Dixey (1889 – 25 May 1954) was a British Member of Parliament.

Dixey was educated at Manchester Grammar School and became a solicitor in 1913. He was a supporter of the Conservative Party, and stood for the party in Penrith and Cockermouth at the 1923 United Kingdom general election. He won the seat, and served until the 1935 United Kingdom general election, when he stood down.

Parliament of the United Kingdom
Preceded by Levi Collison	Member of Parliament for Penrith and Cockermouth; 1923 – 1935	Succeeded by Alan Dower
