= The Leo Group =

Recycling company in England

The Leo Group is a privately owned, waste-recycling company based in Halifax, England that specialises in the collection and processing of animal by-products. The company is currently run by Daniel Sawrij, the managing director, who took over from the company's founders, his parents Margaret and Leo Sawrij, in 1988.

== History ==
The Leo Group was founded in the 1970s by Margaret and Leo Sawrij and was originally named Swalesmoor Mink Farm. The couple bought a 10-acre farm in Halifax in 1971 and began breeding minks and foxes for the fur industry. Following the prohibition of mink farming in the UK and the handover to Daniel Sawrij, the company turned its focus to selling maggots to fishing tackle shops, soon becoming the biggest producer of maggots supplying seven thousand gallons of maggots a week to Belgium, Germany, Italy, Netherlands and France At the same time, the company began mixing food for small pet food companies.

In 1993, Daniel Sawrij sold 90 percent of his beef cattle stock, injecting the funds into the maggot business. In the same year, he also renamed the company Leo Sawrij Ltd. in 1993 in memory of the founder.

In 1999, the company made their first acquisition of a rendering plant facility, which became Omega Protein Limited and was the start of the company's involvement in the rendering industry. The company also acquired two knacker businesses, creating Robinson Mitchell Limited, and began the collection of fallen stock.

In 2002, the company purchased a sister rendering plant, Alba Protein Limited. Alba has subsequently been liquidated, but not before it was at the centre of some controversy after the company was fined £350 for failing to ensure its lorry drivers had properly logged their hours.

In 2004 the company purchased NuPetra, and then a year later, Goodwill Fats & Proteins and Premier Pet Food in an effort to expand its own pet food business. In 2008, the company added the Kintore rendering plant in Aberdeenshire to its operations.

== Operations today ==
Although the company traditionally specialised in pet food, the Leo Group has expanded into renewable energy, through turning animals and food waste into biomass fuel to produce electricity. The majority of the company's fuel is used in power stations and cement works in and around Yorkshire as an alternative to coal. It also supplies a million litres of oil a week for biodiesel.

The Leo Group employs over 400 staff at six sites across the UK, including its head office in Halifax, a rendering plant in Bradford, and a site in Ingleton, North Yorkshire, which collects fallen stock from 7,000 farms across the north of England and Scotland. It also has a fuel store in South Yorkshire. It is planning to build a £4m anaerobic digester and has begun work on a 10MW biomass plant in Aberdeen.

In 2012, the company's profits reached £700m on £6.2b sales.

The company has been prosecuted a number of times for spillages, flouting planning rules and breaching environmental permit conditions, although the company has also been praised for the work it had done to benefit local residents of Halifax and Bradford who have complained about the noise and smells emanating from the company's factories.

== Controversies ==
- In July 2012, the Leo Group admitted breaching out-of-hours restrictions for lorries entering and leaving its rendering plant near Denholme. After lengthy court proceedings and an investigation, the firm had to pay £12 to Bradford Council as well as £15 to act as a bond against any future enforcement action by the council. The company admitted eight breaches of planning regulations and received eight formal cautions.
- In July 2011, Leo Group's Alba Transport admitted to breaking animal by-product laws after a total of eight offal spills from its lorries. The firm pleaded guilty to two offences and asked for six more to be taken into consideration. Magistrates in the city heard that cow intestines, chicken waste and blood had been shed from the firm's lorries and on one occasion part of the spill was nearly a foot thick.
- In February 2010, a worker at Alba Proteins Limited was killed in an accident involving a JCB machine, resulting in a lengthy police investigation.
- In August 2007, the firm was fined £20,000 after three employees were seriously injured whilst trying to clear a blockage from an industrial cooker. Due to the lack of training provided to the staff, the three employees triggered a pressurised steam explosion as they used various trial and error techniques to remove the blockage.
- In November 2004, the Leo Group was fined £24,000 after it admitted failures in ensuring the safety of its employees. The fine was enforced after the factory manager at Alba Proteins Limited's Wildriggs plant at Penrith had to have two toes amputated when a steel beam fell on his foot. In a separate incident, another worker fell from an unsafe scaffold tower on the same site.
