= Sunday Times Rich List 2013 =

Annual survey in the UK

The Sunday Times Rich List 2013 is the 25th annual survey of the wealthiest people resident in the United Kingdom, published by The Sunday Times on 21 April 2013.

The Guardian noted that "the annual rich list is dominated by Russian and Indian billionaires, with the highest ranking Briton being the Duke of Westminster, worth £7.8bn thanks to his property holdings in London's Mayfair and Belgravia and ranked eighth."

== Top 10 fortunes ==
2013		Name	Citizenship	Source of wealth	2012	
Rank	Net worth £ bn	Name	Citizenship	Source of wealth	Rank	Net worth £ bn
1 ▲	£13.30 ▲	Alisher Usmanov	Russia	Mining and investment	2	£12.32
2 ▲	£10.00 ▲	Leonard Blavatnik	United States	Industry	5	£7.58
3 ▲	£10.60 ▲	Sri and Gopi Hinduja	India	Industry and finance	4	£8.60
4 ▼	£10.00 ▼	Lakshmi Mittal and family	India	Steel	1	£12.70
5 ▼	£9.30 ▼	Roman Abramovich	Russia	Oil and industry	3	£9.50
6 ▲	£8.80 ▲	John Fredriksen and family	Cyprus	Shipping and oil services	9	£6.60
7 ▲	£8.28 ▲	David and Simon Reuben	United Kingdom	Property, metal trading and internet	8	£7.08
8 ▼	£7.80 ▲	Gerald Grosvenor, 6th Duke of Westminster	United Kingdom	Inheritance and property	7	£7.35
9 ▼	£7.40	Ernesto and Kirsty Bertarelli	Switzerland & United Kingdom	Pharmaceuticals	6	£7.40
10 ▲	£7.00 ▲	Charlene de Carvalho-Heineken and Michel Carvalho	Netherlands	Inheritance, banking, brewing (Heineken)	11	£5.49

== See also ==
- Forbes list of billionaires
