= Penrith and Cockermouth =

Parliamentary constituency in the United Kingdom, 1918–1950

- Former county constituency for the House of Commons

1918–1950
- Seats: one
- Created from: Cockermouth and Penrith
- Replaced by: Penrith and The Border and Workington

Penrith and Cockermouth was a parliamentary constituency centred on the towns of Penrith and Cockermouth in Cumberland, England. It was alternatively known as Mid Cumberland. It returned one Member of Parliament (MP) to the House of Commons of the Parliament of the United Kingdom, elected by the first past the post system.

== History ==
The constituency was created for the 1918 general election, and abolished for the 1950 general election.

== Boundaries ==
The Urban Districts of Cockermouth, Keswick, and Penrith, the Rural Districts of Alston with Garrigill, and Penrith, and part of the Rural District of Cockermouth.

== Members of Parliament ==
Election	Member	Party
1918	James Lowther	Speaker
1921	Cecil Lowther	Unionist
1922	Levi Collison	Liberal
1923	Arthur Dixey	Unionist
1935	Alan Dower	Conservative
1950	constituency abolished: see Penrith and The Border	

== Elections ==
=== Elections in the 1910s ===
General election 1918: Penrith & Cockermouth
Party	Candidate	Votes	%	±%
Speaker	James Lowther	Unopposed		
Speaker win (new seat)				

Lowther stood as a Unionist candidate, and received the Coalition Coupon

=== Elections in the 1920s ===
1921 Penrith and Cockermouth by-election
Party	Candidate	Votes	%	±%
Unionist	Cecil Lowther	7,678	50.1	N/A
Liberal	Levi Collison	7,647	49.9	N/A
Majority		31	0.2	N/A
Turnout		15,325	74.0	N/A
Unionist hold		Swing	N/A	

General election 1922: Penrith and Cockermouth
Party	Candidate	Votes	%	±%
Liberal	Levi Collison	9,114	51.1	N/A
Unionist	Cecil Lowther	8,736	48.9	N/A
Majority		378	2.2	N/A
Turnout		17,850	83.0	N/A
Liberal gain from Unionist		Swing	N/A	

General election 1923: Penrith and Cockermouth
Party	Candidate	Votes	%	±%
Unionist	Arthur Dixey	9,205	50.9	+2.0
Liberal	Levi Collison	8,878	49.1	−2.0
Majority		327	1.8	4.0
Turnout		18,083	83.2	+0.2
Unionist gain from Liberal		Swing	+2.0	

General election 1924: Penrith and Cockermouth
Party	Candidate	Votes	%	±%
Unionist	Arthur Dixey	11,431	67.9	+17.0
Labour	Fred Tait	5,404	32.1	New
Majority		6,027	35.8	+34.0
Turnout		16,835	75.9	+7.3
Unionist hold		Swing		

General election 1929: Penrith and Cockermouth
Party	Candidate	Votes	%	±%
Unionist	Arthur Dixey	10,595	45.2	−22.7
Liberal	Arthur Holgate	8,750	37.4	New
Labour	Archibald Dodd	4,073	17.4	−14.7
Majority		1,845	7.8	−28.0
Turnout		23,418	85.3	+9.4
Unionist hold		Swing		

=== Elections in the 1930s ===
General election 1931: Penrith & Cockermouth
Party	Candidate	Votes	%	±%
Conservative	Arthur Dixey	12,904	53.1	+7.9
Liberal	Arthur Holgate	11,412	46.9	+9.5
Majority		1,492	6.2	−1.6
Turnout		24,316	86.6	+1.3
Conservative hold		Swing		

General election 1935: Penrith & Cockermouth
Party	Candidate	Votes	%	±%
Conservative	Alan Dower	14,496	64.3	+10.2
Labour	Harold Smith	8,036	35.7	New
Majority		6,460	28.6	+22.4
Turnout		22,532	78.4	−8.2
Conservative hold		Swing		

General Election 1939–40:

Another General Election was required to take place before the end of 1940. The political parties had been making preparations for an election to take place and by the Autumn of 1939, the following candidates had been selected;

- Conservative: Alan Dower
- Liberal: William Jackson
- Labour: Harold Smith

=== Elections in the 1940s ===
General election 1945: Penrith & Cockermouth
Party	Candidate	Votes	%	±%
Conservative	Alan Dower	9,198	37.8	−26.5
Liberal	Noel Francis Newsome	6,579	27.0	New
Labour	Leonard Foster Browne	6,350	26.1	−9.6
National Independent	Tom Mitchell	2,204	9.1	New
Majority		2,619	10.8	−17.8
Turnout		24,331	79.3	+0.9
Conservative hold		Swing		

== Notes ==
Parliament of the United Kingdom
Preceded by Penrith	Constituency represented by the speaker 1918–1921	Succeeded by Halifax
