= Penrith (constituency) =

Parliamentary constituency in the United Kingdom, 1885–1918

- Former county constituency for the House of Commons

1885–1918
- Seats: one
- Created from: East Cumberland
- Replaced by: North Cumberland and Penrith and Cockermouth

Penrith was a parliamentary constituency centred on the town of Penrith in Cumberland, England. It returned one Member of Parliament (MP) to the House of Commons of the Parliament of the United Kingdom, elected by the first past the post system.

== History ==
The constituency was created by the Redistribution of Seats Act 1885 for the 1885 general election, and abolished for the 1918 general election.

== Members of Parliament ==
Year	Member	Party
1885	Henry Howard	Liberal
1886	Henry Howard	Liberal Unionist
1886	James Lowther	Conservative
1905	James Lowther	Speaker
1918	constituency abolished	

== Elections ==
=== Elections in the 1880s ===
General election 1885: Penrith
Party	Candidate	Votes	%	±%
Liberal	Henry Howard	3,921	53.2	
Conservative	James Lowther	3,448	46.8	
Majority		473	6.4	
Turnout		7,369	80.8	
Registered electors		9,123		
Liberal win (new seat)				

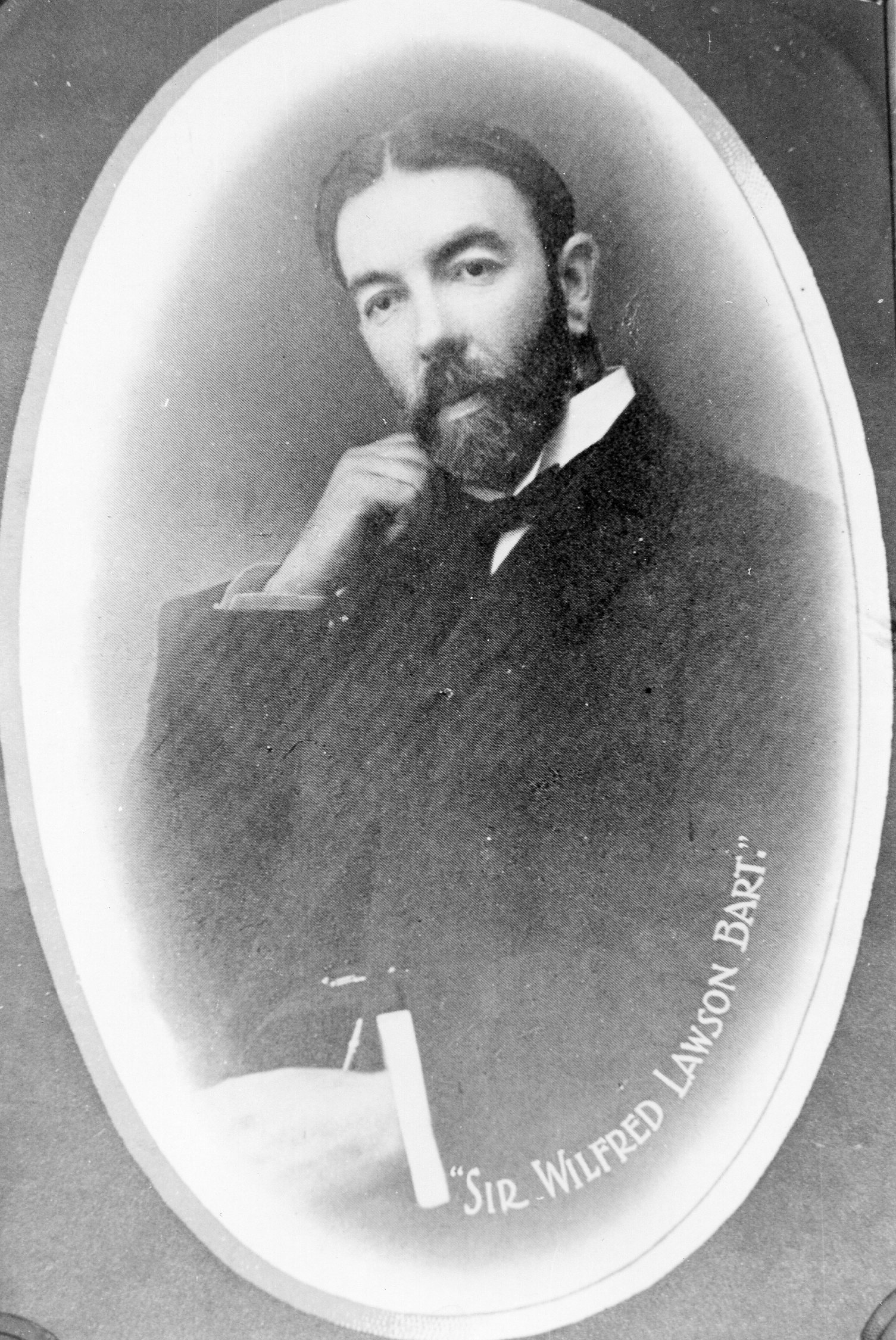
Lawson

General election 1886: Penrith
Party	Candidate	Votes	%	±%
Conservative	James Lowther	3,676	54.8	+8.0
Liberal	Wilfrid Lawson	3,032	45.2	−8.0
Majority		644	9.6	N/A
Turnout		6,708	73.5	−7.3
Registered electors		9,123		
Conservative gain from Liberal		Swing	+8.0	

=== Elections in the 1890s ===
General election 1892: Penrith
Party	Candidate	Votes	%	±%
Conservative	James Lowther	3,549	50.9	−3.9
Liberal	Thomas Sadler Douglas	3,424	49.1	+3.9
Majority		125	1.8	−7.8
Turnout		6,973	79.8	+6.3
Registered electors		8,733		
Conservative hold		Swing	−3.9	

General election 1895: Penrith
Party	Candidate	Votes	%	±%
Conservative	James Lowther	3,868	54.2	+3.3
Liberal	Thomas Sadler Douglas	3,268	45.8	−3.3
Majority		600	8.4	+6.6
Turnout		7,136	80.1	+0.3
Registered electors		8,914		
Conservative hold		Swing	+3.3	

=== Elections in the 1900s ===
General election 1900: Penrith
Party	Candidate	Votes	%	±%
Conservative	James Lowther	Unopposed		
Conservative hold				

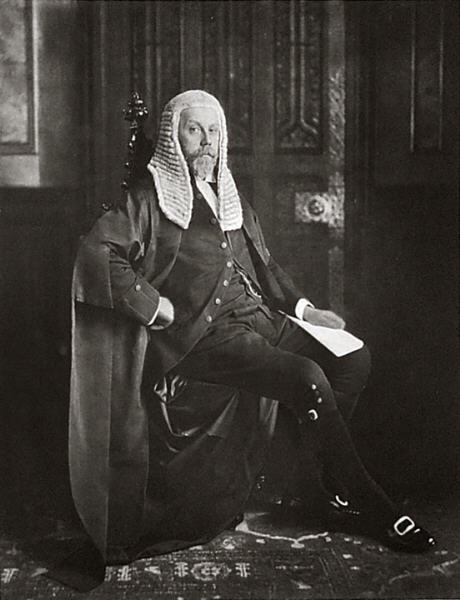
Lowther

General election 1906: Penrith
Party	Candidate	Votes	%	±%
Speaker	James Lowther	Unopposed		
Speaker hold				

=== Elections in the 1910s ===
General election January 1910: Penrith
Party	Candidate	Votes	%	±%
Speaker	James Lowther	Unopposed		
Speaker hold				

General election December 1910: Penrith
Party	Candidate	Votes	%	±%
Speaker	James Lowther	Unopposed		
Speaker hold				

Parliament of the United Kingdom
Preceded by Carlisle	Constituency represented by the speaker 1905–1918	Succeeded by Penrith and Cockermouth
