= James Lowther, 1st Viscount Ullswater =

British politician (1855–1949)

The Right Honourable The Viscount Ullswater GCB PC JP DL
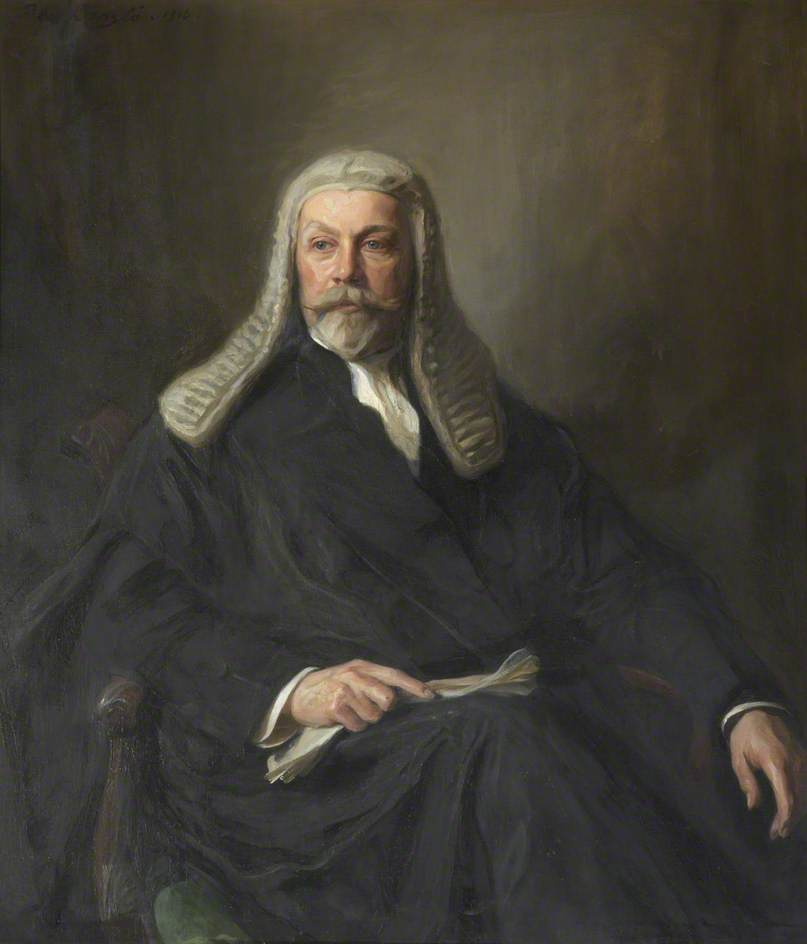
- Portrait by Philip de László, c. 1905

Speaker of the House of Commons of the United Kingdom
- In office 8 June 1905 – 28 April 1921
- Monarchs: Edward VII; George V
- Prime Minister: Arthur Balfour; Henry Campbell-Bannerman; H. H. Asquith; David Lloyd George
- Preceded by: Sir William Gully
- Succeeded by: J. H. Whitley

Deputy Speaker of the House of Commons Chairman of Ways and Means
- In office 1895 – June 1905
- Monarchs: Victoria; Edward VII
- Preceded by: John William Mellor
- Succeeded by: Sir John Lawson

Parliamentary Under-Secretary of State for Foreign Affairs
- In office 22 September 1891 – 18 August 1892
- Monarch: Victoria
- Prime Minister: The Marquess of Salisbury
- Preceded by: Sir James Fergusson
- Succeeded by: Sir Edward Grey

Member of the House of Lords Lord Temporal
- In office 8 July 1921 – 27 March 1949; Hereditary Peerage
- Preceded by: Peerage created
- Succeeded by: The 2nd Viscount Ullswater

Member of Parliament for Penrith and Cockermouth
- In office 14 December 1918 – 13 May 1921
- Preceded by: constituency established
- Succeeded by: Cecil Lowther

Member of Parliament for Penrith
- In office 27 July 1886 – 14 December 1918
- Preceded by: Henry Howard
- Succeeded by: constituency abolished

Member of Parliament for Rutland
- In office 1 September 1883 – 18 December 1885
- Preceded by: Gerard Noel
- Succeeded by: George Finch

Personal details
- Born: 1 April 1855
- Died: 27 March 1949 (aged 93)
- Party: Conservative
- Spouse: Mary Beresford-Hope (d. 1944)
- Education: King's College London; Trinity College, Cambridge

James William Lowther, 1st Viscount Ullswater, GCB, PC, JP, DL (1 April 1855 – 27 March 1949), was a British Conservative politician. He was Speaker of the House of Commons between 1905 and 1921. He was the longest-serving Speaker of the 20th century.

== Background and education ==
The son of Hon. William Lowther, a grandson of William Lowther, 1st Earl of Lonsdale, and for 25 years Member of Parliament for Westmorland, and Alice, 3rd daughter of James Parke, 1st Baron Wensleydale, Lowther was educated at Eton College, King's College London where he took an Associateship degree, and at Trinity College, Cambridge, where he studied classics and law. Lowther became a barrister in 1879, eventually becoming a Bencher of the Inner Temple in 1906.

== Political career ==
He was Member of Parliament for Rutland in 1883; contested Mid Cumberland in 1885; and sat for Penrith from 1886 to 1921. He was appointed 4th Charity Commissioner in 1887, and held junior ministerial office as Parliamentary Under-Secretary of State for Foreign Affairs from 1891 to 1892. He was Chairman of Ways and Means and Deputy Speaker from 1895 to 1905 and Speaker of the House of Commons from 1905 to 1921.

There are three golden rules for Parliamentary speakers: Stand up. Speak up. Shut up.

— J. W. Lowther, 1917

In April 1910, on the occasion of Lowther's birthday, the Times of India noted that while the previous speaker had been clean-shaven, Lowther had demonstrated 'that a bearded speaker can be quite as picturesque in appearance'.

== Other public appointments ==
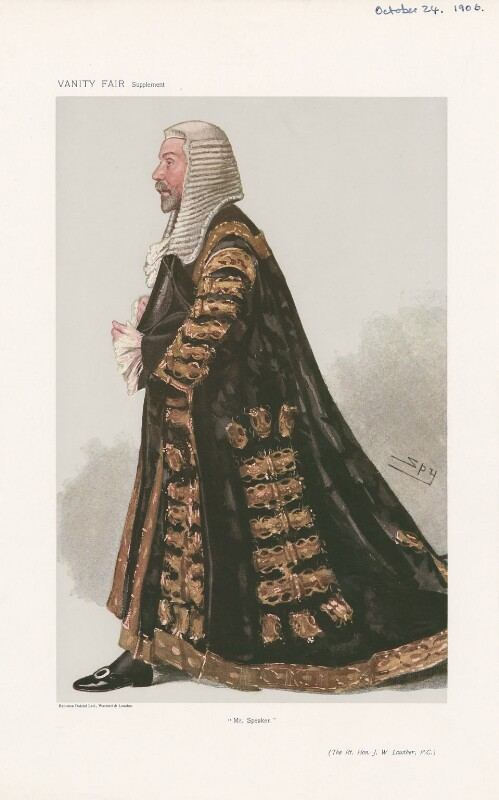
Lowther caricatured by Spy for Vanity Fair, 1906

Lowther represented the United Kingdom at the International Conference at Venice in 1892, and at the International Conference on Emigration at Rome in 1924. He was Chairman of the Speakers' Electoral Reform Conference in 1916–1917, of the Buckingham Palace Conference (on the partition of Ulster) in 1914, of the Boundary Commissions (Great Britain and Ireland) in 1917, of the Royal Commission on Proportional Representation in 1918, Devolution Conference in 1919, of the Royal Commission on London Government, 1921–1922; of Review Committee Political Honours, 1923–1924, and Statutory Commission on Cambridge University, 1923; of the Agricultural Wages Board from 1930 to 1940; of the Lords and Commons Committee on Electoral Reform, 1929–1930; and of BBC Enquiry Committee, 1935. He was a Trustee of the British Museum from 1922 to 1931 and a Trustee of the National Portrait Gallery from 1925. In 1907 his portrait was painted by Philip de László.

== Honours ==
He was appointed to the Privy Council in 1898, created 1st Viscount Ullswater, of Campsea Ashe, in the County of Suffolk, on his retirement as Speaker in 1921, and appointed a Knight Grand Cross of the Order of the Bath (GCB) in July 1921. He also held the degrees of DCL from the University of Oxford, LL.D from the University of Cambridge and DCL from the University of Leeds.

== Arms ==
Coat of arms of James Lowther, 1st Viscount Ullswater
Crest A dragon passant Argent. Escutcheon Or six annulets three two and one and in chief a crescent for difference all Sable. Supporters On either side a horse Argent gorged with a wreath of laurel Vert and charged on the shoulder with a portcullis chained Or. Motto Magistratum Indicat Virum (The Office Shows The Man)

== Family ==
On 1 March 1886, Lowther married Mary Frances Beresford-Hope (d. 16 May 1944). They had three children:

- Major Christopher William Lowther (18 January 1887 – 7 January 1935), the father of Lt. John Arthur Lowther and grandfather of Nicholas Lowther, the 2nd Viscount Ullswater.
- Arthur James Beresford Lowther (28 October 1888 – 2 March 1967)
- Mildred Lowther (1890 – 2 July 1973)

He was succeeded to the viscountcy by his great-grandson.

== Footnotes ==
Parliament of the United Kingdom
Preceded by Hon. Gerard Noel; George Finch	Member of Parliament for Rutland; 1883–1885; With: George Finch	Succeeded by George Finch
Preceded by Henry Howard	Member of Parliament for Penrith; 1886–1918	Constituency abolished
New constituency	Member of Parliament for Penrith and Cockermouth; 1918–1921	Succeeded by Sir Cecil Lowther
Political offices
Preceded by Sir James Fergusson, Bt	Under-Secretary of State for Foreign Affairs; 1891–1892	Succeeded by Sir Edward Grey, Bt
Preceded by John William Mellor	Chairman of Ways and Means; 1895–1905	Succeeded by John Grant Lawson
Preceded by William Gully	Speaker of the House of Commons of the United Kingdom; 1905–1921	Succeeded by John Henry Whitley
Honorary titles
Preceded by The Marquess of Crewe	Senior Privy Counsellor; 1945–1949	Succeeded by Winston Churchill
Peerage of the United Kingdom
New creation	Viscount Ullswater; 1921–1949	Succeeded by Nicholas Lowther
