= Lady Catharine Long =

English religious writer (1797-1867)

Lady Catharine Long (née Walpole; 5 November 1797 – 20 August 1867) was an English novelist and religious writer of the 19th century.

== Early life ==
Long was the seventh and youngest daughter of Hon. Horatio Walpole, and his first wife and cousin, Sophia Churchill. Her father's uncle was Prime Minister Robert Walpole. She was baptised 23 November 1797 at St James's Church, Piccadilly. Her father succeeded to the Earldom of Orford in 1809.

== Writing ==
Lady Catharine engaged in much literary work, chiefly in the way of religious fiction, and published some pieces of sacred music.

Lady Catharine's first work, Sir Roland Ashton, a Tale of the Times, was a religious novel directed against the tractarian movement. Stevens notes that Long reflected on contemporary concerns about the morality and aesthetics of the use of the novel form for religious subject-matter in her preface to the book, but notes that "Long's notion of novel writing being 'in God's hands' with the author as a kind of amanuensis, was one that was becoming increasingly familiar as the century wore on".

Heavenly Thoughts for Morning Hours (1851) Heavenly Thoughts for Evening Hours (1856) were her most notable religious works.

== Marriage and family ==
Lady Catharine married Henry Lawes Long of Hampton Lodge, Surrey, 22 July 1822. They had nine children, with eight surviving to adulthood:

- Charlotte Caroline Georgiana (23 April 1823 – 24 July 1896), married Henry Howard
- Catherine Beatrice (30 August 1824 – 10 October 1913), died unmarried
- Emma Sophia (20 February 1826 – 17 November 1896), married in 1855 Francis William Hastings, third son of Sir Charles Hastings, 1st Baronet
- Mary Elizabeth (23 October 1827 – 24 March 1902), married in 1861 William Eyre Matcham
- Sophia Horatia Churchill (9 February 1831 – 24 December 1905), married firstly Maj. Jervoise Clarke Jervoise, son of Sir Jervoise Clarke-Jervoise, 2nd Baronet; married secondly, in 1881, Edward King
- Isabella Henrietta Theodora (19 November 1831 – 29 January 1929), married 1859 Thomas Barnard, MP
- Edward Horatio (7 August 1837 – 20 April 1850), died young
- Henry Charles Dudley (1 June 1839 – 7 June 1870), died unmarried
- Florence Louisa Jane (15 September 1829 – 28 December 1919), married in 1855 Turner Arthur Macan

== Death ==
Lady Catharine died suddenly at her home, Landthorne Hatch, near Farnham, Surrey, from a heart attack in the early hours of 20 August 1867. Her death was attributed to "the severe shock to the system occasioned by the tempestuous weather which prevailed between one and two o'clock." Her husband and other family members were away in Belgium at the time, and she grew alarmed by an intense thunderstorm.

The local newspaper reported:

Her ladyship had attended a croquet party at Aldershot on Monday afternoon, and retired to rest in a state of apparent health and cheerfulness, but being somewhat alarmed at the terrific peals of thunder and vivid flashes of lightning, rang for her maid, who, being dressed, and in company of some of the other domestics in consequence of the terrible storm, was immediately in attendance. Her ladyship displayed considerably timidity, and sat for a time upon in the bedroom, interrogating the maid as to the weather and the fearfulness evinced by some of the other servants. Two unusual thunder claps followed in and her ladyship was observed to start suddenly dnd drop her head, The maid, alarmed, ran to another room for assistance, and on returning found her ladyship dead.

She was buried in St Lawrence church in Seale, Surrey, which contains several white marble monuments to members of the Long family, including her eldest son, Edward Horatio, and her husband's uncle Lt.-Gen. Robert Ballard Long.

== Works ==
Her works are:

1. Sir Roland Ashton, a Tale of the Times, London 1844, 8vo
2. Midsummer Souvenir, Thoughts Original and Selected, 1846, 32mo.
3. An Agnus Dei for four or five voices, 1848.
4. Christmas Souvenir, 1848, 32mo.
5. Heavenly Thoughts for Morning Hours, 1851, 18mo.
6. Heavenly Thoughts for Evening Hours, London, 1856, 18mo.
7. The Story of a Drop of Water, London, 1856.
8. First Lieutenant's Story, London, 1856, 12mo.
9. The Story of a Specific Prayer, London, 1863.
10. Herein is Joy, selections from Morning and Evening Thoughts.
11. He is not Dead, he cannot Die, in memory of Prince Albert, words and music.
12. For Wounds like these, Christ is the only Cure, set to music.
