= William Beauchamp =

William Beauchamp may refer to:

- William Beauchamp (academic administrator), American Roman Catholic priest and university administrator
- Will Beauchamp, Canadian filmmaker
- William Beauchamp, 1st Baron Bergavenny (1343–1411), English nobleman
- William Beauchamp (MP for Westmorland) (fl. 1405–1424), English politician
- William Beauchamp (MP for Worcestershire) (died c. 1421), English politician
- William Martin Beauchamp (1830–1925), American ethnologist and clergyman

== See also ==
- William de Beauchamp (disambiguation)
- Sir William Beauchamp-Proctor, 3rd Baronet (1781–1861), British naval officer
