= Warcop (disambiguation) =

Warcop is a village in Cumbria, England.

Warcop may also refer to:

- Thomas Warcop (disambiguation), various people
- Robert Warcop (died c.1439), MP for Westmorland (UK Parliament constituency)
