= 1913 Kendal by-election =

UK parliamentary by-election

The 1913 Kendal by-election was a Parliamentary by-election held on 18 March 1913. The constituency returned one Member of Parliament (MP) to the House of Commons of the United Kingdom, elected by the first past the post voting system.

== Vacancy ==
Josceline Bagot was twice returned as Conservative MP for Kendal (1892–1906 and 1910–1913), He died on 1 March 1913.

== Previous result ==
General election December 1910 Electorate 6,546
Party	Candidate	Votes	%	±%
Conservative	Josceline Bagot	3,041	52.7	−1.5
Liberal	William Somervell	2,733	47.3	+1.5
Majority		308	5.4	−3.0
Turnout		5,774	88.2	−2.8
Conservative hold		Swing	-1.5	

== Candidates ==
Somervell

John Weston was selected by the Unionists to defend the seat. The Liberals chose local man William Somervell who had stood here last time.

== Result ==
Kendal by-election, 1913 Electorate
Party	Candidate	Votes	%	±%
Ind. Unionist	John Weston	3,261	54.9	+2.2
Liberal	William Somervell	2,680	45.1	−2.2
Majority		581	9.8	+4.4
Turnout		5,941	90.4	+2.2
Ind. Unionist gain from Unionist		Swing	+2.2	

Somervell explained his defeat, and the doubling of the Unionist majority, by claiming that Weston (who stood as an Independent Unionist) had been elected because he was a ‘semi-Liberal’ and a popular local man.

== Aftermath ==
Somervell was to enter parliament at a by-election in May 1918, holding a Liberal seat. Following boundary changes, Kendal was merged into the new Westmorland seat for the 1918 elections.

General election 14 December 1918: Westmorland Electorate 30,516
Party	Candidate	Votes	%	±%
Unionist	*John Weston	Unopposed	N/A	N/A
Unionist win (new seat)				

- Weston was endorsed by the Coalition Government.
