= Hugh Salkeld =

Hugh Salkeld may refer to:

- Hugh Salkeld (died 1397/8), MP for Westmorland
- Hugh Salkeld (died c.1440), MP for Westmorland, son of above
