= Robert Sandford =

Robert Sandford may refer to:

- Robert Sandford (died 1459/1460), MP for Appleby in 1413 and Baron of the Exchequer, 1417–1418
- Robert Sandford (died 1403/1404), MP for Westmorland 1388
- Robert Sandford (1692–1777), MP for Boyle and Newcastle (Parliament of Ireland constituency)
- Robert Sandford (1722–1793), MP for Athy and Roscommon (Parliament of Ireland constituency)
- Robert Sandford (explorer) (1632– after 1668), explorer of the Province of Carolina and early colonist of Surinam
