= John Lancaster (died 1434) =

English politician (died 1434)

Sir John Lancaster (c. 1369 – 1434) was an English politician. He sat as MP for Westmorland in January 1397, 1406, Cumberland in March 1416 and Westmorland in December 1421.

He also served as Sheriff of Cumberland from 30 November 1416 till 10 November 1417, Justice of the Peace of Westmorland from 18 December 1405 till March 1411 and 2 July 1412 till June 1419. He served as collector of taxes in Westmorland in December 1407.

He was knighted by August 1401.

== Family ==
He was the son and heir of Sir William Lancaster (1345–1399) and Christine (died by March 1406). He was the brother of Robert Lancaster. By September 1398, he married Margaret (died before 1385), the daughter of Sir William Threlkeld and they had one son (who predeceased him) and four daughters. He married his second wife, Katherine (died after 1454) by November 1414.
