= Charles Brandon =

Charles Brandon may refer to:

- Charles Brandon, 1st Duke of Suffolk (c.1484–1545), close friend and brother-in-law of Henry VIII
- Charles Brandon, 3rd Duke of Suffolk (1537–1948), second son of the above and his fourth wife, Catherine Willoughby
- Charles Brandon (died 1551), MP, illegitimate son of 1st Duke of Suffolk
- Charles Brandon (The Tudors)

== See also ==
- Charlie Brandon (1943–2022), Canadian football player
