= James Grahme =

English army officer, politician and Jacobite

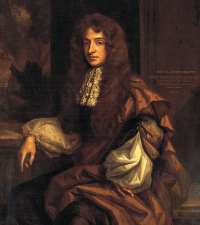
- Born: 1649; Norton Conyers, Yorkshire
- Died: 1730 (aged 80–81); Charlton Park, Wiltshire
- Education: Westminster School; Christ Church, Oxford
- Occupations: Army officer and politician
- Relatives: Richard Graham, 1st Viscount Preston (brother)

James Grahme (his own spelling) or Graham (1649–1730) was an English army officer, courtier and politician who sat in the English and British House of Commons between 1685 and 1727. After the Glorious Revolution he was involved for ten years in Jacobite schemes and plots.

== Early life ==
Grahme was born at Norton Conyers in Yorkshire in March 1649, the second son of Sir George Graham, bart., of Netherby, Cumberland, and his wife, Lady Mary Johnston, second daughter of James Johnstone, 1st Earl of Hartfell. He was educated under Richard Busby at Westminster School, and matriculated at Christ Church, Oxford on 16 July 1666, aged 16.

== Military man ==
Grahme received a commission from Louis XIV on 15 May 1671 to be captain of the regiment of Scottish infantry of Douglas. On 29 March 1673 he was appointed by Charles II to the captaincy of a company of foot commanded by the Earl of Carlisle, and on 15 November of the same year he became captain of a company of the royal regiment of English infantry, his commission bearing the signature of Louis.

On 1 February 1674 Grahme was promoted to the captaincy of twelve companies composing two battalions of the royal regiment of English infantry commanded by the Duke of Monmouth, but on 3 November that year, while in camp at Dettweiler, he obtained leave from Turenne to return to England. From Charles he received, on 1 January 1675, the captaincy of Sir Charles Littleton's company of foot, and on 30 October following a captaincy in the Earl of Craven's company of foot. On 23 February 1678 Grahme became lieutenant-colonel of the regiment of foot commanded by Lord Morpeth, and also the captaincy of a company.

== Courtier ==
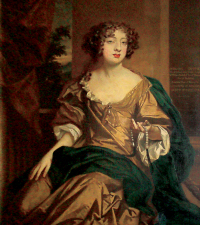
Dorothy Grahme, portrait by Peter Lely

Grahme's looks and manner made him a favourite at court. There he fell in love with Dorothy Howard, one of the maids of honour to the queen, and daughter of William Howard, fourth son of Thomas Howard, 1st Earl of Berkshire. After overcoming her mother's opposition, through the good offices of John Evelyn, Grahme was married to her at St. Martin's-in-the-Fields, London, by licence dated 22 November 1675. By December 1679 he was keeper of the privy purse to the Duchess of York, and soon after was acting in the same capacity to James, Duke of York, with apartments in St. James's Palace.

Under King James II, Grahme was made keeper of the privy purse and Master of the Buckhounds on 4 April 1685. He was also granted a lease of a lodge in Bagshot Park. On 28 November 1685, he became deputy-lieutenant of the castle and forest of Windsor. At the 1685 English general election, he was returned as Member of Parliament for Carlisle in James's only parliament, which was dissolved in 1687. In about 1687, he purchased the manor of Levens, near Kendal, Westmorland from Allan Bellingham .

== Jacobite loyalist ==
Grahme had the confidence of James II. At the Glorious Revolution he accompanied the king to Rochester on 18 December 1688, and lent him money. He secured on his return the royal plate in the "privy lodgings", and looked after James's shares in the East India and Guinea companies. He suffered financial penalties for selling those shares and "healing medals" for those who were touched for the king's evil.

Grahme also gained to some extent the good opinion of William III. Though fresh from a visit to James at St Germain, he was freely allowed to visit his brother Richard Graham, 1st Viscount Preston, who had been confined to the Tower of London on a charge of high treason in May 1689. William, however, refused to believe in his sincerity, when in July 1690 he offered, through Lord Nottingham, to take the oaths of allegiance. On 1 January 1691 his brother Lord Preston was seized when on his way to France with treasonable papers in his possession. A search was made for Grahme, and on 6 February 1691, a proclamation was issued against him. In May the attorney-general received orders to prosecute him "to the outlawry for high treason".

Grahme was pardoned by William III in February 1692, but he continued his visits to James II. He also began Jacobite agitation in Scotland, where his influence was considerable. The freedom of Edinburgh had been presented to him in 1679, and that of Stirling and Linlithgow in 1681. He visited Edinburgh to meet prominent Jacobites on 12 March 1692, and in the evening embarked from Leith for France in company with General Thomas Buchan and Brigadier Cannon. He narrowly escaped being arrested at his home in Norfolk Street, London, on 26 April, while superintending the removal of money and plate to be sent to James. Another proclamation was issued for his arrest on 10 May, and on 1 June he surrendered to the secretary of state, and was committed to the custody of a messenger. He was, however, allowed bail.

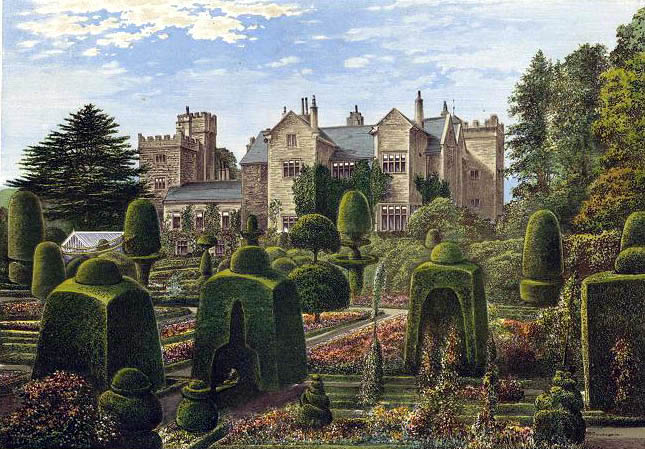
The garden at Levens Hall, c.1880

On 3 March 1696 Grahme was again arrested on the discovery of the assassination plot and sent to the Fleet Prison where he was visited on 6 April by Evelyn, but soon released. On the advice of his brother Fergus, who had fled the country, he settled quietly at Levens, though still maintaining correspondence with Jacobite friends. Bishop Thomas Ken was a frequent visitor at Levens. Monsieur Beaumont, the gardener of James II and the designer of the grounds at Hampton Court, was for many years in service at Levens. Its gardens were enlarged and laid out in the stiff topiary style then in fashion.

== After the death of James ==
Grahme's wife Dorothy died in 1700, and he married as his second wife, Elizabeth Bromley, widow of George Bromley of the Middle Temple, and daughter of Isaac Barton, merchant of All Hallows Barking, at St. Olave's, Hart Street, London, by licence dated 4 March 1702. In September 1701 Grahme took the oaths to the government, and at the 1702 English general election was elected MP for Appleby, Westmorland. He was returned unopposed there at the 1705 English general election. After the death of his eldest son, Henry (in 1707, he took over the representation of Westmorland at the 1708 British general election. His voting in 1710 in favour of Henry Sacheverell made him popular in Westmorland and Cumberland and he was returned again at the 1710 British general election. He was returned again in 1713, 1715, and 1722. At the 1727 general election he retired from public life.

In 1717 Grahme was elected mayor of Appleby by a large majority. In 1722 he was a deputy-lieutenant for Westmorland. For many years before his death Grahme had a house in Stratton Street, near Devonshire House, London. In the later part of his life he was often at Charlton Park, Wiltshire, the seat of his son-in-law Lord Berkshire. He died there on 26 January 1730, and was buried there on 2 February. His epitaph in the church describes him as "servant to King Charles and King James the Second" and "faithful to both".

Horace Walpole wrote that Grahme was a fashionable man in his day, and noted for his dry humour. The manuscripts at Levens Hall belonging to Josceline Fitzroy Bagot were described in the Historical Manuscripts Commission's 10th Report. Grahme seems to have destroyed all letters from his brother, Lord Preston, and from his close friend Lord Sunderland. He kept only two letters from James II.

== Family ==
By his first wife Dorothy Howard, Grahme had three sons and two daughters. Of the sons, Henry Graham was M.P. for Westmoreland, William (d. 1716) rose to be a captain in the navy, and Richard died prematurely in 1697 as a commoner of University College, Oxford. A series of letters from him and his tutor, Hugh Todd, describing his college life and last illness, was, with altered names of persons and places, published by Francis Edward Paget in 1875, with the title A Student Penitent of 1695. Grahme's eldest daughter, Catherine (d. 1762), was married on 8 March 1709 to her first cousin, Henry Bowes Howard, 4th Earl of Berkshire, who succeeded, in right of his wife, to the Levens estate; the youngest daughter, Mary, married John Michell of Richmond, Surrey, from whom she was separated, and lived until her death about 1718 with her father. He had no children by his second wife who died in September 1709.

== Notes ==
Attribution

This article incorporates text from a publication now in the public domain: Stephen, Leslie; Lee, Sidney, eds. (1890). "Graham, James (1649-1730)". Dictionary of National Biography. Vol. 22. London: Smith, Elder & Co.

Court offices
Preceded by Baptist May	Keeper of the Privy Purse; 1685–1689	Succeeded by William Bentinck, 1st Earl of Portland
Parliament of England
Preceded by Sir Christopher Musgrave, Bt; Edward Howard	Member of Parliament for Carlisle; 1685–1687; With: Sir Christopher Musgrave, Bt	Succeeded by Sir Christopher Musgrave, Bt; Jeremiah Bubb
Preceded by Wharton Dunch; Gervase Pierrepont	Member of Parliament for Appleby; 1702–1705; With: Gervase Pierrepont 1702-1705; William Harvey 1705-1708	Succeeded by Nicholas Lechmere; Edward Duncombe
Parliament of Great Britain
Preceded by Robert Lowther; Michael Fleming	Member of Parliament for Westmorland; 1708–1727; With: Daniel Wilson 1708-1722; Anthony Lowther 1722-1727	Succeeded by Anthony Lowther; Daniel Wilson
