= Sir Philip Musgrave, 6th Baronet =

British politician

Sir Philip Musgrave, 6th Baronet (c. 1712 – 5 July 1795) was a British politician.

He inherited his father's title in 1736. He was a Member of Parliament (MP) for Westmorland from 1741 to 1747, during which time he married Jane Turton from Orgreave, Staffordshire on 24 June 1742.

He inherited Kempton manor and park in Middlesex from the family of his mother Julia Chardin. She was the eldest daughter of Jean Chardin, a luminary Persia and Near East traveller and the Court Jeweller, whose son and sole heir John became a baronet but died childless in 1755 having bought the estate in 1741.

Notable issue:

- Henrietta Musgrave m. 1774 Sir John Morris, 1st Baronet, British industrialist, active in copper-smelting and coal-mining in Swansea, South Wales after which part of the settlement, Morriston became named.
- Sir John Chardin Musgrave, 7th Bt. (1757–1806)

David Barttelot gives a year of his living at his northern manor, Eden Hall, Edenhall, Cumberland as his north of England home: 1794, which was during the period from the reign of Henry VI of England until the early 1900s a Musgrave home. He died on 5 July 1795 at his manorial Middlesex estate Kempton Park (Kempton Manor House) which was sold by his son three years later to the Hounslow Heath gunpowder mills owner, Edmund Hill. Within a century Kempton Park Racecourse was set up in part of the grounds the remainder of which was non-arable woodland and pasture, much of which became the Kempton Park Reservoirs SSSI.

== See also ==
Musgrave baronets

Parliament of Great Britain
Preceded by Anthony Lowther; Daniel Wilson	Member of Parliament for Westmorland; 1741–1747; With: Daniel Wilson	Succeeded by Edward Wilson; John Dalston
Baronetage of England
Preceded by Christopher Musgrave	Baronet (of Hartley Castle); 1736–1795	Succeeded by John Musgrave
