= An Intelligent Person's Guide to Atheism =

Book by Daniel Harbour

- First edition
- Author: Daniel Harbour
- Language: English
- Genre: Non-fiction
- Publication date: 2001

An Intelligent Person's Guide to Atheism is the first book by Daniel Harbour, an Oxford maths and philosophy graduate, who at the time of writing was working for a PhD in linguistics at MIT.

== Synopsis ==
Rather than a history of atheism, as the title may suggest, the book is a guide to why (according to the author) atheism is superior to theism and why the (a)theist discussion is important. According to Harbour, atheism is "the plausible and probably correct belief that God does not exist", while theism is "the implausible and probably incorrect belief that God does exist", and anyone who cares about the truth should be an atheist. Harbour makes his case on the basis of two fundamental worldviews which he labels the Spartan Meritocracy and the Baroque Monarchy.

According to Harbour, Spartan Meritocracy makes minimal assumptions, that are subject to criticism and possible revision, when trying to explain the world - focusing more upon a proper method of inquiry than on reaching any particular or prejudicial conclusions. The Baroque Monarchy, however, relies upon elaborate dogmatic assumptions in the absence of any evidence—assumptions which are placed beyond question, critique or revision. Harbour compares these two opposing worldviews and argues that the Spartan Meritocracy is more plausible, more reasonable, and helps make the world a better place to live.

Harbour says that it is possible in theory for an atheist to adopt the Baroque Monarchy and for some types of theist to adopt the Spartan Meritocracy. He says that the Spartan Meritocracy is superior and anyone who cares about the truth should adopt this worldview. He also argues that it is highly unlikely for theism ever to occur within the Spartan Meritocracy due to the evidence the world presents, and that, consequently, anyone who adopts the Spartan Meritocracy will almost inevitably be an atheist.

== Reception ==
The book received largely mixed reviews. Reviewer Richard Sturch criticized the book's research practices and ideas, calling it a "careless and sloppy work", though praised it as "clearly and forcibly written". He concluded by calling it a poor defense of atheism. A reviewer from The Independent also called it a poor defense of atheism, though the reviewer did however say Harbour's approach to the topic was a fresh one in an otherwise stalled debate. The Contemporary Review praised it as entertaining, but said Harbour's arguments were overly dogmatic.
