= Thomas Sandford (disambiguation) =

Thomas Sandford was an American soldier and politician.

Thomas Sandford may also refer to:

- Thomas Sandford (MP) for Carlisle in 1597
- Thomas Sandford (MP for Westmorland), 14th-century MP and father of Robert Sandford (died 1403/1404)
- Sir Thomas Sandford, 1st Baronet (died c. 1655) of the Sandford baronets, elected to Cockermouth constituency
- Tommy Sandford, Northern Ireland politician
