= Thomas Taylour, Earl of Bective =

Anglo-Irish Conservative politician

Thomas Taylour, Earl of Bective (11 February 1844 – 15 December 1893), styled Lord Kenlis until 1870, was an Anglo-Irish Conservative politician.

Bective was the son of Thomas Taylour, 3rd Marquess of Headfort, by his first wife Amelia (née Thompson). Kenlis was educated at Eton and Christ Church, Oxford. He entered Parliament for Westmorland in 1871 (succeeding his father), a seat he held until 1885, when the constituency was abolished, and then represented Kendal until 1892. In 1884 he wrote to the Manchester-based Women's Suffrage Journal in support of the principle of women's suffrage, stating, "I think that (with certain limitations) women ought to be owners of the franchise. In fact, I think many women, especially freeholders and those who own a certain amount of property, are much more entitled to it than many men whom it is intended to enfranchise by the present Bill [passed into law as the Representation of the People Act 1884]."

Lord Bective married Lady Alice Maria, daughter of Arthur Hill, 4th Marquess of Downshire, in 1867. They had two daughters:

- Lady Olivia Caroline Amelia Taylour (22 January 1869 – 26 November 1939), married Lord Henry Cavendish Cavendish-Bentinck, half-brother of the 6th Duke of Portland, without issue
- Lady Evelyn Alice Estelle Taylour (10 February 1873 – 16 September 1875)

Bective served as High Sheriff of Westmorland in 1868. He died December 1893, aged 49, predeceasing his father by seven months. His half-brother Geoffrey later succeeded in the marquessate. The Countess of Bective died in 1928.

He was a Freemason, and served from 1886 as Grand Sovereign (head of the Order) of the Masonic and Military Order of the Red Cross of Constantine and the Appendant Orders of the Holy Sepulchre and of St John the Evangelist, which is a masonic order open only to trinitarian Christians. His brother Geoffrey, who succeeded to the marquessate, was also a Freemason.

== See also ==
- Marquess of Headfort

== Notes ==
Parliament of the United Kingdom
Preceded by The Earl of Bective; William Lowther	Member of Parliament for Westmorland; 1871–1885; With: William Lowther	Constituency abolished
Preceded by James Cropper	Member of Parliament for Kendal; 1885–1892	Succeeded by Josceline FitzRoy Bagot
