= Arthur Acland =

Arthur Acland may refer to:

- Sir Arthur Acland (died 1610) (1573–1610) of Acland, Landkey, Devon, knight
- Arthur Floyer-Acland (1885–1980), British soldier
- Sir Arthur Dyke Acland, 13th Baronet (1847–1926), Liberal politician and political author
- Geoffrey Acland (Arthur Geoffrey Dyke Acland, 1908–1964), Liberal politician
- Arthur Acland (MP), British Member of Parliament for Barnstaple
