= Dallam Tower =

Grade I listed country house in Cumbria, England

Coordinates: 54.2225°N 2.7830°W

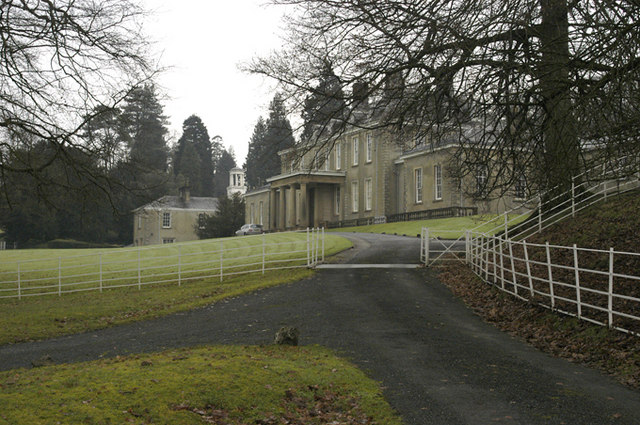
The driveway and front of Dallam Tower

Dallam Tower is a grade I listed country house in Beetham parish, near Milnthorpe, Westmorland and Furness, Cumbria, England. It is a member of the Historic Houses Association but is not open to the public except for occasional charity events, visits to the garden through the National Garden Scheme, and as a wedding venue.

The house is described as "Early C18 with C17 core, remodelled early C19" and has rainwater pipes dated 1722; its interiors include panelling by Gillow of Lancaster. It has a deer park of 190 acres (75 ha), running down to the River Bela beside the A6 road with a prominent grade II listed 18th-century deer shelter. The shelter was damaged by fire in April 2021. A public road and several public footpaths run through the deer park.

It has sometimes been erroneously referred to as Dallam Castle, and an earlier spelling was Dalham Tower. Before local government reorganisation in 1974 Dallam Tower was in the county of Westmorland.

== History ==
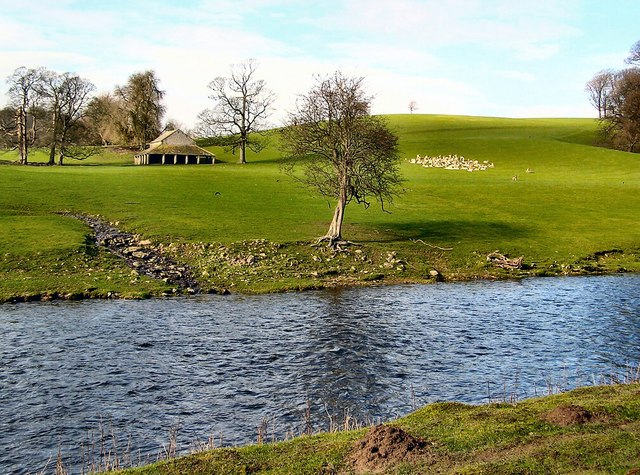
The Dallam Tower deer park with the River Bela and the listed deer shelter

A pele tower was built on the site in about 1375 but demolished when the present house was built in 1720–23. A plan dated 1614 indicates that at that time there was a house with formal gardens.

Notable residents included Daniel Wilson (1680 – 1754) and his son Edward Wilson (c. 1719–1764), who were both Members of Parliament for Westmorland.

== Ships ==
At least two ships have been named Dallam Tower, presumably in recognition of a connection with the house.

In 1823 the Lancaster Gazette reported that a brig called Dallam Tower had run aground and broken up en route from Dublin to Whitehaven. It is reported to have been built "about 1758, probably at Milnthorpe".

The Dallam Tower was built in 1866 in Birkenhead for the Lancaster Ship-owners Company, and launched by Mrs Wilson, wife of Mr G. E. Wilson of Dallam Tower. It was the third ship built for that company, and was intended for passenger traffic between Liverpool and Melbourne. In 1873 this ship reached Port Chalmers, New Zealand, after a dramatic voyage in which she had lost a mast and travelled 2,000 miles under a jury rig, and was the focus of much attention.

A Lancaster-registered ship named the Dallam Tower was wrecked off Java in March 1889 with a cargo of coal from Newcastle.

== See also ==
- Grade I listed buildings in Cumbria
- Listed buildings in Beetham
