= Anthony Lowther (died 1741) =

British politician

Anthony Lowther (aft. 1694 – 24 November 1741) was a British politician who sat in the House of Commons from 1721 to 1741.

Lowther was the third and youngest son of John Lowther, 1st Viscount Lonsdale and his wife Katherine Thynne, daughter of Sir Henry Frederick Thynne, 1st Baronet (ancestor of the Marquesses of Bath).

Reputed one of the handsomest men of his day, Lowther was first returned to Parliament for Cockermouth in a by-election on 21 July 1721 following the death of Lord Percy Seymour. This was arranged on the interest of the Lawsons of Isell. At the 1722 election, Sir Wilfrid Lawson took the Cockermouth seat himself, while Lowther was returned through his own family's interest for Westmorland.

In 1726 Lowther obtained a position as commissioner of the revenue for Ireland, which he resigned in 1734, apparently out of pique at not receiving any greater preferment. He was supposed to have had a hand in stoking the discontent of his elder brother, Viscount Lonsdale, which led the latter to resign as Lord Privy Seal in 1735. Lowther opposed the Convention of Pardo in 1739. He did not stand in the 1741 election in May and died that November, unmarried.

Parliament of Great Britain
Preceded by Thomas Pengelly; Lord Percy Seymour	Member of Parliament for Cockermouth; 1721–1722; With: Thomas Pengelly	Succeeded by Thomas Pengelly; Sir Wilfrid Lawson
Preceded by James Grahme; Daniel Wilson	Member of Parliament for Westmorland; 1722–1741; With: James Grahme 1722–1727; Daniel Wilson 1727–1741	Succeeded by Daniel Wilson; Sir Philip Musgrave
