= Kendal (constituency) =

Parliamentary constituency in the United Kingdom, 1832–1918

- Former borough constituency for the House of Commons

1832–1918
- Seats: one
- Created from: Westmorland
- Replaced by: Westmorland

Kendal was a parliamentary borough centred on the town of Kendal in Westmorland. It returned one Member of Parliament (MP) to the House of Commons of the Parliament of the United Kingdom, elected by the first past the post system.

== History ==
The constituency was created by the Reform Act 1832 for the 1832 general election, and abolished for the 1918 general election.

The small Kendal parliamentary borough constituency created in 1832 was abolished in 1885 by the Reform Act 1884. James Cropper, Liberal, being its last MP. The constituency after 1885 was a result of dividing the Westmorland constituency which up to then had two members since 1297. Thereafter it was the Kendal Division of Westmorland and the other being the Appleby Division. The two Conservative members for the old constituency William Lowther and the Earl of Bective were reelected in the 1885 general election, Mr Lowther for the Appleby Division and the Earl of Bective for the Kendal Division. These two constituencies were recombined under one member John Wakefield Weston for the 1918 general election.

== Members of Parliament ==
Election	Member	Party
1832	James Brougham	Whig
1834 by-election	John Foster-Barham	Whig
1837	George William Wood	Whig
1843 by-election	Henry Warburton	Radical
1847	George Glyn	Whig
1859	George Glyn	Liberal
1868	John Whitwell	Liberal
1880 by-election	James Cropper	Liberal
1885	Thomas Taylour	Conservative
1892	Josceline Bagot	Conservative
1906	Dudley Stewart-Smith	Liberal
January 1910	Josceline Bagot	Conservative
1913 by-election	John Weston	Conservative
1918	constituency abolished	

== Elections ==
Decades:	1830s; 1840s; 1850s; 1860s; 1870s; 1880s; 1890s; 1900s; 1910s

=== Elections in the 1830s ===
General election 1832: Kendal
Party	Candidate	Votes	%
Whig	James Brougham	Unopposed	
Registered electors		327	
Whig win (new seat)			

Brougham's death caused a by-election.

By-election, 17 February 1834: Kendal
Party	Candidate	Votes	%
Whig	John Barham	Unopposed	
Whig hold			

General election 1835: Kendal
Party	Candidate	Votes	%
Whig	John Barham	Unopposed	
Registered electors		344	
Whig hold			

General election 1837: Kendal
Party	Candidate	Votes	%
Whig	George William Wood	Unopposed	
Registered electors		321	
Whig hold			

=== Elections in the 1840s ===
General election 1841: Kendal
Party	Candidate	Votes	%	±%
Whig	George William Wood	Unopposed		
Registered electors		353		
Whig hold				

Wood's death caused a by-election.

By-election, 9 November 1843: Kendal
Party	Candidate	Votes	%	±%
Radical	Henry Warburton	182	60.5	N/A
Conservative	George Bentinck	119	39.5	New
Majority		63	21.0	N/A
Turnout		301	81.8	N/A
Registered electors		368		
Radical gain from Whig		Swing	N/A	

General election 1847: Kendal
Party	Candidate	Votes	%	±%
Whig	George Glyn	Unopposed		
Registered electors		397		
Whig hold				

=== Elections in the 1850s ===
General election 1852: Kendal
Party	Candidate	Votes	%	±%
Whig	George Glyn	Unopposed		
Registered electors		382		
Whig hold				

General election 1857: Kendal
Party	Candidate	Votes	%	±%
Whig	George Glyn	Unopposed		
Registered electors		402		
Whig hold				

General election 1859: Kendal
Party	Candidate	Votes	%	±%
Liberal	George Glyn	Unopposed		
Registered electors		432		
Liberal hold				

=== Elections in the 1860s ===
General election 1865: Kendal
Party	Candidate	Votes	%	±%
Liberal	George Glyn	Unopposed		
Registered electors		439		
Liberal hold				

General election 1868: Kendal
Party	Candidate	Votes	%	±%
Liberal	John Whitwell	Unopposed		
Registered electors		1,884		
Liberal hold				

=== Elections in the 1870s ===
General election 1874: Kendal
Party	Candidate	Votes	%	±%
Liberal	John Whitwell	1,061	69.3	N/A
Conservative	William Allen Francis Saunders	470	30.7	New
Majority		591	38.6	N/A
Turnout		1,531	82.4	N/A
Registered electors		1,859		
Liberal hold		Swing	N/A	

=== Elections in the 1880s ===
General election 1880: Kendal
Party	Candidate	Votes	%	±%
Liberal	John Whitwell	1,118	67.4	−1.9
Conservative	Alfred Harris	541	32.6	+1.9
Majority		577	34.8	−3.8
Turnout		1,659	86.5	+4.1
Registered electors		1,917		
Liberal hold		Swing	−1.9	

Whitwell's death caused a by-election.

By-election, 17 Dec 1880: Kendal
Party	Candidate	Votes	%	±%
Liberal	James Cropper	953	59.3	−8.1
Conservative	Alfred Harris	653	40.7	+8.1
Majority		300	18.7	−16.1
Turnout		1,606	83.8	−2.7
Registered electors		1,917		
Liberal hold		Swing	−8.1	

General election 1885: Kendal
Party	Candidate	Votes	%	±%
Conservative	Thomas Taylour	2,690	52.6	+20.0
Liberal	James Cropper	2,427	47.4	−20.0
Majority		263	5.2	N/A
Turnout		5,117	90.9	+4.4
Registered electors		5,630		
Conservative gain from Liberal		Swing	+20.0	

General election 1886: Kendal
Party	Candidate	Votes	%	±%
Conservative	Thomas Taylour	Unopposed		
Conservative hold				

=== Elections in the 1890s ===
Josceline Bagot

General election 1892: Kendal
Party	Candidate	Votes	%	±%
Conservative	Josceline Bagot	2,838	56.2	N/A
Liberal	James Anson Farrer	2,209	43.8	New
Majority		629	12.4	N/A
Turnout		5,047	84.1	N/A
Registered electors		6,000		
Conservative hold		Swing	N/A	

General election 1895: Kendal
Party	Candidate	Votes	%	±%
Conservative	Josceline Bagot	2,771	57.5	+1.3
Liberal	Herbert Stephenson	2,049	42.8	−1.0
Majority		722	15.0	+2.6
Turnout		4,820	79.1	−5.0
Registered electors		6,095		
Conservative hold		Swing	+1.3	

=== Elections in the 1900s ===
General election 1900: Kendal
Party	Candidate	Votes	%	±%
Conservative	Josceline Bagot	Unopposed		
Conservative hold				

Stewart-Smith

General election 1906: Kendal
Party	Candidate	Votes	%	±%
Liberal	Dudley Stewart-Smith	2,899	52.3	New
Conservative	Josceline Bagot	2,647	47.7	N/A
Majority		252	4.6	N/A
Turnout		5,546	85.6	N/A
Registered electors		6,477		
Liberal gain from Conservative		Swing	N/A	

=== Elections in the 1910s ===
General election January 1910: Kendal
Party	Candidate	Votes	%	±%
Conservative	Josceline Bagot	3,228	54.2	+6.5
Liberal	Dudley Stewart-Smith	2,726	45.8	−6.5
Majority		502	8.4	N/A
Turnout		5,954	91.0	+5.4
Registered electors		6,546		
Conservative gain from Liberal		Swing	+6.5	

Somervell

General election December 1910: Kendal
Party	Candidate	Votes	%	±%
Conservative	Josceline Bagot	3,041	52.7	−1.5
Liberal	William Somervell	2,733	47.3	+1.5
Majority		308	5.4	−3.0
Turnout		5,774	88.2	−2.8
Registered electors		6,546		
Conservative hold		Swing	−1.5	

1913 Kendal by-election
Party	Candidate	Votes	%	±%
Ind. Unionist	John Weston	3,261	54.9	New
Liberal	William Somervell	2,680	45.1	−2.2
Majority		581	9.8	N/A
Turnout		5,941	90.4	+2.2
Registered electors		6,575		
Ind. Unionist gain from Conservative		Swing	+2.2	

General Election 1914–15:

Another General Election was required to take place before the end of 1915. The political parties had been making preparations for an election to take place and by July 1914, the following candidates had been selected;

- Unionist: John Weston
- Liberal: William Somervell
