= Robert Lancaster (MP) =

English politician

Robert Lancaster (fl. 1416 – 1436) was an English politician who sat as MP for Carlisle in March 1416.

He was the younger son of Sir William Lancaster (1345–1399) and Christine (died by March 1406). He was the younger brother of John Lancaster. He married and had one son, William.
