= James Brougham =

British politician

James Brougham (16 January 1780 – 22 December 1833) was a British Whig politician.

== Background ==
Brougham was the second son of Henry Brougham and his wife Eleanor. She was the daughter of James Syme and the niece of William Robertson. His older brother was Henry Brougham, 1st Baron Brougham and Vaux, who served as Lord Chancellor, and one of his younger brothers was William Brougham, 2nd Baron Brougham and Vaux, who sat also in the Parliament of the United Kingdom as well as succeeded in the barony.

== Career ==
Brougham entered the British House of Commons in 1826, having been elected for Tregony. He represented the constituency until 1830 and sat then for Downton in the following year. In 1831, he was returned for Winchelsea. After a year the constituency was abolished and Brougham stood successfully for Kendal, which had been established by the Reform Act 1832. In the same year his brother Henry made him Registrar of Affidavits as well as Clerk of Letters Patent. Both offices were provided with a high salary and were executed by deputies. Brougham died in the next year at Brougham Hall, unmarried and childless, aged 53. His burial took place in Skelton, Cumbria and was only attended by his brothers.

== Notes ==
Parliament of the United Kingdom
Preceded by James O'Callaghan; Viscount Barnard	Member of Parliament for Tregony; 1826–1830; With: Stephen Lushington	Succeeded by James Adam Gordon; James Mackillop
Preceded by Bartholomew Bouverie; Alexander Powell	Member of Parliament for Downton; 1830–1831; With: Charles Shaw-Lefevre 1830–1831; Thomas Creevey 1831	Succeeded by Thomas Creevey; Philip Pleydell Bouverie
Preceded by John Williams; Stephen Lushington	Member of Parliament for Winchelsea; 1831–1832; With: John Williams	Constituency abolished
New constituency	Member of Parliament for Kendal; 1832–1833	Succeeded by John Foster-Barham
