= Chardin baronets =

Title in Great Britain

Escutcheon of the Chardin baronets of the Inner Temple

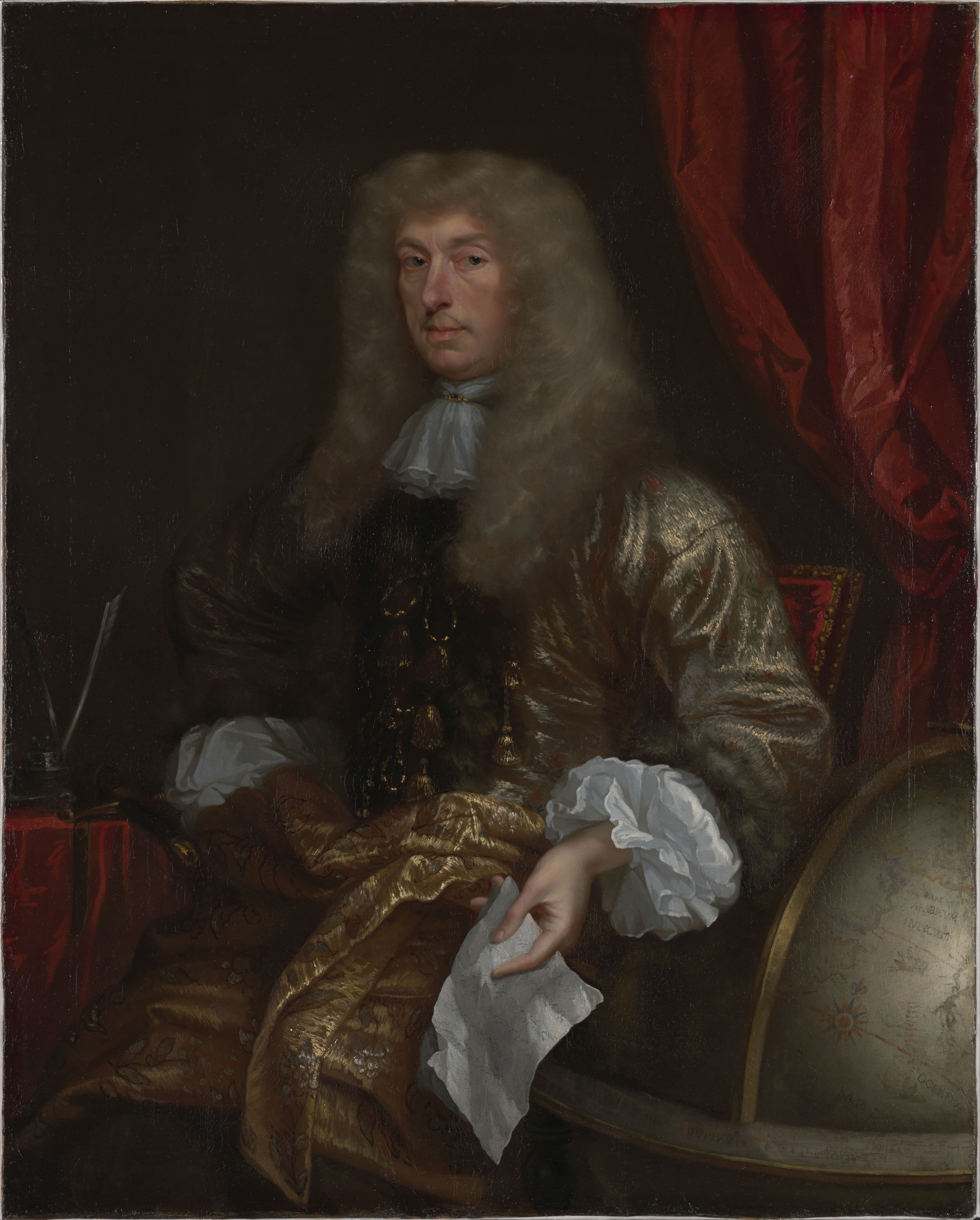
Sir John Chardin, father of the first Baronet

The Chardin baronetcy, of the Inner Temple in London, was a title in the Baronetage of Great Britain. It was created on 28 May 1720 for John Chardin, son of the noted French-born jeweller and traveller Sir John Chardin.

Before 1741 Chardin bought Kempton Park, Middlesex. He never married and the title became extinct on his death in 1755, his eldest sister's husband, Sir Philip Musgrave, 6th Baronet, inheriting most of his probate assets.

== Chardin baronets, of the Inner Temple (1720) ==
- Sir John Chardin, 1st Baronet (1687–1755)

Baronetage of Great Britain
New creation	Baronet (of the Inner Temple); 1720–1755	Extinct
Preceded by Fellowes baronets	Chardin baronets of the Inner Temple; 28 May 1720	Succeeded by Blunt baronets
