= 1871 Westmorland by-election =

UK Parliamentary by-election

The 1871 Westmorland by-election was fought on 21 February 1871. The by-election was fought due to the incumbent Conservative MP, Thomas Taylor becoming Baron Kenlis and so losing his House of Commons seat due to his elevation to the House of Lords. It was won by his son Thomas Taylor, who stood unopposed as the Conservative candidate.
