= Sir John Weston, 1st Baronet =

British politician (1852–1926)

Colonel Sir John Wakefield Weston, 1st Baronet (13 June 1852 – 19 September 1926) was a British soldier and Conservative Party politician.

Weston sat as the Member of Parliament (MP) for Kendal between 1913 and 1918. When the constituency was abolished, he sat as the member for Westmorland between 1918 and 1924. In the 1926 Birthday Honours he was created a baronet, of Kendal in the County of Westmorland.

Weston died in September 1926, aged 71, when the baronetcy became extinct.

Parliament of the United Kingdom
Preceded by Josceline Bagot	Member of Parliament for Kendal; 1913–1918	Constituency abolished
New constituency	Member of Parliament for Westmorland; 1918–1924	Succeeded by Hon. Oliver Stanley
Baronetage of the United Kingdom
New creation	Baronet (of Kendal); 1926	Extinct
