= Robert Lowther (colonial administrator) =

English landowner

Robert Lowther (13 December 1681 – September 1745) was an English landowner and colonial governor. He was the eldest son of Richard Lowther and Barbara Prickett. He held the estate of Maulds Meaburn in Westmorland.

Lowther owned the Christchurch Plantation, a slave plantation in Barbados, having acquired it as a result of marrying one Joanna (or Joan) Frere in 1709. He was her fourth husband, the previous one being Robert Carleton of Carleton Hall, Penrith. The marriage to Joan probably had a financial motivation to it as Lowther was in a difficult situation, with only a relatively small income from the Meaburn estate. The income from the Barbados plantation came from the sale of rum, farm produce and farm animals as well as from sugar. This income was supplemented by the annual salary he received during the eight years of his Governorship of the island of Barbados.

From 1711 to 1714 and 1715 to 1720, he served as Governor of Barbados. During his first stint as Governor, Lowther reported back to London that the Island's state of affairs was very bad. Complaints against him led to his recall in February 1714, but the death of Queen Anne in that year and the subsequent change of administration meant that there was no follow-up and he was re-appointed to the post.

The Privy Council met in Whitehall to hear several complaints against Lowther on 4, 5, 12, 18 and 25 October 1720. The charges referred to maladministration and embezzlement. At their meeting on the 25th the Council ordered a warrant to be issued for Lowther's arrest for 'Crimes and Misdemeanours Committed by him in the said Island, which were fully proved before Their Excellencies in the council, and several other Complaints having been made to this Board against him, Their Excellencies Judged it incumbent on them to take care that Crimes so Heinous should not Escape the punishment due to them by Law'. It is unclear whether Lowther was investigating corruption on the Island and therefore attracted vitriol and charges against him, or whether he himself was corrupt (or both). Lowther was cleared of the charges, but he never returned to Barbados. He certainly did well out of his Barbadian connection: he cleared his debts, bought property, lent money and died a wealthy man worth "upwards of £60,000".

Lowther's wife, Joan, died in 1722, and they had no heirs. On 22 June 1731, aged 49, he married his cousin Katherine Pennington, daughter of Sir Joseph Pennington, 2nd Baronet. They had five children:

- James Lowther, 1st Earl of Lonsdale (1736–1802)
- Margaret Lowther (1728 – 10 September 1800), married on 19 March 1757 Henry Vane, 2nd Earl of Darlington
- Katherine Lowther (d. 21 March 1809), married on 8 April 1765 Harry Powlett, 6th Duke of Bolton
- Robert Lowther (1741–1777)
- Barbara Lowther, died unmarried

Robert Lowther died in 1745 having spent most of his later years in London, although his wife may have spent some time in Cumbria.

Parliament of England
Preceded by Henry Graham; William Fleming	Member of Parliament for Westmorland; 1705–1707; With: Henry Graham	Succeeded by Parliament of Great Britain
Parliament of Great Britain
Preceded by Parliament of England	Member of Parliament for Westmorland; 1705–1708; With: Michael Fleming 1707–1708	Succeeded by James Grahme; Daniel Wilson
Military offices
Preceded by James Lowther	Storekeeper of the Ordnance; 1708–1710	Succeeded by Edward Ashe
Political offices
Preceded by George Lillington acting	Governor of Barbados; 1711–1714	Succeeded by William Sharpe acting
Preceded by governor acting	Governor of Barbados; 1715–1720	Succeeded by John Frere acting
