= Dudley Stewart-Smith =

British Liberal politician and barrister

Stewart-Smith

Sir Dudley Stewart-Smith KC (3 February 1857 – 9 May 1919) was a British Liberal Party politician and barrister.

== Background ==
He was born in Paddington, London, the son of Alexander Stewart-Smith and Susannah Laming. After his father's death in Hong Kong in 1859, his mother remarried to grocer Worthington Evans; Laming Worthington-Evans was his half-brother. He was educated at University College London. He obtained an LLB at London University. He married Katherine Cautley of Burton Pidsea. They had two sons and three daughters. A son, Dudley Cautley Stewart-Smith was born in 1894

== Career ==
Stewart-Smith received a call to the bar in 1886, and was made a Bencher at Middle Temple. He was appointed a King's Council in April 1902. He was Chairman of the Lancaster Quarter Sessions (Salford Hundred). He was on the Council of the Victoria and Liverpool Universities. He was a royal commissioner (Land Transfer). He was a justice of the peace in Westmorland, Lancashire, and Cheshire. He sat as Liberal MP for the Kendal Division of Westmorland from 1906 to 1910. He gained the seat from the Conservatives at the 1906 General Election, winning at his first attempt. He lost his seat back to the Conservatives at the general election of January 1910. He contested Nottingham East, in December 1910 without success and did not stand for parliament again. He was appointed Vice-Chancellor of the County Palatine of Lancaster in 1912. He was knighted in the 1917 Birthday Honours. He published Law of Winding-up and Reconstruction of Joint-Stock Companies.

Parliament of the United Kingdom
Preceded by Josceline Bagot	Member of Parliament for Kendal; 1906–January 1910	Succeeded by Josceline Bagot
