= Thomas de Betham =

English politician

Thomas de Betham (fl. 1302–1312) was an English politician.

He was a member (MP) of the parliament of England for Lancashire in 1311 and for Westmorland in 1302, 1308–1309 and 1311–1312.
