= Thomas Warcop =

Thomas Warcop may refer to:

- Thomas Warcop, executed with William Andleby
- Thomas Warcop (died c.1423), MP for Appleby (UK Parliament constituency) and Westmorland
- Thomas Warcop (fl.1414), MP for Westmorland (UK Parliament constituency)
- Thomas Warcop (fl.1415), MP for Westmorland (UK Parliament constituency)
- Thomas Warcop (1525 - 1589), MP for Westmorland (UK Parliament constituency) 1547
