= Edward Wilson (MP) =

Edward Wilson (c. 1719–1764) of Dallam Tower was member of the Parliament of Great Britain for Westmorland from 1747 to 1754, being returned unopposed, and was an unsuccessful candidate for the same seat in 1761. He succeeded his father Daniel Wilson (1680–1754) in the seat.

Parliament of Great Britain
Preceded by Sir Philip Musgrave; Daniel Wilson	Member of Parliament for Westmorland; 1747–1754; With: John Dalston	Succeeded by Sir George Dalston; John Dalston
