= Theodosia Bagot =

British nurse (1865-1940)

Theodosia Bagot, Lady Bagot RRC
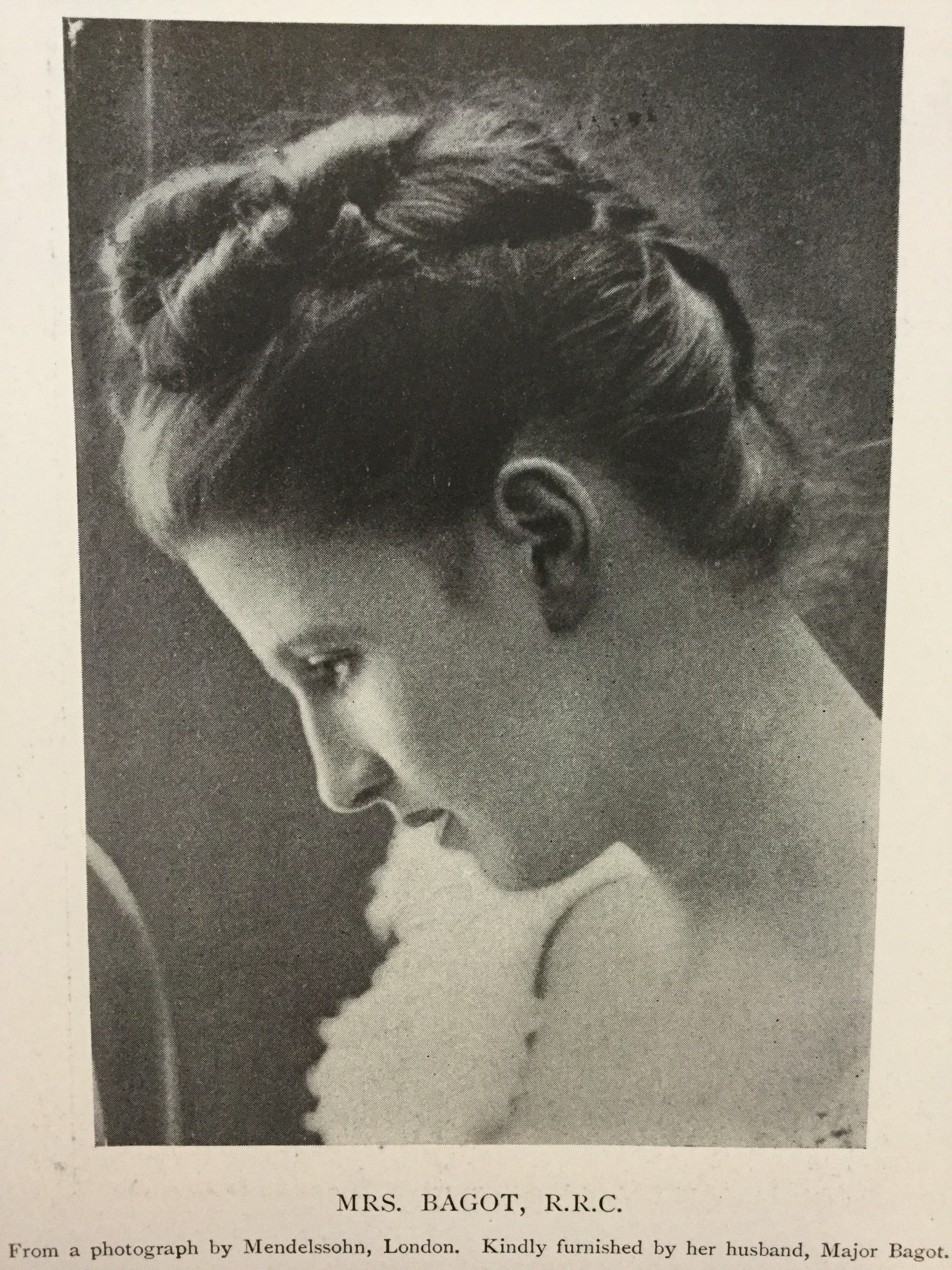
- Portrait of Bagot c. 1903
- Born: 5 January 1865
- Died: 21 February 1940 (aged 75)
- Occupations: Benefactor, nurse and author
- Notable work: Shadows of the War (1901)
- Spouse(s): Charles Bagot (m. 1885; died 1913) Sidney Bellingham Swann (m. 1920)
- Children: 4

Theodosia Bagot, Lady Bagot, RRC (née Leslie; 5 January 1865 – 21 February 1940) was a British nurse, benefactor and author. She founded and served in field hospitals during the Second Boer War, the First Balkan War, and the First World War, for which she was awarded a number of British and foreign decorations. A devout Christian, she was active in the Anglican Church Army.

== Biography ==
Theodosia Leslie was born on 5 January 1865. She was the daughter of Sir John Leslie, 1st Baronet and Lady Constance Dawson-Damer, daughter of George Dawson-Damer. She founded the Portland Hospital and accompanied it to South Africa during the Boer War, for which she was awarded the Royal Red Cross (RRC). She had little nursing experience herself, but learnt on the job during her time in South Africa and became particularly skilled on the surgical wards. In 1901, her book Shadows of the War, a narrative of experiences and impressions of the war, was published. In 1900, she was mentioned in despatches by Lord Roberts in relation to service during the Second Boer War. She was appointed a Lady of Grace of the Venerable Order of Saint John (DStJ) in July 1901.

Bagot served with a surgical unit in Serbia during the First Balkan War, for which she was awarded the Serbian Order of the Red Cross. During the First World War, she organised a hospital for the French army in Caen, leaving the UK for France on 12 September 1914, and then a hospital for the Belgian Army in 1915. She was awarded two British war medals and the Belgian Queen Elisabeth Medal for her war service. A devout Christian, she was Vice-President of Church Army Council in 1927.

On 19 June 1885, she married Josceline Bagot, son of Colonel Charles Bagot (son of Sir Charles Bagot) a British Army offer and later politician, at St Mark's Church, Mayfair. Together they had four children: one son and three daughters. Their son was Alan Desmond Bagot, the first heir born in Levens Hall for 200 years; he served in the Royal Horse Guards during the First World War. Josceline died in 1913, and the baronetage (Bagot of Levens Hall) that was being created for him was awarded instead to their son, then aged 17; Sir Alan Desmond Bagot, 1st Baronet died in 1920 without issue and so the baronetage went extinct. In 1920, she married the Revd Sidney Bellingham Swann (1862–1942), father of Sidney Ernest Swann. Late in her second marriage, her husband became increasingly erratic, culminating in his unsuccessful attempt to murder her and his admission to an asylum. She died on 21 February 1940.

== Selected works ==
- Bagot, Theodosia (1901). Shadows of the War. London: E. Arnold.

== Gallery ==
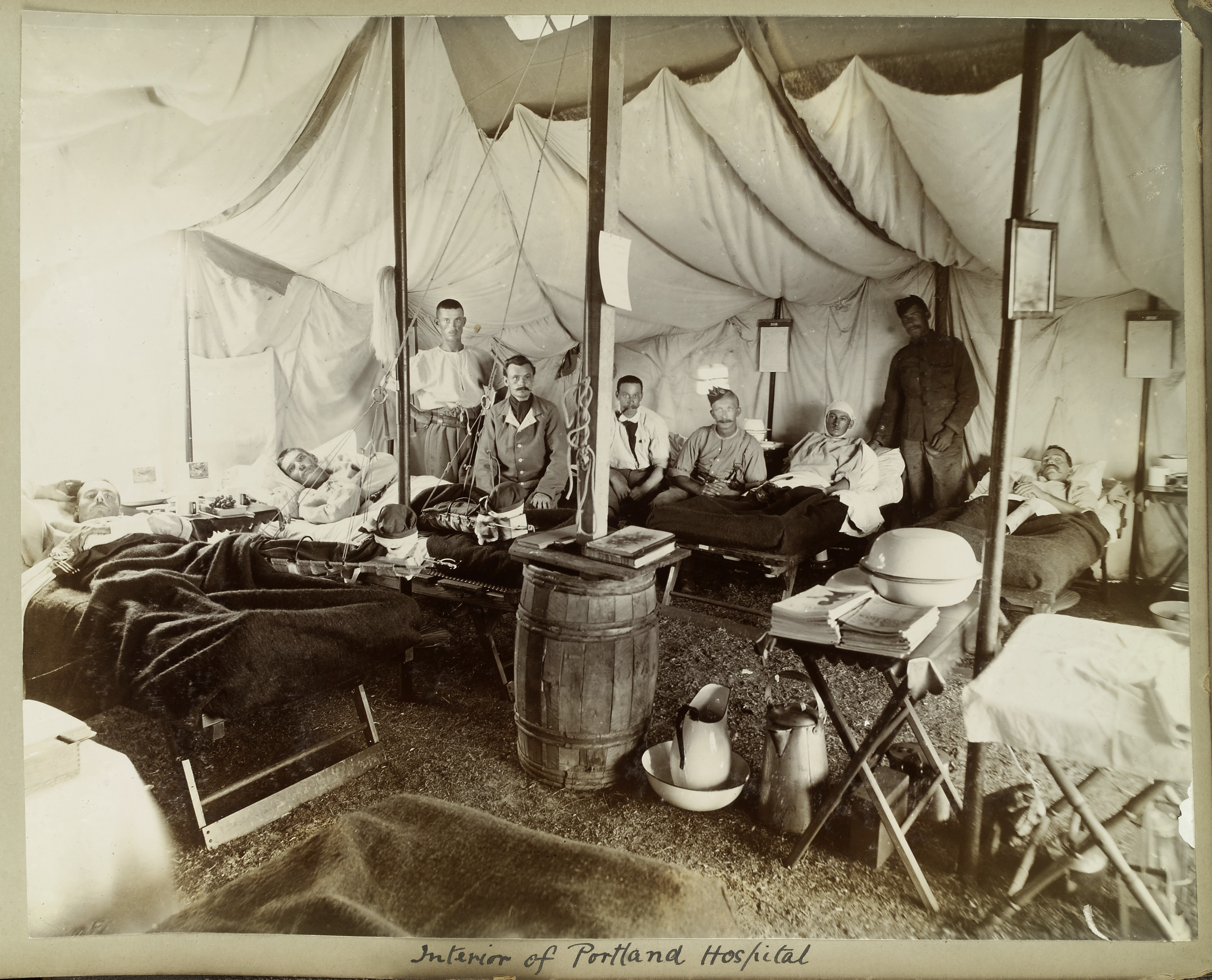
Interior of Portland Hospital, South Africa

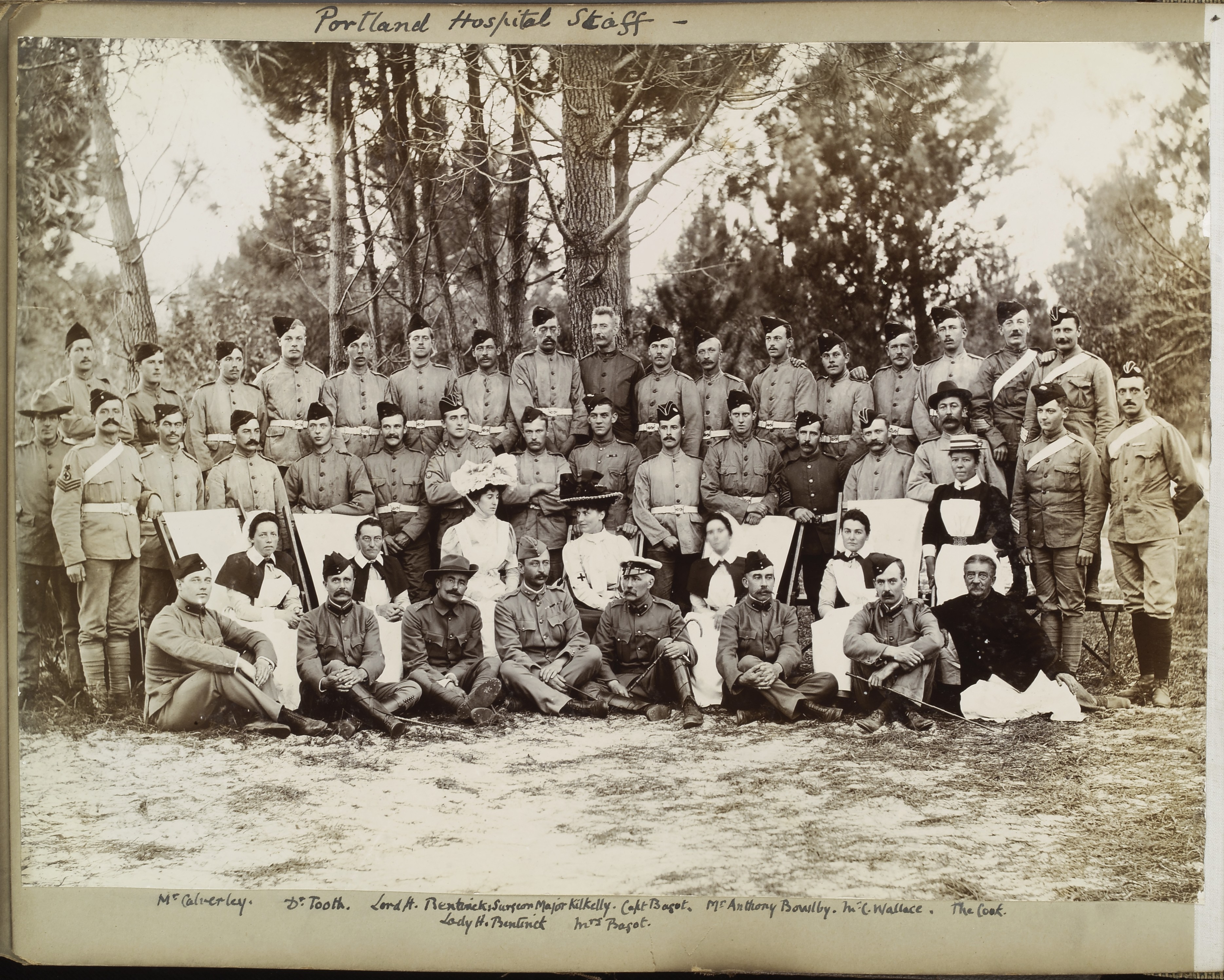
Portland Hospital staff, including Bagot (centre, black hat)
