= D. C. Stewart-Smith =

British barrister and Deputy Judge Advocate

Major Dudley Cautley Stewart-Smith MBE (12 October 1894 – 8 June 1957) was a British barrister and a Deputy Judge Advocate. He also served as a Councillor on Calcutta Municipal Corporation and as a member of the State Council of Ceylon.

Dudley Cautley Stewart-Smith was born on 12 October 1894 in Cheshire, the eldest son of Sir Dudley Stewart-Smith and Katherine née Cautley. He studied at the University College, Oxford.

Stewart-Smith received a call to the bar by the Middle Temple on 17 November 1916.

He initially enlisted with the Royal Fusiliers (City of London Regiment) and in December 1914 was transferred as a 2nd Lieutenant to the 3rd Battalion Black Watch (Royal Highlanders). In January 1916 Stewart-Smith saw action in the Battle of Hanna.

He married Phyllis née Luson in London in 1923, they had three children: Phyllis Jean (b.1925 Calcutta), Priscilla (b.1931 Colombo) and Geoffrey (b.1933 Colombo).

In 1924 he served as a Councillor on the Calcutta Municipal Corporation.

In 1932 he succeeded T. L. Villiers as the nominated member of the 1st State Council of Ceylon.

On 8 September 1939 he was appointed as a Deputy Judge Advocate, a position he held until he retired in 1955. Between 1946 and 1947 he served as one of the members of War crimes tribunal in Hamburg, after the end of World War II.

Stewart-Smith died on 8 June 1957 in Weybridge, Surrey.
