= Daniel Wilson (MP) =

British Whig politician

Daniel Wilson (1680 – 31 May 1754) of Dallam Tower, Westmorland was a British Whig politician who sat in the House of Commons for a total of 34 years between 1708 and 1747.

Wilson was born on 8 March 1680, the son of Edward Wilson of Park House, Leck, Lancashire and his wife Katherine Fleming, daughter of Sir Daniel Fleming of Rydal Hall, Westmorland. He became a Justice of the Peace in 1706.

Wilson was encouraged in his political career, by his uncle Sir William Fleming, 1st Baronet. At the 1708 general election he was elected as Whig Member of Parliament for Westmorland. He was returned unopposed in 1710 and 1713.

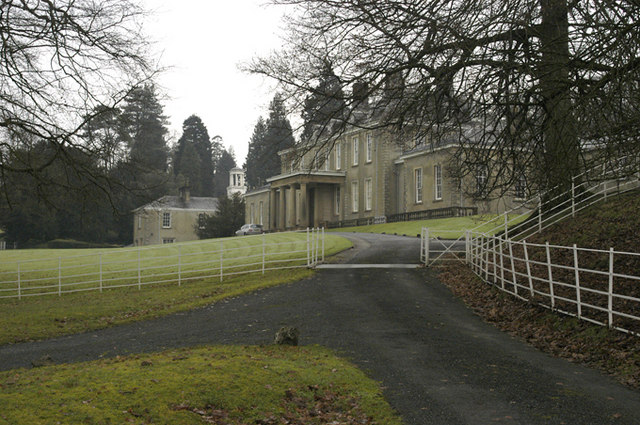
The driveway and front of Dallam Tower

Wilson was returned unopposed as MP for Westmorland at the 1715 general election. In 1716, he married Elizabeth Crowle, daughter of William Crowle, merchant, of Hull, Yorkshire. Then in 1720, his father died and as the eldest surviving son, he inherited the family estate. He did not stand for Parliament at the 1722 general election. In 1723, he rebuilt Dallam Tower. He was chosen to be High Sheriff of Lancashire for the year 1727 to 1728, and at the 1727 general election resumed his seat in Parliament for Westmorland without opposition. He was returned unopposed again in 1734 but in 1741 there was a contest in which he topped the poll. He stood down at the 1747 general election in favour of his son Edward.

Wilson died on 31 May 1754, leaving four sons and two daughters. His brothers-in-law George Crowle and Richard Crowle were also Members of Parliament.

Parliament of Great Britain
Preceded by Robert Lowther; Michael Fleming	Member of Parliament for Westmorland; 1708–1722; With: James Grahme	Succeeded by Anthony Lowther; James Grahme
Preceded by Anthony Lowther; James Grahme	Member of Parliament for Westmorland; 1727–1747; With: Anthony Lowther 1727–1741; Sir Philip Musgrave, 6th Baronet 1741–1747	Succeeded by Edward Wilson; John Dalston
