= Deryck Abel =

British author, editor and political activist

- Born: Deryck Robert Endsleigh Abel; 9 September 1918; Salisbury, Wiltshire, England
- Died: 13 February 1965 (aged 46)
- Education: London School of Economics; London University
- Political party: Liberal Party
- Spouses: Gertrude Kent (div. 1962): Betty Edwards
- Children: 2
- Military career
- Allegiance: United Kingdom
- Conflicts: World War II

Deryck Abel (9 September 1918 – 13 February 1965) was a British author, editor and political activist, who was the editor of the Contemporary Review from 1960 until his death.

== Biography ==
Deryck Robert Endsleigh Abel was born in Salisbury, Wiltshire to Frederick and Beryl Abel. He came from a family of teachers, craftsmen and clerks; he and his parents moved to North London when he was a small boy.

Abel studied first at Tottenham County School, the pioneering co-educational grammar school in the county of Middlesex, and then at the London School of Economics and London University. He was unusual in his generation of men in that women teachers influenced him profoundly in the sixth form and at the LSE, notably the prominent social and economic historian, Professor Eileen Power.

In World War II he served in the 69th Searchlight Regiment, losing a leg in 1940. While convalescing at the Sussex home of Francis W. Hirst, he prepared A History of British Tariffs, 1923–42, which became the standard work on the subject. He was a founder of the Society for Individual Freedom, which met at the Individualist Bookshop.

With Sir Ernest Benn, and others, Abel was co-author of the Individualist Manifesto (1942), a response to the prevalence of dictatorship in Europe from Spain to the Soviet Union.

The manifesto argued that it was imperative that civil liberties and individual responsibility be rapidly restored in Britain after the war and not eroded further by an ever-expanding bureaucracy. The Manifesto also contended powerfully against restrictive practices by trade unions and the collusion between the state and big business that negated the goal of a wide diffusion of wealth in a property-owning democracy.

== Political activity ==
From the sixth form onwards, Abel was active in the Liberal Party, standing unsuccessfully in St Albans at the 1950 general election and in Torquay in 1951.

He shared the ambition of other activists like Lord Rea, Nancy Seear, Sir Andrew McFadyean and Leonard Behrens of reshaping and reviving the Liberal Party by leaving behind the internecine divisions of the inter-war period and making the case for a reconciliation of traditions of Gladstonian fiscal policy, individualism and the welfare state collectivism of Sir William Beveridge. In 1945, he resigned as secretary and editor of the Individualist Society to become secretary of the Free Trade Union. He also became editor of the Free Trader, for which he wrote regularly. He authored four books, including a centennial business history The House of Sage 1860–1960. He campaigned for a Liberty of the Subject Bill, and was honorary treasurer of the Freedom Defence Fund in the Willcock Identity Card case (1951).

As a freelance journalist, he contributed to diverse newspapers and other publications, that included The Times, The Irish Times, Neue Zürcher Zeitung, the Winnipeg Free Press, Parliamentary Affairs, Journal of Politics and Far and Wide.

During the 1950s Abel was a leading proponent of the construction of a Channel Tunnel, to link Britain with France, and published a book on the history and engineering of the tunnel projects.

He was chairman of the Liberal News, a regular publication for liberal activists. He served as vice-chairman of the Liberal Party Organisation (1956–7), then as chairman of the Liberal Party Executive (1957–9), and vice-president of the Liberal Party Organisation (1960–2), when he played a major part in the move of Lord Ogmore from Labour to the Liberal Party. In 1959, he headed the poll in the election for the Liberal Party Executive.

He also stood unsuccessfully in Worthing at the 1959 general election and served as an official of the National Liberal Club.

Meanwhile, the election in 1956 of Jo Grimond as party leader reanimated the Liberal Party, ushering in a partial revival and foreshadowing a struggle to establish a viable three-party system.

In 1959, Abel resigned from the Free Trade Union and the Free Trader following their takeover by supporters of Oliver Smedley who, contending that the Conservative Party was pseudo-socialist, sought to promote right-wing ideas through the Liberal Party. Between 1962 and 1965, he worked with the prominent publishing house of Messrs. Longman, Green and Co. Ltd.

Abel had contributed articles and book reviews to the monthly Liberal publication Contemporary Review, for which his second wife was an editor, since 1941. Succeeding the eminent Liberal historian of European politics and diplomacy, Dr G.P. Gooch, Abel served as editor of the Contemporary Review from 1960 to 1965. He encouraged articles on such diverse themes as economic integration and the EEC, civil liberties, liberal internationalism, proportional representation and the suffrage, employee shareholding, and worker representation on the boards of enterprises. He also expanded coverage of literary themes.

== Personal life ==
In 1944, Abel married a school friend, Gertrude Kent, a teacher and musician, with whom he had one son and one daughter. The marriage was dissolved in 1962. He then married Betty Edwards, a college lecturer and member of the editorial staff of the Contemporary Review.

He died in 1965 at age 46, his health never having recovered from his wartime experiences.

Party political offices
Preceded by Geoffrey Acland	Chairman of the Liberal Party; 1957–1959	Succeeded by Leonard Behrens
