= John Foster Barham =

British politician

John Foster Barham (1799 – 22 May 1838) was a British politician.

Barham was the eldest son of Joseph Foster Barham, Member of Parliament for Stockbridge. He lived at Stockbridge House in Hampshire, and Appleby Castle in Westmorland.

At the 1820 UK general election, Barham was elected for the Whigs in Stockbridge, alongside his father. He seldom attended Parliament, and spent time running his father's Mesopotamia Estate in Jamaica, on which the family owned slaves.

Barham stood down from Parliament at the 1826 UK general election, as his father had fallen out with the seat's new patron. His father attempted to secure him a seat in Appleby, but this was unsuccessful. At the 1830 UK general election, he stood in Stockbridge again, this time in support of the Tories, but was defeated. He stood again in 1831, describing himself as a reformer, and winning the seat. In Parliament, he argued in favour of reducing the maximum period between general elections.

Barham inherited his father's estates in 1832, including the Mesopotamia Estate in Jamaica. At the 1832 UK general election, Stockbridge was disenfranchised, something which Barham opposed but did not vote against. He instead stood in Westmorland, but was not elected. In 1834/1835, he served as High Sheriff of Pembrokeshire.

Barham next stood in the 1834 Kendal by-election, which he won, and he held the seat at the 1835 UK general election. By 1836, he was in poor health, and in March 1837 he was certified as being of unsound mind, leading to him not standing in the 1837 UK general election. He died the following year.

Parliament of the United Kingdom
| Preceded by Joseph Foster Barham; George de Hochepied | Member of Parliament for Stockbridge; 1820 – 1826; With: Joseph Foster Barham (1820–1822); Edward Smith-Stanley (1822–1826) | Succeeded by Thomas Grosvenor; George Wilbraham |
| Preceded by George Wilbraham; William Sloane-Stanley | Member of Parliament for Stockbridge; 1831–1832; With: Stratford Canning | Constituency abolished |
| Preceded by James Brougham | Member of Parliament for Kendal; 1834 – 1837 | Succeeded by George William Wood |
