= John Beetham =

English politician (died c. 1415)

Sir John Beetham (died c. 1415) was an English politician. He sat as MP for Westmorland in 1406. He was knighted by April 1388.

He also served as collector of taxes in Westmorland in November 1377, March 1380, December 1380, December 1385, November 1388, January 1392, March 1393, October 1393 and December 1402; commissioner of array in Westmorland in February 1379 and May 1415; and justice of the peace for Westmorland from 15 July 1389 till June 1390.

He was the son and heir of Robert Beetham. He possibly married Margaret, the sister of Sir William Tunstall and they had at least one son, Thomas Beetham. By 1403, he was married to Christine.
