= Leonard Behrens =

British politician (1890–1978)

Leonard Behrens

Sir Leonard Frederick Behrens CBE (15 October 1890 – 12 March 1978) was a British Liberal Party politician and public figure.

Born in Manchester, Behrens studied at Manchester Grammar School, Rugby School and Manchester University. He was active in the family business and with the Manchester Chamber of Commerce. During World War I, he worked for the Serbian Relief Fund in Thessaloniki, and was awarded the Order of St Sava. Back in Britain, he became President of the Manchester Liberal Federation, and was an official of a large number of local bodies, including the Manchester Statistical Society, the Design and Industries Association, the Royal Manchester College of Music, the Hallé Concert Society and the University of Manchester. He also served as a JP.

He stood unsuccessfully as the Liberal candidate in Manchester Withington at the 1945 and 1950 general elections.

Behrens was a keen supporter of the League of Nations Union, and later the United Nations Association, becoming vice-president of the World Federation of United Nations Associations. From 1955 to 1957, he served as President of the Liberal Party, and from 1959 to 1961 he was the party's Chair.

Party political offices
Preceded by Philip Rea	President of the Liberal Party; 1955–1957	Succeeded by Nathaniel Micklem
Preceded by Deryck Abel	Chairman of the Liberal Party; 1959–1961	Succeeded by Desmond Banks
Professional and academic associations
Preceded by R. C. Reynolds	President of the Manchester Statistical Society; 1942–44	Succeeded by Sir John Hicks
