= John Whitwell =

English politician

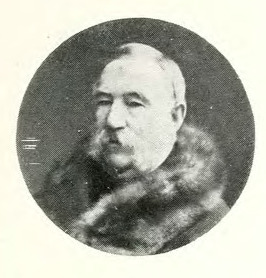
- Born: 6 September 1811; Kendal
- Died: 28 November 1880; Kendal
- Occupation: Politician
- Mother: Hannah Maria Fisher Whitwell

John Whitwell (6 September 1811 – 28 November 1880) was an English Liberal Party politician who sat in the House of Commons from 1868 to 1880.

Whitwell was the son of Isaac Whitwell of Kendal and his wife Maria Fisher daughter of William Fisher of Thorpe Hall, Leeds. He was educated at the Kendal Friends School and at the Darlington Friend's School. He was a manufacturer and president of the Kendal Chamber of Commerce and one of the London standing committee of the National Association of the Chambers of Commerce. He was mayor of Kendal six times and a J.P. for Kendal and for Westmorland. He was also Lieutenant-colonel of the 1st Battalion Westmorland Rifle Volunteers and author of The necessary legislation for incorporating Trades Unions.

When the previous Member of Parliament (MP) for Kendal retired, Whitwell received a requisition signed by 1352 of the borough's 1884 electors to stand at the 1868 general election Whitwell was elected MP for Kendal and was returned unopposed. He held the seat until his death in 1880. Whitwell declared himself "in favour of seats in Ireland, re-enacting of small tenements' bill, retrenchment, and for a national and higher system of education."

Six months after being returned to the Commons at the 1880 general election, Whitwell died at the age of 68.

Whitwell married Anna Maude, daughter of William Maude of Horton Grange, Bradford in 1837.

Parliament of the United Kingdom
Preceded by George Glyn	Member of Parliament for Kendal; 1874 – 1880	Succeeded by James Cropper
