= Jean Chardin =

French-born English traveller and writer (1643–1713)

Sir Jean Chardin FRS
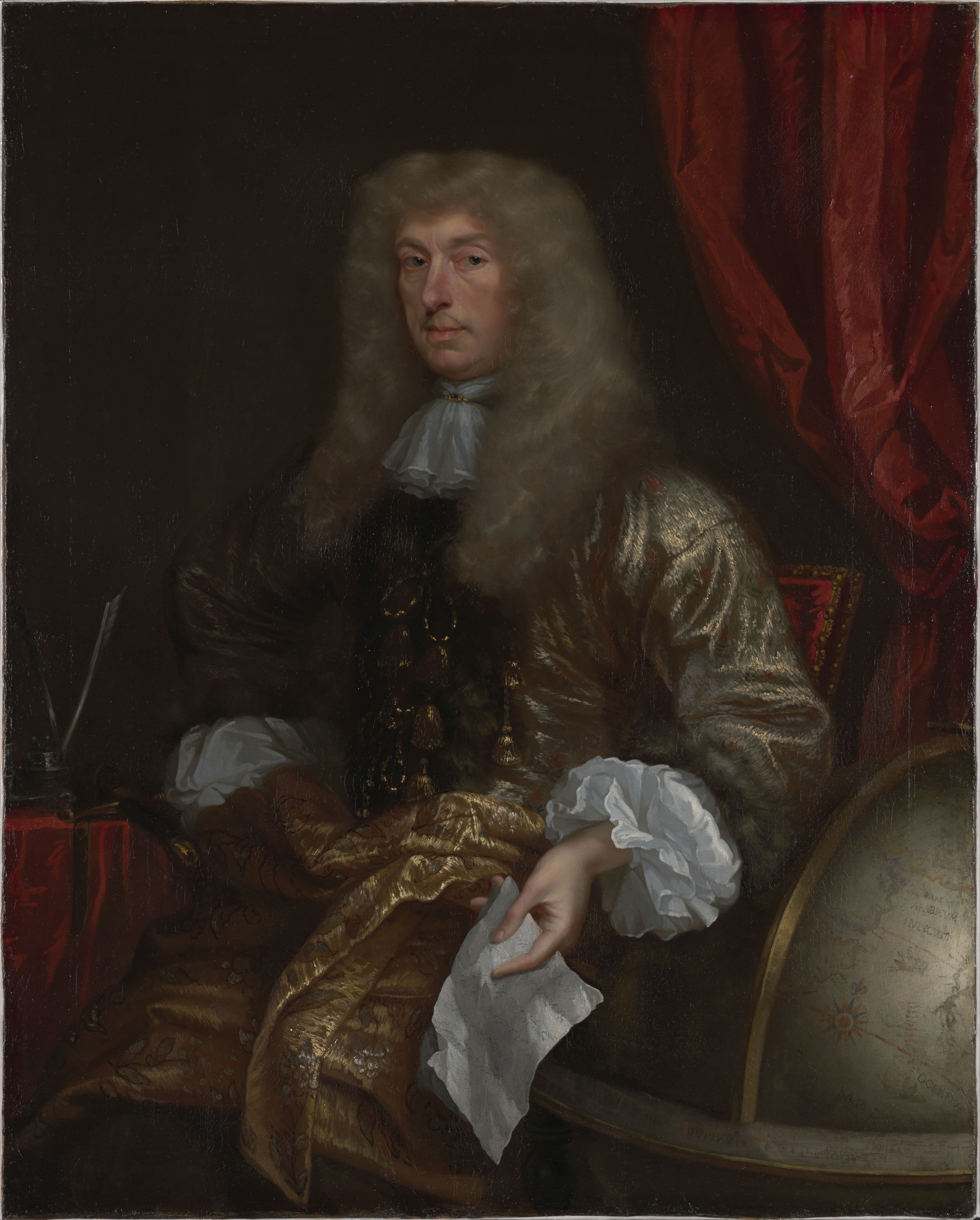
- Born: Jean-Baptiste Chardin; 16 November 1643; Paris, France
- Died: 5 January 1713 (aged 69); Chiswick, Middlesex

Jean Chardin (born Jean-Baptiste Chardin; 16 November 1643 – 5 January 1713), known as Sir John Chardin in England, was a French jeweller, traveller and writer, who emigrated to England in 1681, at the age of 37. His ten-volume book The Travels of Sir John Chardin is regarded as one of the finest works of early Western scholarship on Safavid Iran and the Near East in general.

== Life and work ==
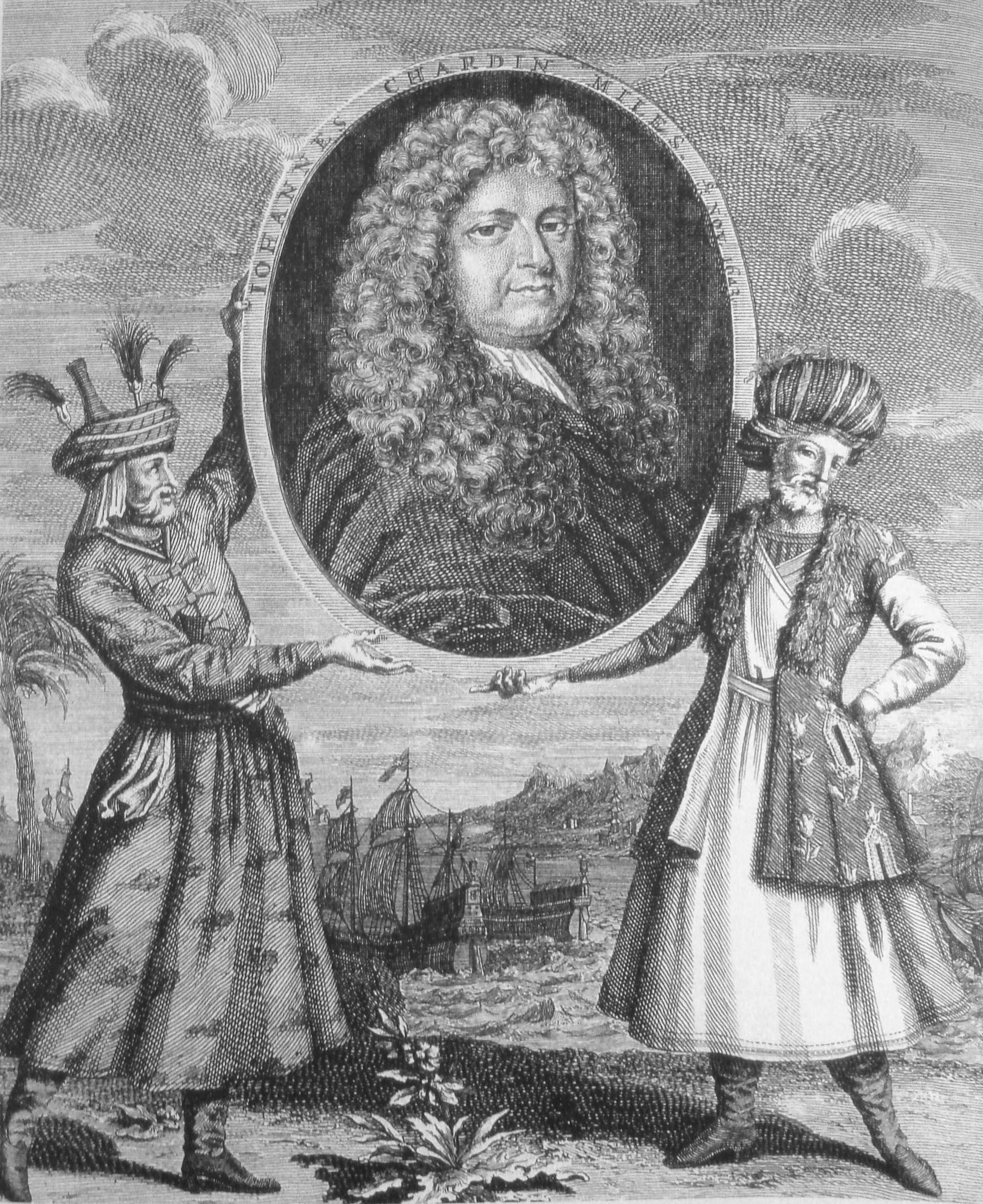
Frontispiece of Voyage du Chevalier Chardin en Perse et autres lieux de l'Orient, 1739

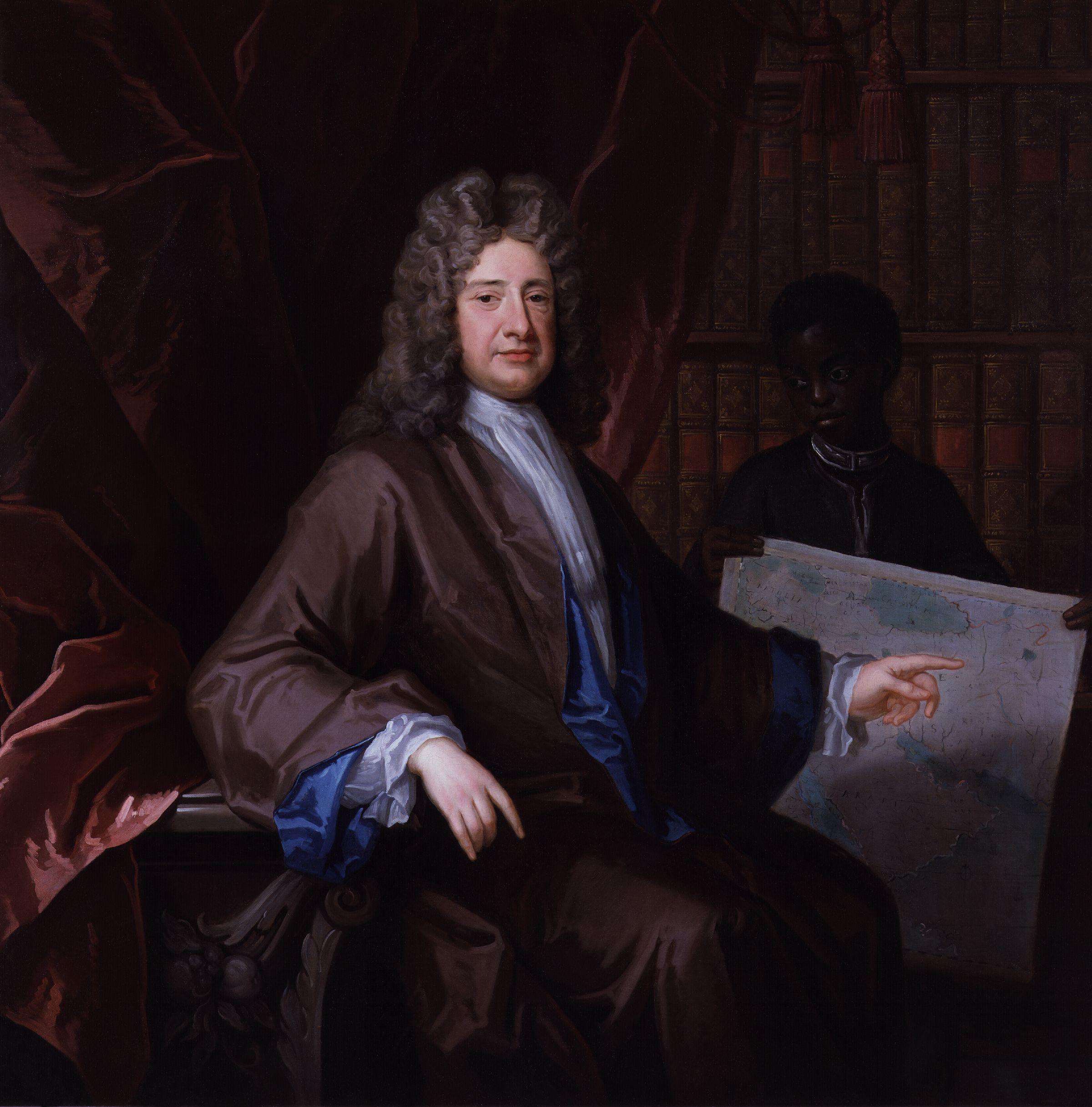
c. 1711 portrait of Chardin and a Black attendant

=== Travels to Persia ===
He was born in Paris, son of a wealthy merchant, jeweller of the Place Dauphine, and followed his father's business. In 1664, he started working for the East Indies with an associate, Antoine Raisin, a Lyon merchant. They journeyed by Constantinople and the Black Sea, reaching Persia in early 1666. The same year the shah, Abbas II, made Chardin his agent for the purchase of jewels. In late 1667, he visited India with Raisin, returned to Persia in 1669 and the following year arrived in Paris. He issued an account of some events to which he was an eyewitness in Persia, entitled Le Couronnement de Soleiman Troisième Paris, 1671. A learned nobleman, Mirza Sefi, a prisoner in his own palace at Isfahan, had entertained him, instructed him in the Persian language and assisted him in this work. Pétis de la Croix and Tavernier severely criticised it, while Ange de la Brosse strongly defended it.

Chardin again started for Persia in August of 1671. Traveling with writer and artist Guillaume-Joseph Grelot. He was at Constantinople from March to July 1672. A quarrel between the grand vizier and the French ambassador made the position of French subjects dangerous. Chardin escaped in a small vessel across the Black Sea and made a most adventurous journey by Caffa, and through Georgia, and Armenia to Isfahan, which he reached in 1673. At Sapias, he was robbed by thugs in Samegrelo of all he possessed except two small bundles, worth £6,000. He stayed at Isfahan four years, following the court in all its removals and making particular journeys throughout the land, from the Caspian to the Persian Gulf and the river Indus, and visiting several Indian cities. He was commissioned by the Shah to be the first to import and use a printing press in Iran. However due to opposition by Muslim copyists he was restricted to printing liturgy for the minority Christian community. By these two journeys he realised a considerable fortune, and deciding to return home he reached Europe in 1677 by a voyage round the Cape of Good Hope.

Of four volumes originally projected the first volume was published in 1686, Journal du Voyage . . . de Chardin en Perse et aux Indes Orientales, London, fol. An English translation was issued concurrently. This volume contains the author's journey from Paris to Isfahan, and has the author's half-length portrait by Loggan, with eighteen copper plates, mostly folding. His former work is reprinted there with a fulsome 'Epistle Dedicatory to James II.'

Chardin in his preface announced three other volumes to follow. The last, which was to contain a short history of Persia, along with his diaries for 1675–77, never appeared. The other three volumes (with many additions to the first) were published at Amsterdam, 1711, 4to, Voyages de Mons. le Chevalier Chardin, as the complete work. In 1711 another edition, with his translation of La Relation des Mingreliens, by J. M. Zampi, appeared in ten vols., Amsterdam, l2mo; and in 1735 another edition was published in four vols. 4to, containing a great number of passages added from his manuscripts, but with many omissions of violent Calvinistic passages. The most complete reprint is that of M. L. Langles, in ten vols. 8vo, Paris, 1811. Chardin's style of writing is simple and graphic, and he gives a faithful account of what he saw and heard. Montesquieu, Rousseau, Gibbon and Helvetius acknowledge the value of his writings; and Sir William Jones says he gave the best account of Muslim nations ever published. Extracts from his works appear in all the chief collections of travels, but there is no complete English translation.

=== Resettlement in England ===
In 1681, Chardin determined to settle in England because of the persecution of Protestants in France. He was well received at court, and was soon after appointed court jeweller. He was knighted by Charles II at Whitehall, 17 November 1681. The same day he married a Protestant lady, Esther, daughter of M. de Lardinière Peigné, councillor in the Parliament of Rouen, then a refugee in London. He carried on a considerable trade in jewels, and in the correspondence of his time was called 'the flower of merchants.' This trade was driven by an extensive commercial partnership with Elihu Yale, the first President of Madras. Operating a global diamond network, Jean's brother Daniel Chardin and Yale acquired rough gems from India's Golconda mines, which were shipped to Amsterdam to be faceted and polished under Jean's oversight during his tenure as a company agent in Holland, before reaching London for final sale.

In 1682, when he lived in Holland House, Kensington, he was elected a fellow of the Royal Society. In 1684, the king sent him as envoy to Holland, where he stayed some years and was styled agent to the East India Company. Upon his return to London he devoted most of his time to oriental studies.

=== Publication of Travels ===
In the prefaces to his works in 1686 and 1711, besides travels he speaks of what he calls 'my favourite desipi,' or 'Notes upon Passages of to the Holy Scriptures, illustrated by Eastern ally Customs and Manners,' as having occupied his time for many years.

He did not live after to publish it, and after his death the manuscript was supposed to be lost. Some of his descendants advertised a reward of twenty guineas for it. When Thomas Harmer published a second edition of his Observations on divers passages of Scripture, 2 vols., London, 1776, 8vo, it was found that he had recovered the lost manuscript in six small volumes with the help of Sir Philip Musgrave, a descendant of Chardin, and had incorporated almost all of them in his work, under the author's name, or signed 'MS. C.,' i.e. manuscript of Chardin.

=== Later Years ===
In his latter years Chardin lived at Turnham. Sir John died in Chiswick, London in 1713. He was buried in Turnham Green (Chiswick). A funeral monument to Chardin exists in Westminster Abbey, bearing the inscription Sir John Chardin – nomen sibi fecit eundo ("he made a name for himself by travelling").

The remains of Chardin's library were sold by James Levy at Tom's coffee-house, St. Martin's Lane, 1712–13.

== Family ==
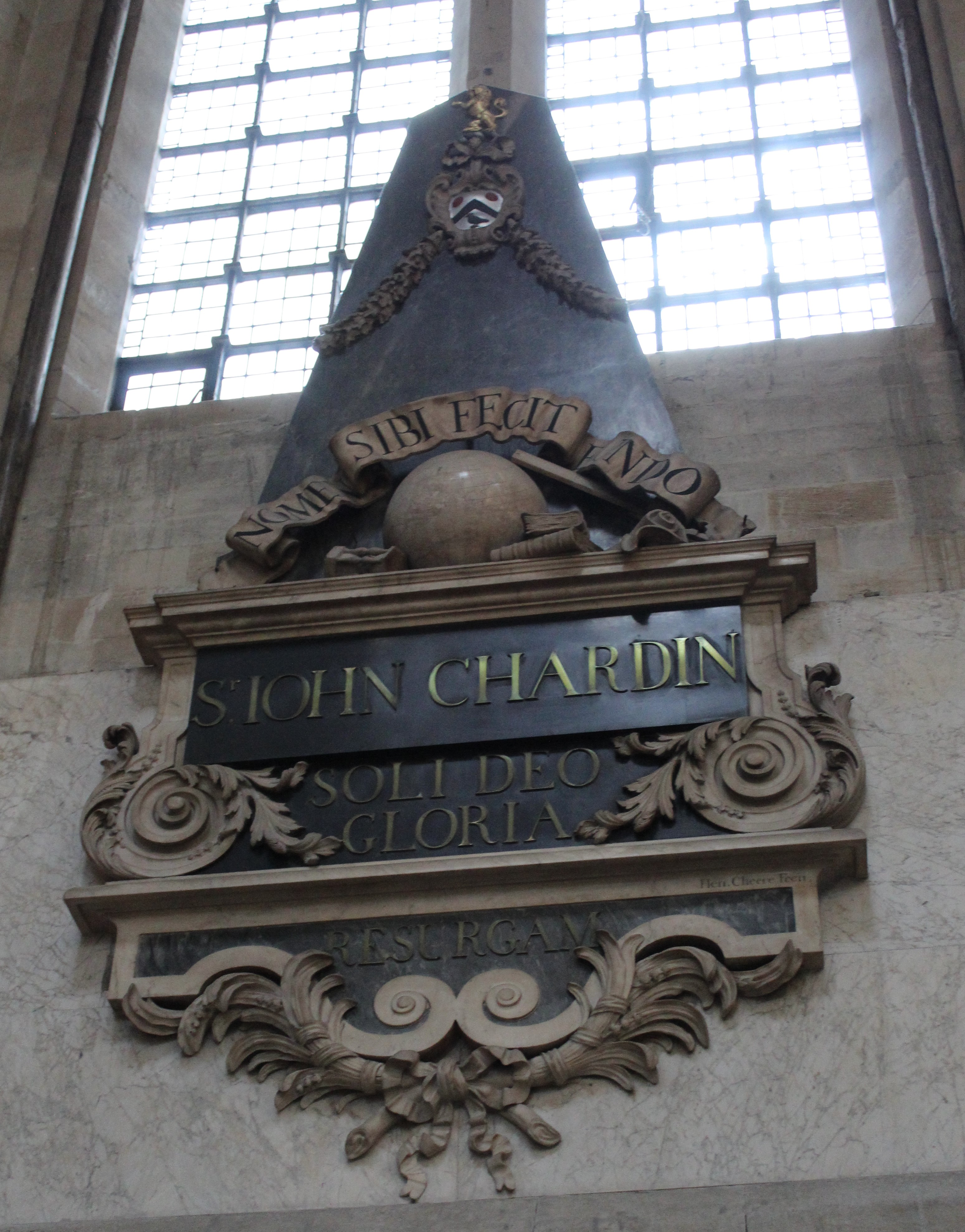
Chardin's memorial in Westminster Abbey, by Sir Henry Cheere

Chardin had three brothers, Daniel, Antoine, and Guillaume, and a sister Charlotte. His brother Guillaume, named William Chardin in England, was involved in a Court of Chancery case alongside Jean. The two brothers and Nicholas Chardin, were named as co-defendants in a 1696 Lincolnshire property dispute alongside Charles Fairfax, 5th Viscount Fairfax of Emley against George Porter.

He had four sons and three daughters. His eldest son Charles was born in March 1684 but proved a huge disappointment to his father. Charles was subsequently sent to live in Madras with his uncle, Daniel Chardin, a merchant who served as the Mayor of Madras starting in 1698. John, was created a baronet 1720 and died unmarried. He had two other sons Daniel and George. He left his large Kempton Manor House and estate, Sunbury-on-Thames to his nephew Sir Philip Chardin Musgrave.

== Value of Chardin's work ==
Modern scholars consider the 1811 edition of Voyages (edited by the Orientalist Louis-Mathieu Langlès) to be the standard version. The complete book has never been translated into English; in fact, English-language versions contain less than half of the original material.

Early readers commended Chardin's work for its fullness and fidelity, and he received praise from a number of Enlightenment thinkers, among them Montesquieu, Rousseau, Voltaire and Gibbon. Latter-day scholars of Persia also vouch for his importance; according to John Emerson, "his information on Safavid Persia outranks that of all other Western writers in range, depth, accuracy, and judiciousness." Chardin travelled far and wide, had a good command of the Persian language, and left detailed accounts of the places and people he encountered. He also had direct access to the Safavid court, and his descriptions of contemporary politics and administration are highly regarded. Although there are occasional lapses in his books, he is generally trusted as a reliable witness, and his work has been used as a source for diverse studies on Safavid history, government, economics, anthropology, religion, art and culture.

== French-language biographies of Chardin ==
Jean Chardin's life story forms the basis of Dirk Van der Cruysse's 1998 book Chardin le Persan, and of the partly fictionalised 2011 biography, Le Joaillier d'Ispahan by Danielle Digne.

== See also ==
- France–Iran relations
- Franco-Persian alliance
- Chardin baronets
- Jean-Baptiste Tavernier
