= Robert Sandford (died 1403/1404) =

Member of the Parliament of England

Robert Sandford (died 1403/4), of Sandford and Burton, Westmorland, was an English Member of Parliament.

== Family ==
Sandford was the son of the MP, Thomas Sandford and his wife, Mary. Robert married a woman named Margaret and they had two daughters. Margaret outlived him and she raised his children with her next husband, also an MP, Sir Robert Leybourne.

== Career ==
He was a Member (MP) of the Parliament of England for Westmorland in September 1388.

Parliament of England
Preceded by Sir Thomas Blenkinsop; Thomas Strickland	Member of Parliament for Westmorland; Sep. 1388; With: Hugh Salkeld	Succeeded by John Crackenthorpe; Hugh Salkeld
