= William Beauchamp (MP for Westmorland) =

English politician

William Beauchamp (fl. 1405–1424) was an English politician. He sat as MP for Westmorland in 1420.
