= Hugh Salkeld (died c. 1440) =

English politician

Hugh Salkend (died c. 1440), of Rosgill, Westmorland, was an English politician.

He was a member (MP) of the parliament of England for Westmorland in 1401.
