= The Contemporary Review =

British magazine

- Editor-in-chief: Richard Mullen
- Frequency: Biannually; formerly quarterly
- Publisher: The Contemporary Review Company
- Founded: 1866
- Final issue: January 2013 (print)
- Country: United Kingdom
- Language: English
- Website: www.contemporaryreview.co.uk
- ISSN: 0010-7565
- OCLC: 746948187

The Contemporary Review is a British biannual, formerly quarterly, magazine. It has an uncertain future as of 2013.

== History ==
The magazine was established in 1866 by Alexander Strahan and a group of intellectuals intent on promoting their views on current affairs. They intended it to be the church-minded counterpart and in May 1877 published an article on the "Ethics of Belief" from a distinguished Cambridge don on moral skepticism in law and philosophy. Prof Clifford developed scientific theories on metaphysical beliefs, rationalism, and the empirical value of scientific enquiry that underpinned advanced physics. By the end of the century his views had a practicable impact upon new social realism. Clifford was quickly rebutted by Prof Wase in June 1877. Articles by Rev R.F. Littledale, a regular contributor included "Christianity and Patriotism".

This contrasted to the radical artistic perspectives of the Fortnightly Review. The first editor-in-chief was Henry Alford, Dean of Canterbury. The magazine rapidly acquired distinction as a forum for intellectual discussion. It was one of the first periodicals to devote considerable space to the arts. More particularly, it became an arena for the theological and ecclesiastical disputes which at that time rent the Church of England. Dean Alford retired in 1870 and his successor, J. T. Knowles, greatly enhanced the already established international standing of the journal. He widened the coverage and attracted contributors of great distinction, including Cardinal Manning, Frances Power Cobbe, Julia Wedgwood, John Ruskin, Vernon Lee, Aldous Huxley, Robert Spence, Emilia Dilke, Henry Stanley, W. E. Gladstone, Matthew Arnold, F. D. Maurice and J. M. Barrie.

It was in the period from 1882 to 1911, under the long editorship of Percy Bunting, that The Contemporary Review turned increasingly to politics and social reform, acquiring a general, liberal outlook, though without party ties; and continuing to provide a platform for debate. Other fields were not neglected during this period. For example, Holman Hunt's articles were of great importance, and were relied upon in preparing the Holman Hunt Exhibition at the Victoria and Albert Museum in 1969.

In 1911, G. P. Gooch, the historian and Liberal MP for Bath (1906-1910), was appointed editor and continued to preside over the magazine for forty-nine years. While he gave much emphasis to the treatment of international affairs, it continued to cover a wide range of interests. The political outlook of the journal continued to be left of centre.

For many years, under Gooch's editorship, J. E. G. de Montmorency was literary editor, and John Scott Lidgett, the Methodist theologian and leader, was in editorial charge of religious contributions, providing a Free Church background very different from the establishment churchmanship of Dean Alford. Gooch was succeeded in 1960 by Deryck Abel, who held the post of editor until his death in 1965. A former chairman of the Liberal Party Executive, three times a parliamentary candidate in the Liberal interest and a writer on the historical aspects of libertarian issues, Abel retained the magazine's broad variety of content whilst showing particular concern for its international outlook. Rosalind Wade became editor in 1970 and continued in office until 1989. Betty Abel was editor from 1989 to 1991. The current editor is Richard Mullen.

In 1911 the International Review was incorporated. In 1956 the directors acquired the ailing Fortnightly of 1865, which was founded by Anthony Trollope as the Fortnightly Review with George Henry Lewes as its editor.

== Modern magazine ==
The Contemporary Review is an entirely independent publication. As in the past, international subjects in the widest sense receive considerable attention. It also continues to have a broad spectrum of interests, including home affairs and politics, literature and the arts, history, travel, and religion. There is a quarterly book section.

After reducing to two annual issues in the late 2000s, the Winter 2013 edition published in January 2013 announced that it was to be the last print edition; the publication was giving consideration to continuing online.
