= William Threlkeld =

English politician (1347–1408)

WIlliam Threlkeld (1347 – 8 December 1408) was an English politician. He sat as MP for Westmorland in January 1380, 1381, Cumberland in January 1390, and Westmorland in 1402.

He also served as collector of taxes in Westmorland in August 1379, November 1392, March 1395 and in Cumberland in May 1398. He served as chief forester of Inglewood Forest in Cumberland from 8 June 1387 till 27 December 1389. He served as Justice of the Peace for Westmorland from 12 December 1393 till March 1397, 28 November 1399 till December 1405, and 8 February 1407 till his death on 8 December 1408.

He was the son and heir of John Threlkeld whom he predeceased and Alice (died by January 1387), the daughter of John Hodelston. He was the grandson of Sir William Threlkeld (died October 1371). By 1385, he married Margaret (died after December 1393) and had two daughters. By 1399, he married Katherine and had one son.

He was knighted by April 1379.
