= William de Beauchamp =

William de Beauchamp may refer to:

- William de Beauchamp (of Elmley), (c1105–c1170), Anglo-Norman baron and sheriff
- William de Beauchamp (1185) (c. 1185–1260), English judge and High Sheriff
- William de Beauchamp (d.1268), Anglo-Norman baron and sheriff
- William (III) de Beauchamp, (c. 1215 – 1269), Sheriff of Worcestershire
- William de Beauchamp, 9th Earl of Warwick (1237–1298), English nobleman and soldier
- William de Beauchamp, 1st Baron Bergavenny (c. 1343–1411), English peer
