= Geoffrey Acland =

British politician (1908–1964)

Arthur Geoffrey Dyke Acland
- Born: 17 May 1908; Hanover Square in London
- Died: 14 September 1964 (aged 56)
- Education: Hanover Square in London; Trinity College; Cambridge; University of Grenoble
- Occupation: British Liberal Party politician

Arthur Geoffrey Dyke Acland (17 May 1908 – 14 September 1964), known as Geoffrey Acland, was a British Liberal Party politician.

Born near Hanover Square in London to Liberal Party MP Francis Dyke Acland and Eleanor Margaret Cropper, Geoffrey was the younger brother of Richard Acland, who later became a Common Wealth Party and Labour Party MP. He studied at Rugby School, Trinity College, Cambridge, and the University of Grenoble. During the Second World War, he served with the Border Regiment, rising to become a Captain.

After the war, Acland became joint managing director of Cropper's paper mills in Burneside, near Kendal, and he stood unsuccessfully for the Liberal Party in Westmorland at each election from 1945 to 1959. From 1954 to 1956, he was the Chairman of the Liberal Party. Acland married Winifred Julian Dorothy Fothergill in 1932, and they were the parents of six children.

Party political offices
Preceded by Philip Fothergill	Chairman of the Liberal Party; 1954–1957	Succeeded by Deryck Abel
