= Charles Brandon (died 1551) =

English politician

Sir Charles Brandon (by 1521–1551), was an English politician.

He was a member (MP) of the parliament of England for Westmorland in 1547. He was an illegitimate son of Charles Brandon, 1st Duke of Suffolk.
