= Hugh Salkeld (died 1397 or 1398) =

English politician

Hugh Salkeld (died 1397 or 1398), of Rosgill, Westmorland, was an English politician.

He was a member (MP) of the parliament of England for Westmorland in September 1388, January 1390, November 1390, 1393 and January 1397.
