= Josceline Bagot =

British politician and army officer (1854-1913)

Josceline Fitzroy Bagot
- Born: 22 October 1854; Surrey
- Died: 1 March 1913 (aged 58)
- Military career
- Allegiance: British
- Branch: Army
- Rank: Honorary Lieutenant Colonel
- Units: Westmoreland and Cumberland Imperial Yeomanry
- Conflicts: Boer War
- Other work: Member of Parliament, Author

Josceline Fitzroy Bagot (22 October 1854 – 1 March 1913) was an English British Army officer and Conservative politician.

== Early life ==
Josceline Fitzroy Bagot was born in Ashtead, Surrey, the son of Col. Charles Bagot (son of Charles Bagot) and Sophia Louisa Percy (daughter of Josceline Percy)

== Military career ==
He joined the Army and received a commission in the Grenadier Guards in 1875 and was appointed Aide-de-Camp to the Governor-General of Canada in 1881–1882 and 1888–1889. He also saw service in the Boer War in 1899–1900, where he was mentioned in despatches and was the chief Military Censor. His wife was also in South Africa during the war, running a military hospital. He was later attached to the Westmoreland and Cumberland Imperial Yeomanry, where he was granted the honorary rank of lieutenant-colonel on 7 May 1902.

== Political career ==
He was twice returned as Conservative MP for Kendal (1892–1906 and 1910–1913), and served as a Parliamentary Secretary at both the Treasury and the Home Office. He was nominated for a baronetcy in 1913 but died the same year. The baronetcy was conferred instead on his only son, Sir Alan Bagot, 1st Baronet. Josceline Bagot was buried in St Peters churchyard, Heversham, Cumbria.

== Family ==
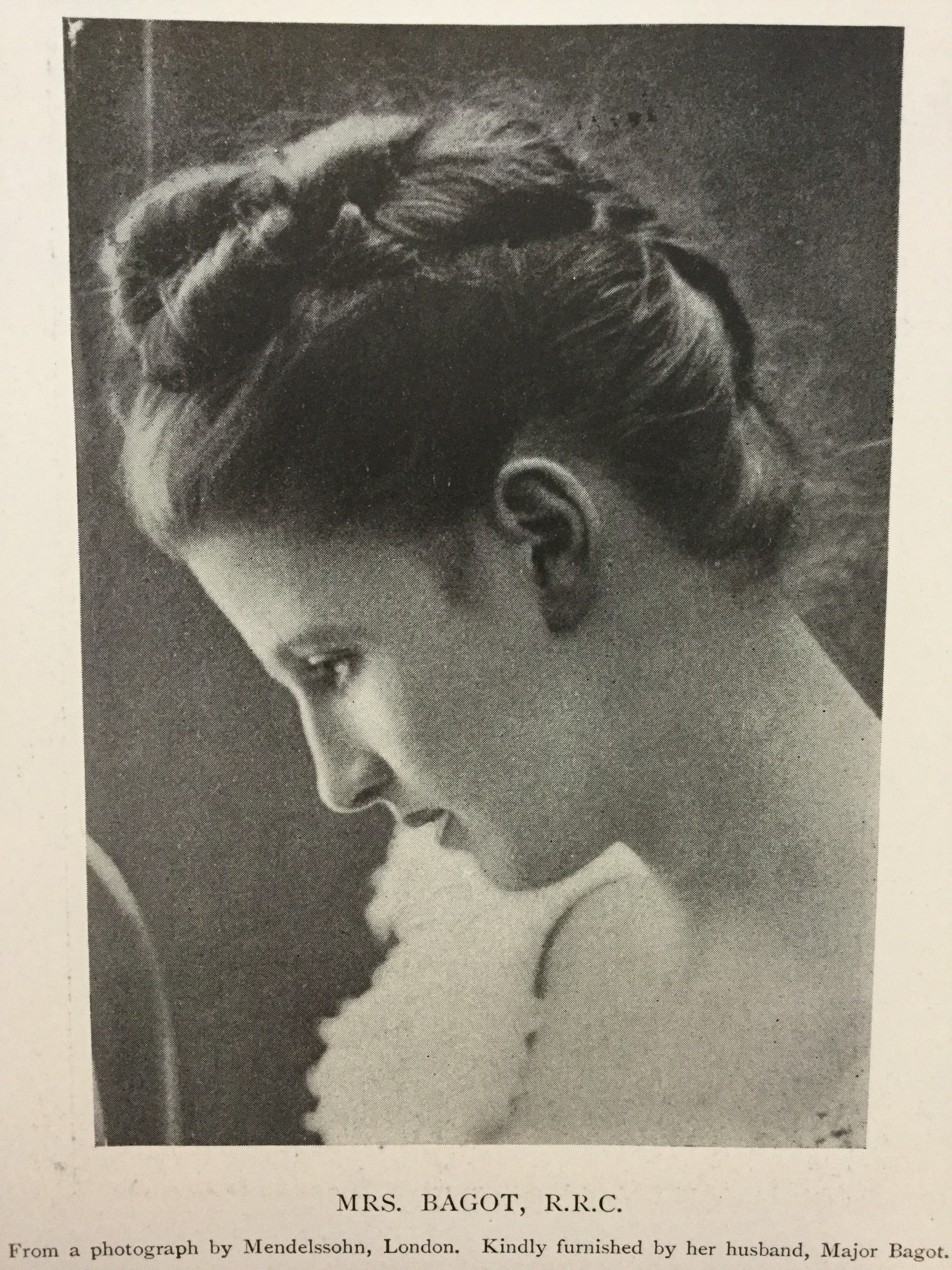
Theodosia Bagot. From a photograph by Mendelssohn, London.

He married on 11 June 1885, Theodosia "Dosia" Leslie (1865–1940), daughter of Sir John Leslie, 1st Baronet. She also received the Order of the Royal Cross and the South African medal for her service during the Boer War. The Bagots had four children, Alan Desmond (who became the 1st and last Baronet Bagot of Leven), Dorothy, Marjorie Constance and Mary. They lived at Levens Hall, near Kendal which Bagot had inherited from a distant relative, Mary Howard

== Publications ==
- Colonel James Grahme of Levens: A Biographical Sketch of Jacobite Times published by W. Kent & Co, 1886.

Parliament of the United Kingdom
Preceded by Earl of Bective	Member of Parliament for Kendal; 1892–1906	Succeeded by Dudley Stewart-Smith
Preceded by Dudley Stewart-Smith	Member of Parliament for Kendal; 1910–1913	Succeeded by John Weston
