= Westmorland (constituency) =

Parliamentary constituency in the United Kingdom, 1918–1983

- Former county constituency for the House of Commons
- Context: 1832–1868. Extract from 1837 result: the most central 'doubly' blue area

1918–1983
- Seats: one
- Created from: Appleby and Kendal
- Replaced by: Penrith and The Border and Westmorland and Lonsdale

1290–1885
- Seats: two
- Replaced by: Appleby and Kendal

Westmorland was a constituency covering the county of Westmorland in the North of England, which returned Members of Parliament to the House of Commons of England until 1707, House of Commons of Great Britain until 1801 and the House of Commons of the Parliament of the United Kingdom.

The constituency had two separate periods of existence. Until 1885, it returned two Members of Parliament (MPs) to the House of Commons of the Parliament of the United Kingdom. For the string of elections from 1885 general election it split in two: Appleby and Kendal, both of which had been parliamentary boroughs but were reconstituted as county constituencies. From 1918 to 1983, the constituency was recreated as a single-seater for the 1918 general election and abolished for the 1983 general election.

In the boundary changes in 1983 the southern part of the constituency became part of the new seat of Westmorland and Lonsdale and the northern area was transferred to Penrith and The Border.

== Boundaries ==
The 1918 – 1983 seat corresponded to the county of Westmorland even after the abolition of the administrative county in 1974.

== Members of Parliament ==
- Constituency created (1290)

=== MPs 1290–1640 ===
Parliament	First member	Second member
1290	Sir Richardus de Prestonne	Sir Williemus de Stirkland
1302	Thomas de Betham	
1305	Sir Hugh de Lowther	Nicholas de Leyburne
1308–1309	Thomas de Betham	
1309	Robert L'Angleys	
1311–1312	Thomas de Betham	
1311–1312	Robert L'Angleys	
1313	Sir Matthew de Redman	
1324	Sir Robertus de Sandeford	
1328	Sir Nicholas de Preston	
1331–1332	Sir Walter de Strickland	
1341–1342	Sir Thomas de Musgrave	
1343	Sir Richard de Preston	Sir Thomas de Musgrave
1344–1345	Sir Thomas de Musgrave	
1353	Sir Richard de Preston (Jnr)	
1355	William de Windesere	
1357	Sir Matthew de Redman	
1362	Sir John Preston	
1363	James Pickering	
1366	Sir John Preston	James Pickering
1368	Sir John Preston	
1371	Sir John Preston	
1377–c1400	Hugh Salkeld I	
1382	Sir John Preston	
1384	John de Mansergh	
1386	Sir John Derwentwater	Robert Clibern
1388 (Feb)	Sir Thomas Blenkinsop	Thomas Strickland
1388 (Sep)	Robert de Sandford	Hugh Salkeld I
1390 (Jan)	John Crackenthorpe	Hugh Salkeld I
1390 (Nov)	Sir Christopher Moresby	Hugh Salkeld I
1391	Sir William Curwen	William Thornburgh
1393	John Crackenthorpe	Hugh Salkeld I
1394	Sir William Curwen	William Thornburgh
1395	Sir Walter Strickland	William Crackenthorpe I
1397 (Jan)	John Lancaster	Hugh Salkeld I
1397 (Sep)	Sir William Curwen	William Crackenthorpe I
1399	Sir Thomas de Musgrave	John Crackenthorpe
1401	William Thornburgh	Hugh Salkeld II
1402	Sir William Threlkeld	(Sir) William Crackenthorpe I
1404 (Jan)	Roland Thornburgh	Sir Richard Duckett
1404 (Oct)	Sir Robert Leybourne	Thomas de Strickland II
1406	Sir John Beetham	(Sir) John Lancaster I
1407	Sir Alan Pennington	Thomas Warcop
1410		
1411	Sir Robert Leybourne	Christopher Moresby
1413 (Feb)
1413 (May)	Robert Crackenthorpe	John Hutton
1414 (Apr)	Robert Mauchell	Richard Wharton
1414 (Nov)	Thomas Warcop	William Thornburgh
1415	Robert Warcop	Thomas Warcop
1416 (Mar)	Roland Thornburgh	Robert Crackenthorpe
1416 (Oct)		
1417		
1419	Roland Thornburgh	Robert Crackenthorpe
1420	William Beauchamp	Thomas Greem II
1421 (May)	Robert Warcop	Robert Preston
1421 (Dec)	(Sir) John Lancaster I	William Blenkinsop
1429	Thomas de Strickland II	
1431	Thomas de Strickland II	
1435	Sir Thomas Parr	
1449	Sir Thomas Parr	
1450	Sir Thomas Parr	
1455	Sir Thomas Parr	
1459	?Sir Thomas Parr	
1467	William Parr, 1st Baron Parr of Kendal	
1473	William Parr, 1st Baron Parr of Kendal	
1510–1523	No Names Known	
1529	Sir William Musgrave	Thomas Blenkinsop
1536		
1539		
1542	Sir James Leyburn	Nicholas Bacon
1545	Sir Ingram Clifford	Sir James Leyburn
1547	Sir Charles Brandon, died and replaced in January 1552 by Sir Robert Bowes	Thomas Warcop
1553 (Mar)		
1553 (Oct)	Thomas Fallowfield	Thomas Warcop
1554 (Apr)	Thomas Fallowfield	Thomas Warcop
1554 (Nov)	Thomas Percy	Thomas Warcop
1555		
1558	Anthony Kempe	Thomas Sackville
1559 (Jan)	Lancelot Lancaster	Thomas Warcop
1562–1563	Walter Strickland	Gerard Lowther
1571	Alan Bellingham	Thomas Warcop
1572	Thomas Knyvet	Thomas Warcop
1584	Francis Clifford	Thomas Warcop
1586	Francis Clifford	Thomas Warcop
1588 (Oct)	Francis Dacre	Thomas Warcop
1593	Sir William Bowes	(Sir) Edward Denny
1597 (Sep)	(Sir) Walter Harcourt	Henry Cholmley
1601 (Oct)	George Wharton	Thomas Strickland
1604–1611	Sir Richard Musgrave	Sir Thomas Strickland
1614	Lord Clifford	Sir Thomas Wharton
1621	Lord Clifford	Sir Thomas Wharton
1624	Sir John Lowther	Robert Strickland
1625	Sir John Lowther	Sir Henry Bellingham
1626	Sir John Lowther	Sir Henry Bellingham
1628	Sir John Lowther	John Lowther
1629–1640	No Parliament summoned	

=== MPs 1640–1885 ===
Year	First member	First party	Second member	Second party
April 1640	Sir Philip Musgrave	Royalist	Sir Henry Bellingham	Royalist
November 1640	Sir Philip Musgrave	Royalist	Sir Henry Bellingham	Royalist
March 1643	Musgrave disabled to sit – seat vacant		Sir Henry Bellingham	Royalist
October 1645	Musgrave disabled to sit – seat vacant		Bellingham disabled to sit – seat vacant	
1646	Henry Lawrence		James Bellingham	
December 1648	Lawrence excluded in Pride's Purge – seat vacant		Bellingham not recorded as sitting after Pride's Purge	
1653	Westmorland was not separately represented in the Barebones Parliament. The following were nominated for The Four Northern Counties collectively: Major-General Charles Howard, Robert Fenwick, Henry Dawson, Henry Ogle			
1654	Jeremy Baynes		Christopher Lister	
1656	Thomas Burton		Christopher Lister	
January 1659	Thomas Burton		Thomas Wharton	
May 1659	Not represented in the restored Rump			
April 1660	Sir John Lowther		Sir Thomas Wharton	
1661	Sir Thomas Strickland		Sir Philip Musgrave	
1677	Sir John Lowther		Sir Philip Musgrave	
1678	Sir John Lowther		Alan Bellingham	
1679	Christopher Philipson		Alan Bellingham	
1681	Sir John Lowther		Alan Bellingham	
January 1689	Sir John Lowther		Henry Wharton	
December 1689	Sir John Lowther		Goodwin Wharton	Whig
1690	Sir John Lowther		Sir Christopher Musgrave	
1695	Sir John Lowther		Sir Richard Sandford	
1696	William Fleming		Sir Richard Sandford	
January 1701	Sir Christopher Musgrave		Henry Graham	
December 1701	Sir Richard Sandford		Henry Graham	
1702	Sir Christopher Musgrave		Henry Graham	
1704	William Fleming		Henry Graham	
1705	Robert Lowther		Henry Graham	
1707	Robert Lowther		Michael Fleming	
1708	Daniel Wilson		James Grahme	
1722	Anthony Lowther		James Grahme	
1727	Anthony Lowther		Daniel Wilson	
1741	Sir Philip Musgrave		Daniel Wilson	
1747	Edward Wilson		John Dalston	
1754	Sir George Dalston		John Dalston	
1759	Sir George Dalston		Robert Lowther	
1761	Sir James Lowther		John Upton	
1763	Robert Lowther		John Upton	
1764	John Robinson		John Upton	
1768	John Robinson		Thomas Fenwick	
1774	Sir James Lowther	Tory	Sir Michael le Fleming	Tory
1775	James Lowther	Tory	Sir Michael le Fleming	Tory
1806	James Lowther	Tory	The Lord Muncaster	Tory
1812	Henry Lowther	Tory	The Lord Muncaster	Tory
1813	Henry Lowther	Tory	Viscount Lowther	Tory
1831	Henry Lowther	Tory	Alexander Nowell	Whig
1832	Henry Lowther	Tory	Viscount Lowther	Tory
1834	Henry Lowther	Conservative	Viscount Lowther	Conservative
1841	Henry Lowther	Conservative	William Thompson	Conservative
1854	Henry Lowther	Conservative	Earl of Bective	Conservative
1868	William Lowther	Conservative	Earl of Bective	Conservative
1871	William Lowther	Conservative	Earl of Bective	Conservative

=== MPs 1918–1983 ===
Election	Member	Party
1918	John Weston	Coalition Conservative
1924	Oliver Stanley	Conservative
1945	William Fletcher-Vane	Conservative
1964	Michael Jopling	Conservative
1983	constituency abolished: see Westmorland and Lonsdale	

== Election results 1290–1885 ==
Election results taken from the History of Parliament Trust series.

=== Elections in the 18th century ===
General election 1715: Westmorland (2 seats)
Party	Candidate	Votes	%	±%
Nonpartisan	Daniel Wilson	Unopposed	N/A	N/A
Nonpartisan	James Grahme	Unopposed	N/A	N/A

General election 1722: Westmorland (2 seats)
Party	Candidate	Votes	%	±%
Nonpartisan	Anthony Lowther	Unopposed	N/A	N/A
Nonpartisan	James Grahme	Unopposed	N/A	N/A

- Lowther appointed a Commissioner of the Revenue in Ireland

By-Election 16 June 1726: Westmorland
Party	Candidate	Votes	%	±%
Nonpartisan	Anthony Lowther	Unopposed	N/A	N/A
Nonpartisan hold		Swing	N/A	

General election 1727: Westmorland (2 seats)
Party	Candidate	Votes	%	±%
Nonpartisan	Anthony Lowther	Unopposed	N/A	N/A
Nonpartisan	Daniel Wilson	Unopposed	N/A	N/A

General election 1734: Westmorland (2 seats)
Party	Candidate	Votes	%	±%
Nonpartisan	Anthony Lowther	Unopposed	N/A	N/A
Nonpartisan	Daniel Wilson	Unopposed	N/A	N/A

General election 28 May 1741: Westmorland (2 seats)
Party	Candidate	Votes	%	±%
Nonpartisan	Daniel Wilson	1,281	39.97	N/A
Nonpartisan	Philip Musgrave	1,079	33.67	N/A
Nonpartisan	John Dalston	845	26.37	N/A

General election 1747: Westmorland (2 seats)
Party	Candidate	Votes	%	±%
Nonpartisan	Edward Wilson	Unopposed	N/A	N/A
Nonpartisan	John Dalston	Unopposed	N/A	N/A

=== Elections in the 1830s ===
General election 1830: Westmorland
Party	Candidate	Votes	%
Tory	William Lowther	Unopposed	
Tory	Henry Lowther	Unopposed	
Registered electors		c. 3,500	
Tory hold			
Tory hold			

General election 1831: Westmorland
Party	Candidate	Votes	%
Tory	Henry Lowther	Unopposed	
Whig	Alexander Nowell (MP)	Unopposed	
Registered electors		c. 3,500	
Tory hold			
Whig gain from Tory			

General election 1832: Westmorland
Party	Candidate	Votes	%
Tory	William Lowther	2,052	36.6
Tory	Henry Lowther	1,948	34.7
Whig	John Barham	1,611	28.7
Majority		337	6.0
Turnout		3,584	81.6
Registered electors		4,392	
Tory hold			
Tory gain from Whig			

General election 1835: Westmorland
Party	Candidate	Votes	%
Conservative	William Lowther	Unopposed	
Conservative	Henry Lowther	Unopposed	
Registered electors		4,644	
Conservative hold			
Conservative hold			

General election 1837: Westmorland
Party	Candidate	Votes	%
Conservative	William Lowther	Unopposed	
Conservative	Henry Lowther	Unopposed	
Registered electors		4,775	
Conservative hold			
Conservative hold			

=== Elections in the 1840s ===
General election 1841: Westmorland
Party	Candidate	Votes	%	±%
Conservative	William Lowther	Unopposed		
Conservative	Henry Lowther	Unopposed		
Registered electors		4,384		
Conservative hold				
Conservative hold				

William Lowther was appointed Postmaster General of the United Kingdom and called to the House of Lords as Baron Lowther, causing a by-election.

By-election, 22 September 1841: Westmorland
Party	Candidate	Votes	%	±%
Conservative	William Thompson	Unopposed		
Conservative hold				

General election 1847: Westmorland
Party	Candidate	Votes	%	±%
Conservative	William Thompson	Unopposed		
Conservative	Henry Lowther	Unopposed		
Registered electors		4,078		
Conservative hold				
Conservative hold				

=== Elections in the 1850s ===
General election 1852: Westmorland
Party	Candidate	Votes	%	±%
Conservative	William Thompson	Unopposed		
Conservative	Henry Lowther	Unopposed		
Registered electors		4,062		
Conservative hold				
Conservative hold				

Thompson's death caused a by-election.

By-election, 31 March 1854: Westmorland
Party	Candidate	Votes	%	±%
Conservative	Thomas Taylour	Unopposed		
Conservative hold				

General election 1857: Westmorland
Party	Candidate	Votes	%	±%
Conservative	Thomas Taylour	Unopposed		
Conservative	Henry Lowther	Unopposed		
Registered electors		4,168		
Conservative hold				
Conservative hold				

General election 1859: Westmorland
Party	Candidate	Votes	%	±%
Conservative	Thomas Taylour	Unopposed		
Conservative	Henry Lowther	Unopposed		
Registered electors		4,214		
Conservative hold				
Conservative hold				

=== Elections in the 1860s ===
General election 1865: Westmorland
Party	Candidate	Votes	%	±%
Conservative	Thomas Taylour	Unopposed		
Conservative	Henry Lowther	Unopposed		
Registered electors		4,237		
Conservative hold				
Conservative hold				

Lowther's death caused a by-election.

By-election, 8 January 1868: Westmorland
Party	Candidate	Votes	%	±%
Conservative	William Lowther	Unopposed		
Conservative hold				

General election 1868: Westmorland
Party	Candidate	Votes	%	±%
Conservative	Thomas Taylour	Unopposed		
Conservative	William Lowther	Unopposed		
Registered electors		5,240		
Conservative hold				
Conservative hold				

=== Elections in the 1870s ===
Taylour succeeded to the peerage, becoming Marquess of Headfort and causing a by-election at which his son was elected unopposed.

By-election, 21 February 1871: Westmorland
Party	Candidate	Votes	%	±%
Conservative	Thomas Taylour	Unopposed		
Conservative hold				

General election 1874: Westmorland
Party	Candidate	Votes	%	±%
Conservative	Thomas Taylour	Unopposed		
Conservative	William Lowther	Unopposed		
Registered electors		5,177		
Conservative hold				
Conservative hold				

=== Elections in the 1880s ===
General election 1880: Westmorland
Party	Candidate	Votes	%	±%
Conservative	Thomas Taylour	2,641	37.1	N/A
Conservative	William Lowther	2,522	35.4	N/A
Liberal	Henry Tufton	1,963	27.5	New
Majority		559	7.9	N/A
Turnout		4,545 (est)	83.5 (est)	N/A
Registered electors		5,442		
Conservative hold				
Conservative hold				

== Election results 1918–1983 ==
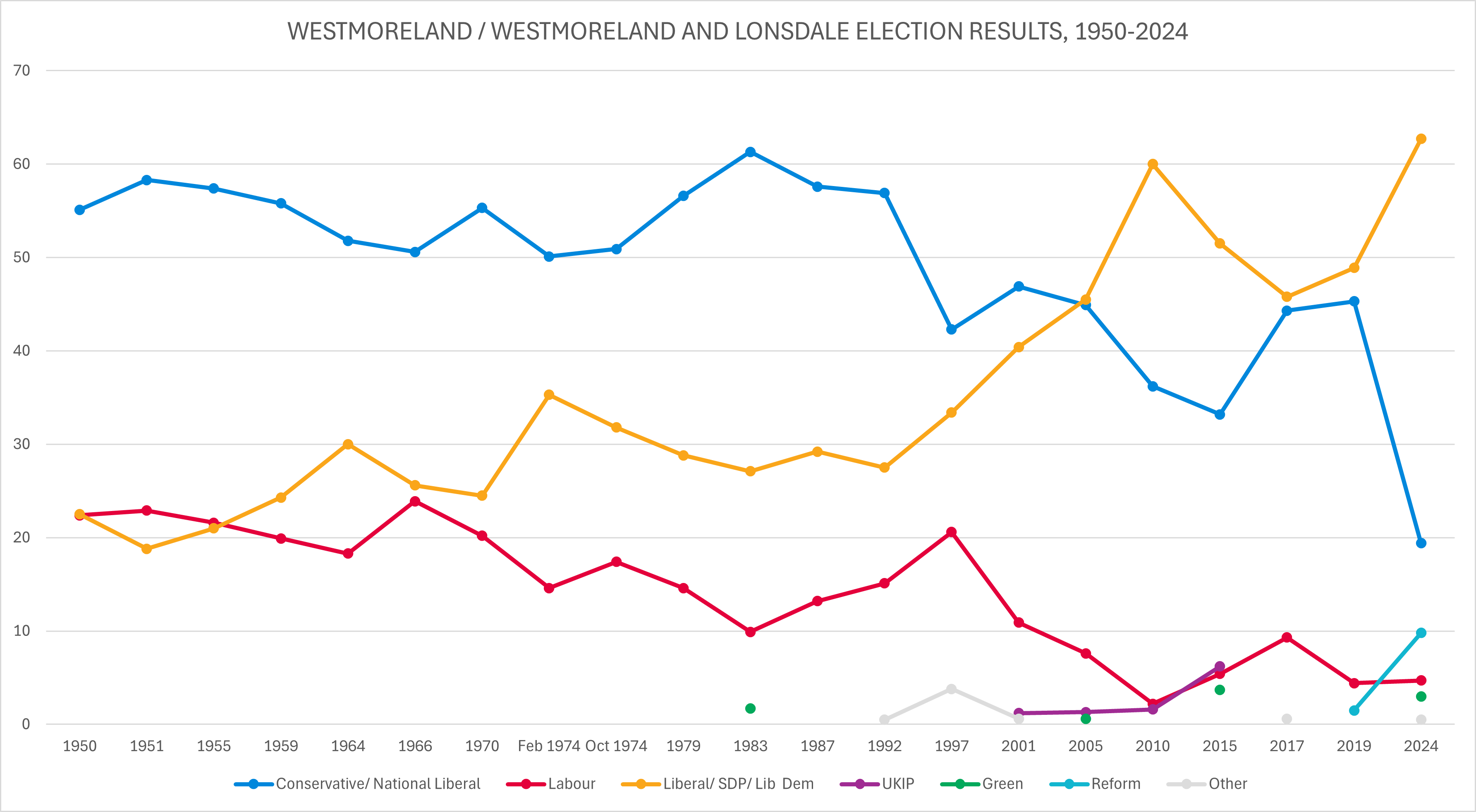
Election results 1950-2024

=== Elections in the 1910s ===
General election 1918: Westmorland
Party		Candidate	Votes	%	±%
C	Unionist	John Weston	Unopposed		
	Unionist win (new seat)				
C indicates candidate endorsed by the coalition government.

=== Elections in the 1920s ===
General election 1922: Westmorland
Party	Candidate	Votes	%	±%
Unionist	John Weston	Unopposed	N/A	N/A
Unionist hold				

General election 1923: Westmorland
Party	Candidate	Votes	%	±%
Unionist	John Weston	Unopposed	N/A	N/A
Unionist hold				

General election 1924: Westmorland
Party	Candidate	Votes	%	±%
Unionist	Oliver Stanley	17,935	71.2	N/A
Labour	Reginald Penrith Burnett	7,242	28.2	New
Majority		10,693	43.0	N/A
Turnout		25,177	80.2	N/A
Unionist hold		Swing	N/A	

General election 1929: Westmorland
Party	Candidate	Votes	%	±%
Unionist	Oliver Stanley	17,101	49.6	−21.6
Liberal	William Gretton Ward	13,223	38.3	New
Labour	W. Bone	4,184	12.1	−16.1
Majority		3,878	11.3	−31.7
Turnout		34,508	81.9	+1.7
Unionist hold		Swing		

=== Elections in the 1930s ===
General election 1931: Westmorland
Party	Candidate	Votes	%	±%
Conservative	Oliver Stanley	Unopposed	N/A	N/A
Conservative hold				

General election 1935: Westmorland
Party	Candidate	Votes	%	±%
Conservative	Oliver Stanley	22,634	68.5	N/A
Labour	E V Short	10,417	31.5	New
Majority		12,217	37.0	N/A
Turnout		33,051	73.8	N/A
Conservative hold		Swing	N/A	

General Election 1939/40

Another General Election was required to take place before the end of 1940. The political parties had been making preparations for an election to take place from 1939 and by the end of this year, the following candidates had been selected;

- Conservative: Oliver Stanley
- Labour: R S Armstrong
- Liberal: Geoffrey Acland

=== Elections in the 1940s ===
General election 1945: Westmorland
Party	Candidate	Votes	%	±%
Conservative	William Fletcher-Vane	19,717	53.3	−15.2
Labour	Harold Banning Richardson	9,674	26.1	−5.4
Liberal	Geoffrey Acland	7,313	19.8	New
Independent	Francis Basil Price-Heywood	306	0.8	New
Majority		10,043	27.1	−9.9
Turnout		37,010	77.0	+3.2
Conservative hold		Swing	−4.9	

=== Elections in the 1950s ===
General election 1950: Westmorland
Party	Candidate	Votes	%	±%
Conservative	William Fletcher-Vane	22,228	55.1	+1.8
Liberal	Geoffrey Acland	9,054	22.5	+2.7
Labour	Paul Wilson	9,031	22.4	−3.7
Majority		13,174	28.4	+1.3
Turnout		40,313	85.5	+8.5
Conservative hold		Swing	−0.5	

General election 1951: Westmorland
Party	Candidate	Votes	%	±%
Conservative	William Fletcher-Vane	23,227	58.3	+3.2
Labour	Paul Wilson	9,119	22.9	+0.5
Liberal	Geoffrey Acland	7,493	18.8	−3.7
Majority		14,108	35.4	+7.0
Turnout		39,839	83.5	+2.0
Conservative hold		Swing	+1.3	

General election 1955: Westmorland
Party	Candidate	Votes	%	±%
Conservative	William Fletcher-Vane	21,048	57.4	−0.9
Labour	Ivor Ralph Million	7,901	21.6	−1.3
Liberal	Geoffrey Acland	7,688	21.0	+2.2
Majority		13,147	35.8	+0.4
Turnout		36,637	77.6	−5.9
Conservative hold		Swing	+0.2	

General election 1959: Westmorland
Party	Candidate	Votes	%	±%
Conservative	William Fletcher-Vane	20,676	55.8	−1.6
Liberal	Geoffrey Acland	8,984	24.3	+3.3
Labour	Corin Hughes-Stanton	7,359	19.9	−1.7
Majority		11,692	31.5	−4.3
Turnout		37,019	78.8	+2.2
Conservative hold		Swing	−2.5	

=== Elections in the 1960s ===
General election 1964: Westmorland
Party	Candidate	Votes	%	±%
Conservative	Michael Jopling	19,125	51.75	
Liberal	Aubrey Herbert	11,078	29.98	
Labour	Norman Plamping	6,752	18.27	
Majority		8,047	21.77	
Turnout		36,955	78.82	
Conservative hold		Swing		

General election 1966: Westmorland
Party	Candidate	Votes	%	±%
Conservative	Michael Jopling	17,907	50.55	
Liberal	Alistair Bell	9,052	25.55	
Labour	John E Dayton	8,465	23.90	
Majority		8,855	25.00	
Turnout		35,424	75.46	
Conservative hold		Swing		

=== Elections in the 1970s ===
General election 1970: Westmorland
Party	Candidate	Votes	%	±%
Conservative	Michael Jopling	21,253	55.3	+4.8
Liberal	Gurney Pease	9,426	24.5	−1.0
Labour	Roger Ward	7,757	20.2	−3.7
Majority		11,827	30.8	+5.8
Turnout		38,436	71.0	−4.5
Conservative hold		Swing		

General election February 1974: Westmorland
Party	Candidate	Votes	%	±%
Conservative	Michael Jopling	22,036	50.13	
Liberal	A Nixon	15,502	35.27	
Labour	PJ Hildrew	6,419	14.60	
Majority		6,534	14.86	
Turnout		43,957	79.27	
Conservative hold		Swing		

General election October 1974: Westmorland
Party	Candidate	Votes	%	±%
Conservative	Michael Jopling	20,559	50.85	
Liberal	BN Wates	12,844	31.77	
Labour	M Taylor	7,028	17.38	
Majority		7,715	19.08	
Turnout		40,431	72.35	
Conservative hold		Swing		

General election 1979: Westmorland
Party	Candidate	Votes	%	±%
Conservative	Michael Jopling	25,274	56.62	
Liberal	K Hulls	12,867	28.83	
Labour	A Potts	6,497	14.55	
Majority		12,407	27.79	
Turnout		44,638	74.45	
Conservative hold		Swing		

== Sources ==
- D. Brunton & D. H. Pennington, Members of the Long Parliament (London: George Allen & Unwin, 1954)
- Cobbett's Parliamentary history of England, from the Norman Conquest in 1066 to the year 1803 (London: Thomas Hansard, 1808)
- F. W. S. Craig, British Parliamentary Election Results 1832–1885 (2nd edition, Aldershot: Parliamentary Research Services, 1989)
- F W S Craig, British Parliamentary Election Results 1918–1949 (Glasgow: Political Reference Publications, 1969)
- Maija Jansson (ed.), Proceedings in Parliament, 1614 (House of Commons) (Philadelphia: American Philosophical Society, 1988)
- Henry Stooks Smith, The Parliaments of England from 1715 to 1847 (2nd edition, edited by FWS Craig – Chichester: Parliamentary Reference Publications, 1973)
- Leigh Rayment's Historical List of MPs – Constituencies beginning with "W" (part 3)
