= Conybeare =

Conybeare or Coneybeare is a surname. Notable people with the surname include:

- Catherine Conybeare (born 1966), American philologist
- Charles Conybeare (disambiguation), multiple people
- Chris Conybeare, Australian public servant
- Florence Annie Conybeare (1872–1916), British suffragist
- Frederick Cornwallis Conybeare (1856–1924), British orientalist
- Henry Conybeare (1823–1892), British civil engineer and architect
- John Conybeare (1692–1755), British prelate and theologian
- John Josias Conybeare (1779–1824), British scholar
- John Josias Conybeare (1888–1967), English doctor, author of Conybeare's Textbook of Medicine
- L. Ted Coneybeare (1925–2012), Canadian television producer
- Rod Coneybeare (1930–2019), Canadian puppeteer, voice actor, and author
- William Conybeare (disambiguation), multiple people
