= Cropper (surname) =

Cropper is an English surname. Notable people with the surname include:

- Angela Cropper (1946–2012), United Nations official from Trinidad and Tobago
- Anna Cropper (1938–2007), British stage and television actress
- Dene Cropper (born 1983), English former professional footballer
- Elizabeth Cropper (born 1944), British-born art historian
- Hilary Cropper (1941–2004), English businesswoman
- James Cropper (abolitionist) (1773–1840), English businessman, philanthropist, and abolitionist
- James Cropper (politician) (1823–1900), English Liberal politician and papermaker.great-great-grandfather of James (businessman)
- James Cropper (priest) (1862–1938), Anglican priest
- James Cropper (businessman) (born 1938), English businessman, great-great-grandson of James (politician)
- Jason Cropper (born 1971), American musician, guitarist for Weezer
- John Cropper (1797–1876), British philanthropist
- Linda Cropper, Australian television actress
- Mark Cropper, British businessman, son of James (politician)
- Peter Cropper (1945–2015), British violinist, leader of the Lindsay String Quartet
- Steve Cropper (1941–2025), American guitarist, songwriter and producer
- William Cropper (1862–1889), English cricketer and footballer

Fictional characters include:

- Hayley Cropper, in the British soap opera Coronation Street
- Roy Cropper, in Coronation Street
