= James Cropper =

James Cropper may refer to:

- James Cropper (abolitionist) (1773–1840), English businessman in Liverpool and philanthropist
- James Cropper (politician) (1823–1900), British politician
- James Cropper (priest) (1862–1938), British Anglican clergyman
- Sir James Cropper (businessman) (born 1938), British paper manufacturer and Lord-Lieutenant of Cumbria
- James Cropper plc, English papermaking company
