= William Conybeare (Provost of Southwell) =

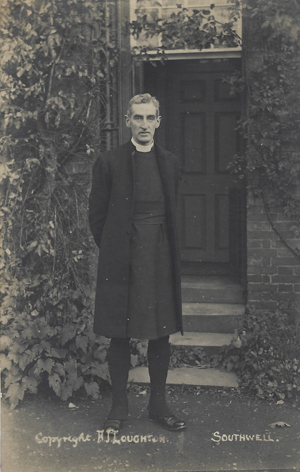
The Very Rev William James Conybeare

Very Rev. William James Conybeare (19 December 1871 – 13 May 1955) was an Anglican priest in the first half of the 20th century.

William James Conybeare was born in 1871 into a prominent Anglican family descended from John Conybeare (1692–1755), Bishop of Bristol. He was the son of Rev. John William Edward Conybeare, Vicar of Barrington, Cambridgeshire, and Frances Anne (née Cropper). His grandfathers were the author William John Conybeare, and the politician James Cropper. The clergyman and geologist William Daniel Conybeare and John Cropper were his great-grandfathers. John Saul Howson, Dean of Chester and the engineer Henry Conybeare were his great-uncle, and his cousins included George Howson, Archdeacon of Liverpool; and James Howson, Archdeacon of Craven.

He was educated at Eton and Trinity College, Cambridge.

Ordained in 1898, he was Domestic Chaplain to successive Archbishops of Canterbury then Head of the Cambridge House Lay Settlement, Camberwell. In 1909 he became Rector of Newington and in 1916 Rector of Southwell Minster and Archdeacon of Nottingham. In time he became the first Provost of Southwell, a post he held from 1931 to 1945.

== Notes ==
Church of England titles
Preceded by Inaugural appointment	Provost of Southwell Minster; 1931–1945	Succeeded by Hugh Christopher Lempriere Heywood
