= Cropper =

Cropper may refer to:

== Places ==
- Cropper, Kentucky, an unincorporated community, United States
- Cropper, Derbyshire, a hamlet in the parish of Osleston and Thurvaston
- Camp Cropper, a detention site near Baghdad, Iraq

== Other uses ==
- Cropper (surname), a list of people and fictional characters
- A piece of agricultural machinery used to mow grass or crop wheat
- Cropper (pigeon breed)
- James Cropper plc, an English papermaking company
- An icon in Adobe Photoshop used to crop images

== See also ==
- Share cropper
