= William Conybeare =

William Conybeare may refer to:

- William Conybeare (geologist) (1787–1857), English geologist
- William Conybeare (author) (1815–1857), English author, his son
- William Conybeare (Provost of Southwell) (1871–1955), English priest
