= St Mary's Church, Itchen Stoke =

Coordinates: 51.0884°N 1.2031°W

St Mary, Itchen Stoke
- St Mary's Church, Itchen Stoke, Hampshire
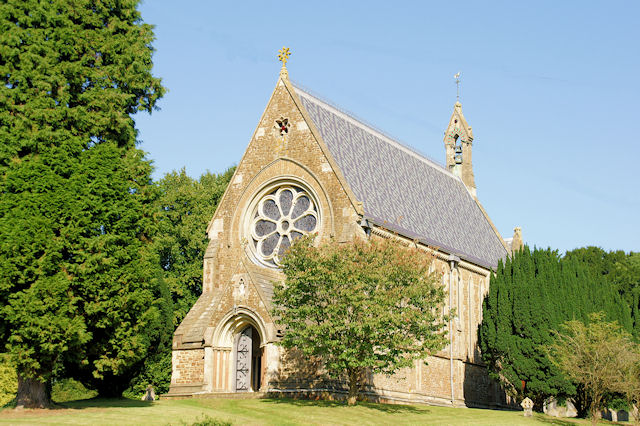
- The church of St Mary seen from the west

- Location in Hampshire
- OS grid reference: SU 55912 32422
- Location: Itchen Stoke, Hampshire
- Country: England
- Denomination: Anglican

History
- Founded: 1866
- Founder: Rev. Charles Conybeare
- Dedication: Saint Mary
- Dedicated: 1866
- Consecrated: 1866

Architecture
- Functional status: Redundant
- Heritage designation: Grade II*
- Designated: 1 March 1972
- Architect: Henry Conybeare
- Architectural type: Church
- Style: Gothic revival
- Groundbreaking: 1866
- Completed: 1866
- Construction cost: £7,000

Specifications
- Materials: brown and grey stone, slate roof

St Mary, Itchen Stoke, Hampshire, is a redundant Anglican church in the parish of Itchen Stoke and Ovington. It has been designated by English Heritage as a Grade II* listed building, and is under the care of the Churches Conservation Trust.

== History ==
St Mary is the third church to have been built in the village of Itchen Stoke. The first was built before 1270 on a site near the River Itchen, but it suffered from damp, became dilapidated and was pulled down around 1830. Some traces of it remain. The second church which replaced it was built on land in the centre of the village which was donated for the purpose by Lord Ashburton, who held the advowson. Charles Ranken Conybeare, son of the geologist William Daniel Conybeare, became the incumbent in April 1857, but he took a dislike to the church, complaining that it was cold and damp, and that remedying these defects would be more expensive than demolishing and replacing it. Consent for the demolition was given by the Bishop of Winchester and the new Lord Ashburton, and the present church was erected on the same site in 1866.

The architect of the new church was Charles Conybeare's younger brother Henry Conybeare, a civil engineer with an interest in Gothic architecture, who had designed the Afghan Church in Colaba, Mumbai, where he had also been responsible for improving the city's sanitation.

== Architecture ==
Sir Nikolaus Pevsner described St Mary as "serious and impressive" and "quite a remarkable church for its date". It is approached by a steep path up from the main road and the design was clearly influenced by the Sainte Chapelle in Paris.

=== Exterior ===
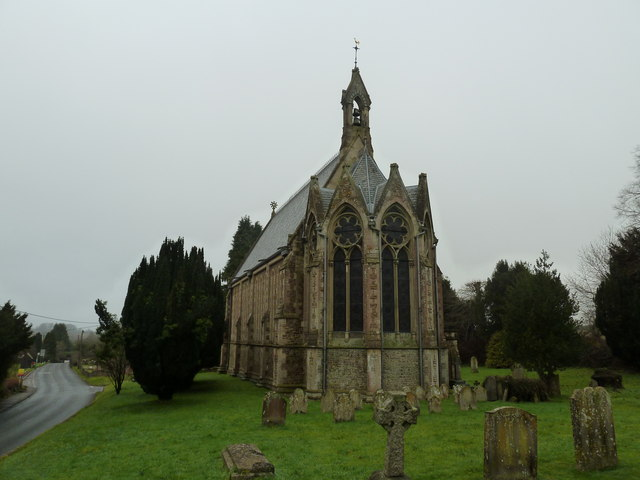
St Mary seen from the east

The church is of brown and grey rubble stone with limestone dressings. Above the west entrance door is a rose window, given by Lady Ashburton in memory of her husband. At the east end is a polygonal apse, whose gables have two-light bar tracery windows. There are four sets of three tall lancet windows in the side walls of the church. The steep roof is of purple and grey-green slates in a diamond-shaped pattern. There is a belfry with two bells between the nave and the chancel.

=== Interior ===
The west door opens into a wide vestibule in three compartments with a vaulted stone roof. It contains a stone font recovered from the previous church. Beyond it is the tall nave divided into bays by wall columns. It has a timber roof.

The chancel/apse is semi-octagonal with moulded ribs and wall columns. It has a vaulted stone roof. The five long arched windows of two lights with small rose windows contain little pieces of clear, red, blue and green glass arranged in geometrical patterns. The circular floor is covered with glazed brown and green tiles laid out in the form of a labyrinth, as in Chartres Cathedral.

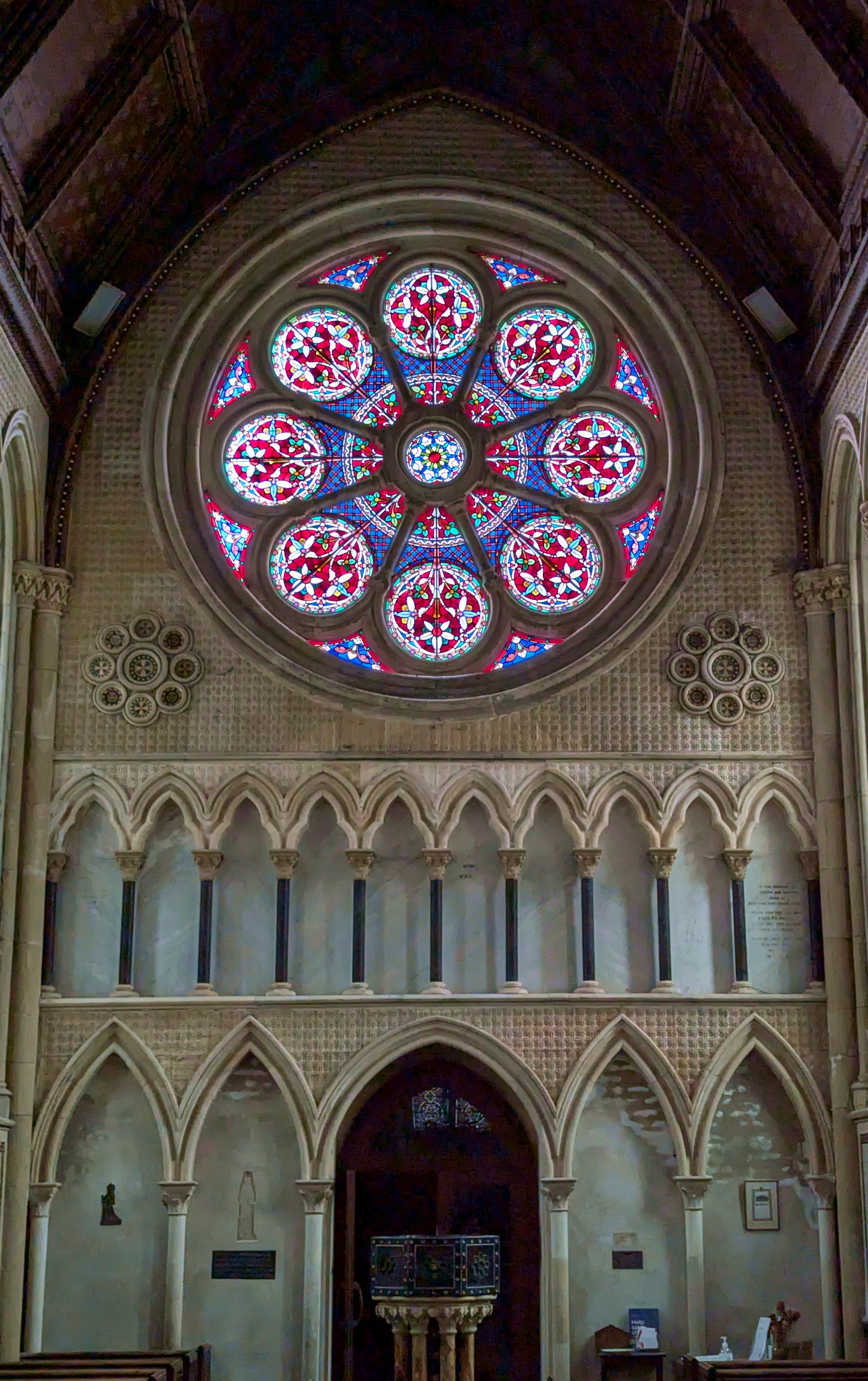
The rose window of St. Mary's church, at Itchen Stoke, Hampshire, England. September 2024.

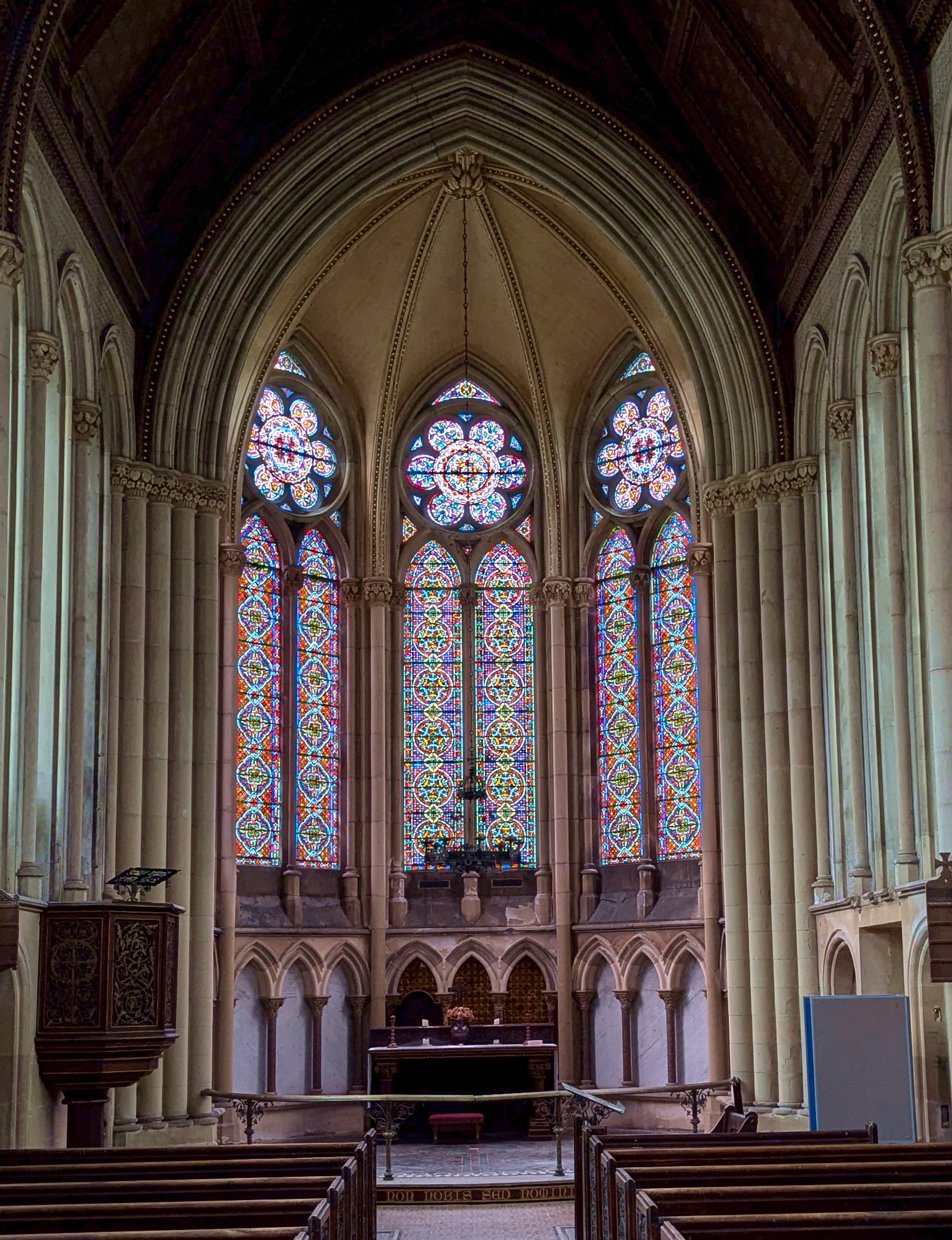
The apse of St. Mary's church, Itchen Stoke, Hampshire, England. September 2024.

The furnishings, contemporary with the church, include:

- a font of coloured vitreous enamel, gilt bronze and black Californian marble, based on the tomb of Mary of Burgundy in the Church of Our Lady, Bruges.
- a pulpit with five recessed panels filled with cast iron scrollwork and foliage
- pews with ends similar to the panels of the pulpit.

== See also ==
- List of churches preserved by the Churches Conservation Trust in South East England
