= Itchen Stoke and Ovington =

Civil parish in Hampshire, England

Coordinates: 51.0881°N 1.2026°W

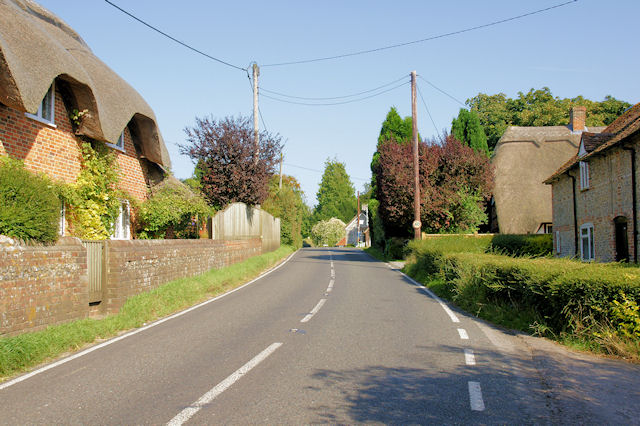
- Cottages at Itchen Stoke

- Location within Hampshire
- Population: 373; 216 (2011 Census)
- OS grid reference: SU5594132397
- Civil parish: Itchen Stoke and Ovington
- District: Winchester
- Shire county: Hampshire
- Region: South East
- Country: England
- Sovereign state: United Kingdom
- Post town: ALRESFORD
- Postcode district: SO24
- Dialling code: 01962
- Police: Hampshire and Isle of Wight
- Fire: Hampshire and Isle of Wight
- Ambulance: South Central
- UK Parliament: Winchester

Itchen Stoke and Ovington (/ˈɒvɪŋtən/) is a civil parish consisting of two adjoining villages in the Winchester district, in Hampshire, England, 2 miles (3.2 km) west of Alresford town centre in the valley of the River Itchen, 5 miles (8.0 km) north-east of Winchester, and 2 miles (3.2 km) south-east of Itchen Abbas.

== Itchen Stoke ==
The village population is 210, including Abbotstone. Its most notable building is the Church of St Mary, a redundant Anglican church built by the civil engineer and architect Henry Conybeare in 1856, now under the care of the Churches Conservation Trust. It is in an early French style, Grade II* listed and made of brown and grey rubble stone with limestone dressings.

=== History ===
The manor of Itchen Stoke was granted to the Bishop of Winchester by King Edgar in 960. The Domesday Book records the manor as having passed to Romsey Abbey, which retained it until the Dissolution of the Monasteries. It then passed to Sir William Paulet, later the first Marquess of Winchester and stayed with his family until the time of the Commonwealth. Itchen Stoke Mill (with an attached miller's cottage) is of ancient origin. The current building dates from the 18th century and straddles the mill race. Itchen Stoke House is 19th century, has nine bays and is central with small grounds; this being the former rectory.

=== Abbotstone ===
This outlying north-east hamlet of a few houses has a population of 32. It was formerly in its own civil parish and lies along the Ellisfield to Itchen Abbas portion of the Three Castles Path Abbotstone contains an abandoned medieval village, with further details at the charity English Heritage's website and evidence of fortifications, as well as several abandoned quarries.

The traveller Celia Fiennes, who made extensive tours riding side-saddle, passed through "Aberstone" in 1691. She noticed the house of the Duke of Bolton "which stands on the side of a hill where are fine Gardens and much fruite."

== Ovington ==
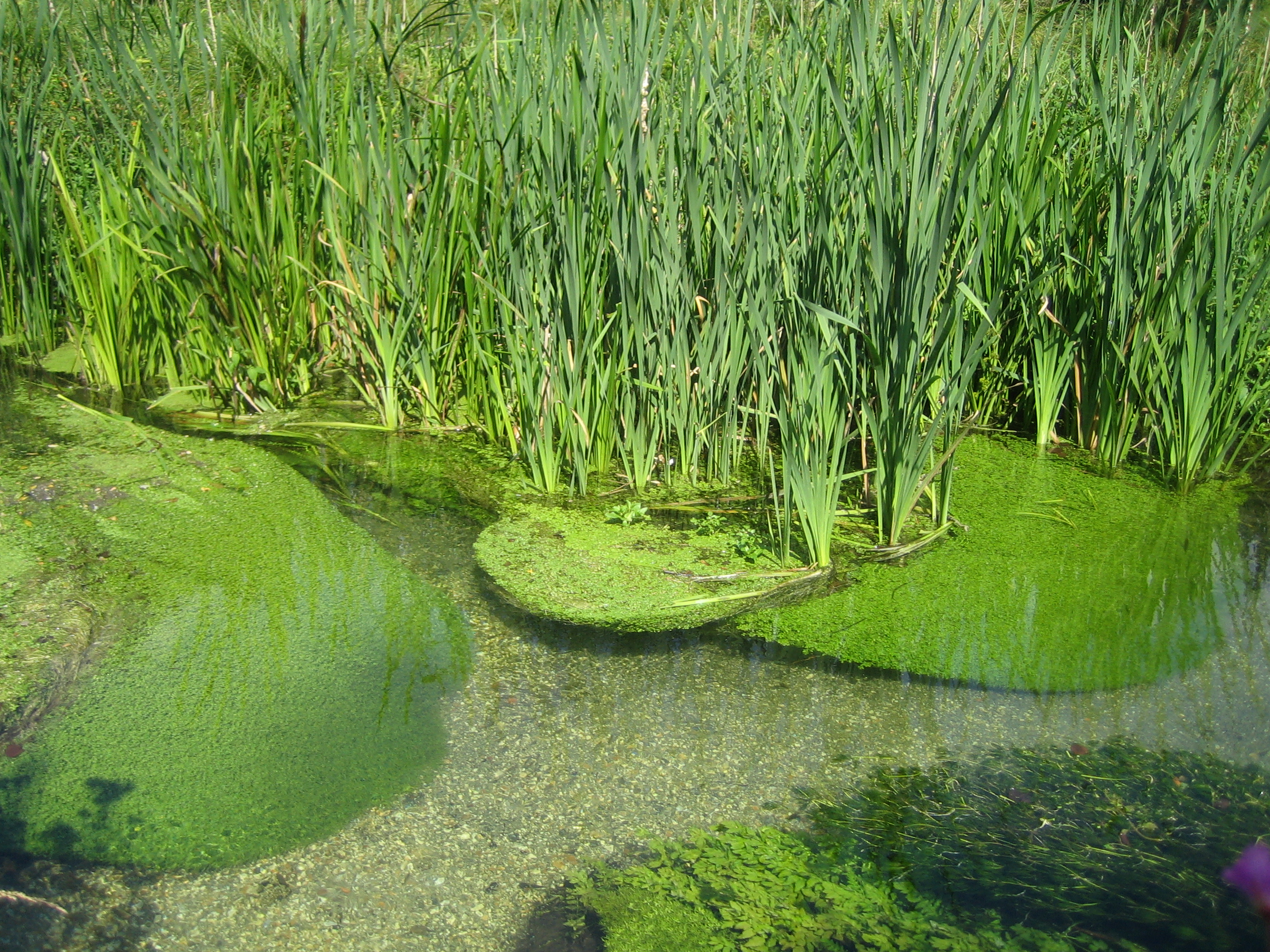
River Itchen, Ovington

The village on the opposite south bank, of the River Itchen, known upstream as the River Alre in New Alresford and Old Alresford, has a population of 163 and several homes, including an Old Rectory. Its largest building in the central area is Ovington House, of no great antiquity, but its North Lodge is listed as Grade II. There is a pub, the Bush Inn.

Its church is dedicated to St Peter and is Grade II listed.

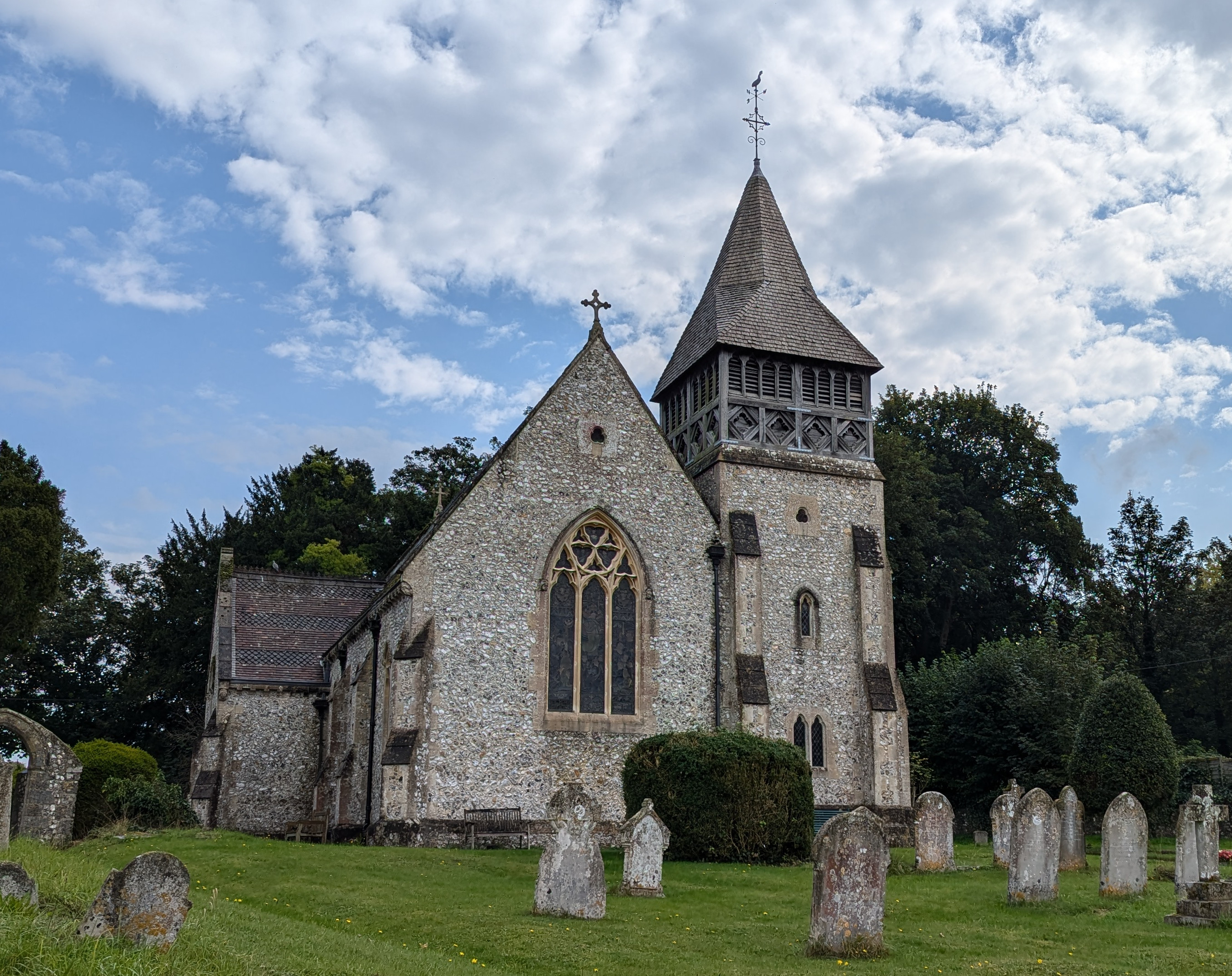
The church of St. Peter, at Ovington, Hampshire, England. September 2024.

Extending to the far south into the South Downs National Park, the parish reaches a Scheduled ancient rectangular enclosure.

=== History ===
The name appears in the Domesday Book as "Ofinetune", which means "the place above" in Old English.

The revenues from the manor at Ovington supported Itchen's nuns until 1284 when it was sold to the monks of St. Swithun's Priory, Winchester Cathedral. On the Dissolution of the monasteries (1534–61), it was transferred to the newly formed Dean and Chapter of the cathedral. The manorial rights were disputed in 1855–59 between the Baroness van Zandt and the Bishop of Winchester. After this was resolved, it became the property of the Hewson family.

The artist Fred Appleyard lived in Itchen Stoke. There is a major retrospective of his work in the Arc Winchester in Summer 2024, including many paintings from Itchen Stoke and Itchen valley.
