= Conybeare's Textbook of Medicine =

Medical textbook

Conybeare's Textbook of Medicine is a medical textbook. The first edition was published in 1929 and it reached its fifteenth edition in 1970, causing a reviewer to state the review was "superfluous". Another review stated it was "old-fashioned and readable...well written".

The doctor for whom the text is named is John Josias Conybeare, son of Frederick Cornwallis Conybeare. He was on the staff of Guy's Hospital from which he retired in 1953, and died in 1967.
