= Charles Conybeare =

Charles Conybeare may refer to:

- Charles Conybeare (Liberal politician) (1853–1919), English barrister and politician
- Charles F. P. Conybeare (1860–1927), lawyer, businessman and author of poetry in British Columbia, Canada
