= Charles F. P. Conybeare =

Canadian lawyer, businessman and poet

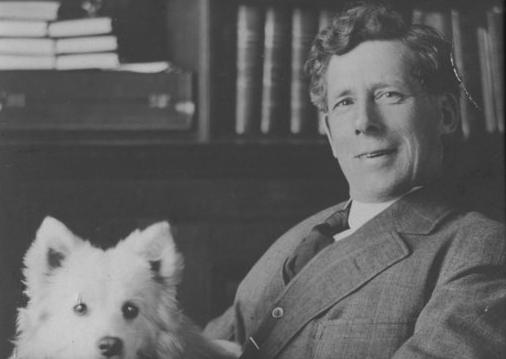
Charles Frederick Pringle Conybeare

Charles Frederick Pringle Conybeare QC (May 19, 1860 – July 30, 1927) was a lawyer, businessman and author of poetry in Alberta, Canada.

== Early life ==
He was born in Little Sutton House, Chiswick, London, the son of Henry Conybeare and Anne Newport Moore, and the grandson of William Daniel Conybeare. He was educated in England at Westminster School in London and Christ Church, Oxford. He joined the British merchant marine in 1875 but was discharged because he was nearsighted. Conybeare came to Canada, moving to Winnipeg in 1880, where he articled in law. In 1885, he moved to Lethbridge, Alberta, where he was called to the bar for the Northwest Territories and set up a law practice, becoming the town's first lawyer. He was named a notary the following year. From 1888 to 1897, he served as crown prosecutor.

== Political career ==
Conybeare ran for a seat to the Legislative Assembly of the Northwest Territories in a by-election held in the Macleod electoral district on September 5, 1887. He was defeated by Frederick Haultain, who went on to become premier.

== Personal life ==
Conybeare married Ida Attwood in 1890. They had two daughters: Ethel Ellen, and Elaine. In 1894, he was named Queen's Counsel. His partners William Alfred Galliher and William Carlos Ives both became politicians and judges. Conybeare was founding vice-president for the Law Society of Alberta in 1907. He served as solicitor for the town of Lethbridge, the Bank of Montreal, the Canadian Pacific Railway and other companies operating in the region, and the Anglican Diocese of Calgary.

As well as belonging to a number of prominent local clubs, he helped found the Chinook Club and Pemmican Club in Lethbridge. He helped establish Lethbridge Brewing and Malting, British Canadian Trust and Lethbridge Brick and Terra Cotta. He was also a promoter of the Bank of Winnipeg. Conybeare was chairman of the public school board, president of the Lethbridge Board of Trade and Civic Committee and founding president of the Southern Alberta Boards of Trade.

== Death and legacy ==
He died in Lethbridge at the age of 67.

Conybeare published two books of poetry:

- Vahnfried (London, 1903)
- Lyrics from the west (Toronto, 1907)
