= John Cropper =

English philanthropist and abolitionist

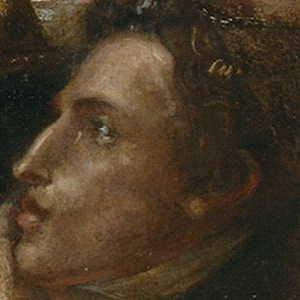
- Cropper in 1840.
- Born: 1797
- Died: 1874 (aged 76–77)
- Occupation: Shipping magnate
- Spouse: Mary
- Parent: James Cropper

John Cropper (1797–1874) was an English philanthropist and abolitionist. A businessman, he was known as "the most generous man in Liverpool".

== Business and philanthropy ==
Cropper was renowned for being rich, but also being generous. It is said that a letter addressed to "the most generous man in Liverpool" ended up on his desk. Every year he and his wife would entertain juvenile delinquents who were serving their sentences at the training ship "Akbar". Cropper would also hold a bible class every Sunday at a home the family had set up for "fallen girls." This was in addition to the ragged school they set up for local pauper's children. This school was known as "St. Croppers" and is likely to be the one referred to in the poem below.

In 1836, his father's partner, Robert Rathbone Benson (known as "Robert R"), had resigned membership from the Quakers. This was no small affair as the Quaker church was the centre of its members community. Benson was involved with, and related to, Isaac Crewdson (a leader to the Manchester Quaker meeting). Crewdson had written and published a book in January 1835 called A Beacon to the Society of Friends. The controversy it ignited, which related to the role of evangelism in the Society, eventually led to the resignation of Crewdson and about 300 similarly minded people across the country. Benson moved to Manchester.

It was because of this internal controversy that on 31 January 1838, John Cropper's father James Cropper ended the partnership of Cropper, Benson & Co. which had made the family rich and wealthy. His father wanted to direct his energies to philanthropic interests and his two sons, John and Edward, had agreed.

In 1840, John Cropper journeyed to London to attend the World's anti-slavery convention on 12 June 1840. The picture above shows him in a painting made to commemorate the event which attracted delegates from America, France, Haiti, Australia, Ireland, Jamaica and Barbados.

Cropper joined the committee of the Liverpool City Mission and served as its President from 1847 to 1874.

In 1853 Harriet Beecher Stowe visited England and stayed first at John Cropper's house, Dingle Bank. On 23 September 1853 Cropper's third son, John Wakefield Cropper, married Susanna Elizabeth Lydia Arnold. Susanna was third daughter of the late Dr Arnold of Rugby School

== Family ==
Cropper was born to James and Mary Cropper in 1797. Cropper married Anne Wakefield and they had ten children. Mary (1821-1885) married John Saul Howson; James (1823-1900) founded the paper mill company which eventually became James Cropper plc in 1845 and was a Liberal MP for Kendal; Sarah (1824-1890); Anne (born 1825); John Wakefield (1828-1829); John Wakefield (1830-1892); Isabella (1831-1831); Edward William (born 1833); Isabella Eliza (born 1835); Margaret (born 1836).

== Poem ==
A poem was written about John Cropper by Edward Lear

Dingle Bank
He lived at Dingle Bank - he did; -
He lived at Dingle Bank;
And in his garden was one Quail,
Four tulips and a Tank:
And from his window he could see
The otion and the River Dee.

His house stood on a Cliff, - it did,
Its aspic it was cool;
And many thousand little boys
Resorted to his school,
Where if of progress they could boast
He gave them heaps of buttered toast.
But he grew rabid-wroth, he did,
If they neglected books,
And dragged them to adjacent Cliffs
With beastly Button Hooks,
And there with fatuous glee he threw
Them down into the otion blue.

And in the sea they sway, they did, -
All playfully about,
And some eventually became
Sponges, or speckled trout: -
But Liverpool doth all bewail
Their Fate; - likewise his Garden Quail.
