= James Cropper (businessman) =

English businessman (born 1938)

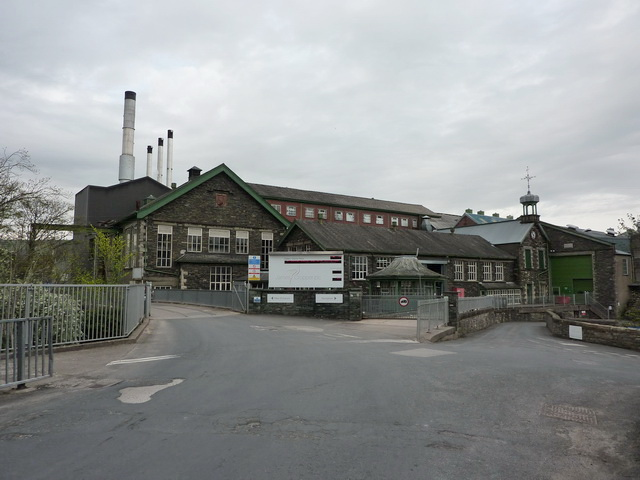
James Cropper paper mill in Burneside

Sir James Anthony Cropper KCVO (born 22 December 1938) is the former Lord-Lieutenant of Cumbria and honorary president of James Cropper plc, speciality paper makers, of Burneside, a business founded by his great-great grandfather James Cropper in 1845.

He was educated at Eton College and Magdalene College, Cambridge (BA, 1962).

He served as High Sheriff of Westmorland for 1971.

He was appointed Knight Commander of the Royal Victorian Order (KCVO) in the 2011 New Years Honours List.
