= John Josias Conybeare =

British scholar (1779–1824)

John Josias Conybeare (1779–1824), the elder brother of William Daniel Conybeare, was a scholar of Anglo-Saxon.

He was an accomplished scholar, and studied at Christ Church, Oxford. He became vicar of Batheaston, and was Rawlinsonian Professor of Anglo-Saxon (1808–1812), and afterwards Professor of Poetry (1812–1821), at the University of Oxford.

== Works ==
He published a translation of Beowulf in English and Latin verse (1814), but is particularly noted for his posthumously published 1826 Illustrations of Anglo-Saxon Poetry.

Like his brother, he was a student of geology and communicated papers to the Annals of Philosophy and the Transactions of the Geological Society of London (Obituary in Ann. Phil. vol. viii., Sept. 1824, p. 162.)

He gave the Bampton Lectures at Oxford in 1824. These were published posthumously (also in 1824) as An attempt to trace the History and ascertain the Limits of the Secondary and Spiritual Interpretation of Scripture.
