= James Cropper (politician) =

English politician (1823–1900)

A portrait of James Cropper

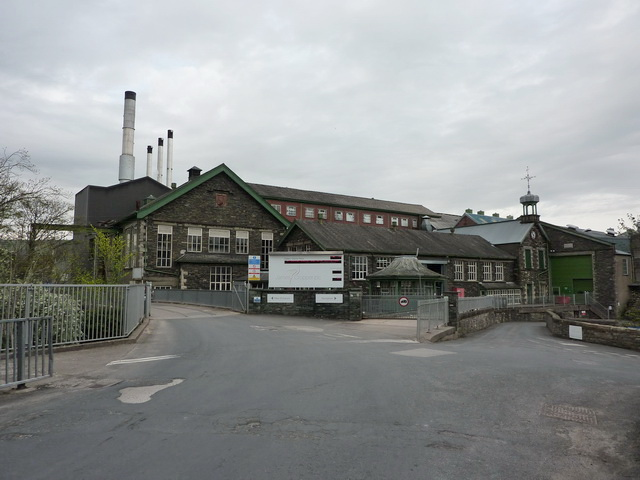
James Cropper paper mill in Burneside

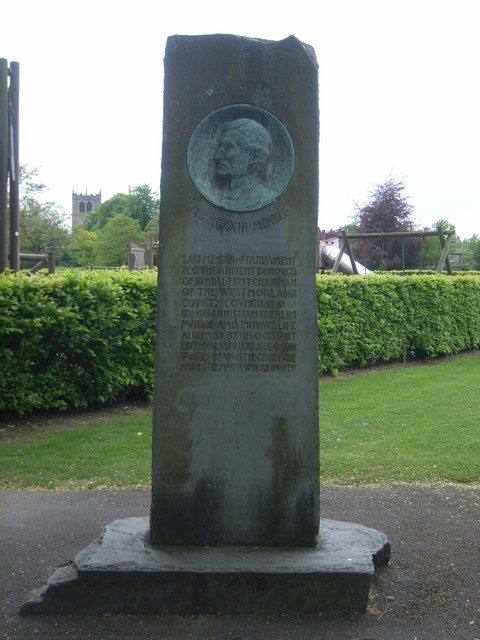
A monument to James Cropper in Kendal

James Cropper (22 February 1823 – 16 October 1900) was an English Liberal politician who sat in the House of Commons from 1880 to 1885, and the founder of James Cropper plc.

Cropper was the son of James Cropper of Dingle Bank Liverpool. His father was the philanthropist and slavery abolitionist John Cropper, and his grandfather was James Cropper. He was educated at the Liverpool Royal Institution and the University of Edinburgh. He married Ann Wakefield, the daughter of James Wakefield of Kendal. He founded the paper mill company which eventually became James Cropper plc in 1845. He was a J.P. and Deputy Lieutenant for Westmorland and was High Sheriff of Westmorland in 1875.

Cropper was elected Member of Parliament for Kendal at a by-election in December 1880. He held the seat until the 1885 general election, when the parliamentary borough of Kendal was abolished, and the name transferred to a new division of the county of Westmorland. In the enlarged constituency, Cropper was defeated by the Earl of Bective, a Conservative who had previously been one of the two MPs for the undivided Westmorland constituency.

== Family ==
Cropper married Fanny Alison Wakefield in 1845, and they were the parents of ten children.

- Frances Anne Cropper married Rev. John William Edward Conybeare, son of William Conybeare.
  - William James Conybeare.
- Charles James Cropper married Hon. Edith Emily Holland, daughter of Henry Holland, 1st Viscount Knutsford.
  - Eleanor Margaret married Francis Dyke Acland, 14th Baronet.
  - James Winstanley Cropper (1879 - 1956) married, Marjorie Constance Bagot, daughter of Josceline Bagot and Theodosia Bagot of Levens Hall.
  - Mary Frances Cropper married Sir Walter Morley Fletcher.

Cropper died at the age of 77.

Parliament of the United Kingdom
Preceded by George Glyn	Member of Parliament for Kendal; 1880 – 1885	Succeeded by Earl of Bective
