= William Conybeare (author) =

English vicar, essayist and novelist

William John Conybeare (1 August 1815 – 23 July 1857) was an English vicar, essayist and novelist who was the first Principal of Liverpool College.

== Biography ==
William John Conybeare was the son of Dean William Daniel Conybeare. He attended Westminster School, where he formed a life-long friendship with George Cotton, later Bishop of Calcutta. He matriculated at Trinity College, Cambridge in 1833, where he was elected fellow in 1837.

From 1842 to 1848 Conybeare was principal of the Liverpool Collegiate Institution (later Liverpool College). There, he worked with John Saul Howson, with whom he would later publish Perversion: or, the Causes and Consequences of Infidelity. Whilst in Liverpool, he campaigned for the improvement of middle-class education in the city.

With his health deteriorating, Conybeare resigned his position at Liverpool in 1848 and moved to Axminster, Devon, to become vicar. He served there until 1854, when he moved to Weybridge, Surrey, where his brother-in-law, Edward Rose, was the parish priest. He died of tuberculosis in Weybridge in 1857, and is buried in Brompton Cemetery, London. He was survived by his wife, Eliza Rose (1820-1903), and his son, John William Edward Conybeare. Eliza was granddaughter of Thomas Babington. His Daughter Grace Mary Conybeare married George Campbell Macaulay. His son John married Frances Anne Cropper, daughter of James Cropper.

== Publications ==
Conybeare published Essays, Ecclesiastical and Social (1855), and a novel, Perversion: or, the Causes and Consequences of Infidelity (1856), but is best known as the joint author (along with John Saul Howson) of The Life and Epistles of St Paul (1852, 2nd ed. 1856).

He published Church Parties, a 30,000 word essay on the different styles of churchmanship found within the Anglican Church, in 1855.
