= William Conybeare (geologist) =

English geologist (1787–1857)

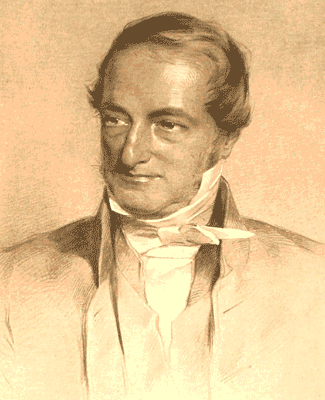
- William Conybeare
- Born: William Daniel Conybeare; 7 June 1787; London
- Died: 12 August 1857 (aged 70); Itchen Stoke, Hampshire, England
- Awards: Wollaston medal (1844)
- Scientific career
- Fields: Geology

William Daniel Conybeare FRS (7 June 1787 – 12 August 1857), dean of Llandaff, was an English geologist, palaeontologist and clergyman. He is probably best known for his ground-breaking work on fossils and excavation in the 1820s, including important papers for the Geological Society of London on ichthyosaur anatomy and the first published scientific description of a plesiosaur.

== Life and career ==
=== Childhood and education ===
He was a grandson of John Conybeare, bishop of Bristol (1692–1755), a notable preacher and divine, and son of Dr William Conybeare, rector of St Botolph-without-Bishopsgate. Born in London, he was educated there at Westminster School, then went in 1805 to Christ Church, Oxford, where in 1808 he took his degree of BA, with a first in classics and second in mathematics, and proceeded to MA three years later.

=== Early career ===
Having entered holy orders he became in 1814 curate of Wardington, near Banbury, and he accepted also a lectureship at Brislington near Bristol. During this period he was one of the founders of the Bristol Philosophical Institution (1822). He was rector of Sully in Glamorganshire from 1823 to 1836, and vicar of Axminster from 1836 to 1844. He was appointed Bampton lecturer in 1839, called and later published in a book as An Analytical Examination into the Character, Value, and Just Application of the Writings of the Christian Fathers During the Ante Nicene Period. He was instituted to the deanery of Llandaff in 1845.

=== Geology ===
Attracted to the study of geology by the lectures of John Kidd he pursued the subject with ardour. As soon as he had left college he made extended journeys in Britain and on the continent, and he became one of the early members of The Geological Society. Both William Buckland and Adam Sedgwick acknowledged their indebtedness to him for instruction received when they first began to devote attention to geology.

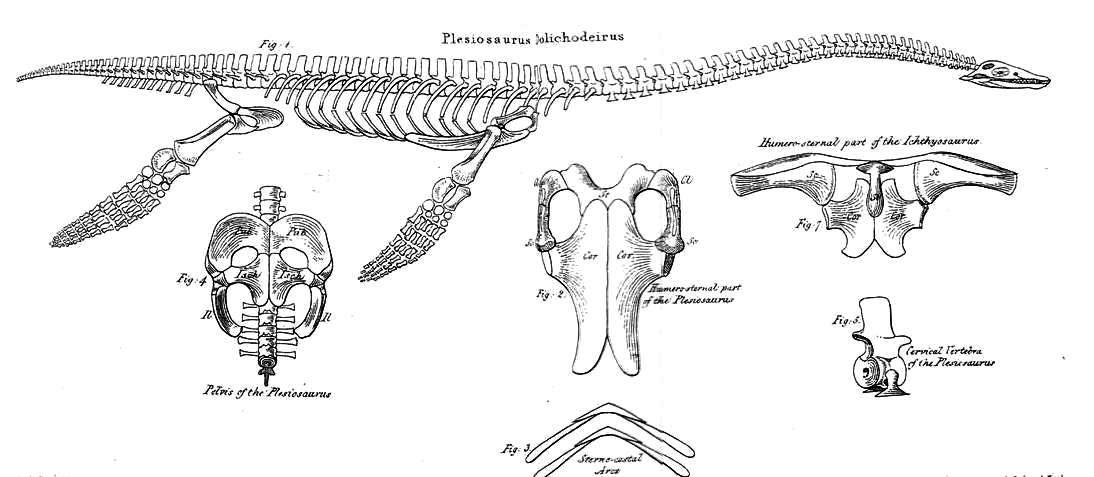
Illustration of plesiosaur skeletal anatomy from Conybeare's 1824 paper describing the skeleton found by Anning

He contributed geological memoirs to the Transactions of the Geological Society, the Annals of Philosophy, and the Philosophical Magazine. In 1821, in collaboration with Henry De la Beche he distinguished himself by describing, from fragmentary remains, the saurian Plesiosaurus in a paper for the Geological that also contained an important description and analysis of all that had been learned to that point about the anatomy of ichthyosaurs including the fact that there had been at least three different species. His predictions about the plesiosaur were proved correct by the discovery of a nearly complete skeleton by Mary Anning in 1823, which Conybeare described to the Geological Society in 1824. Among his most important memoirs is that on the south-western coal district of England, written in conjunction with Dr Buckland, and published in 1824.

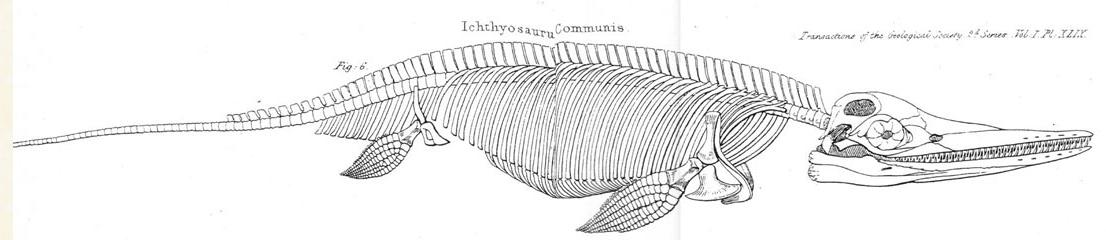
Diagram of the skeletal anatomy of an Ichthyosaur from an 1824 paper by Conybeare

He wrote also on the valley of the Thames, on Elie de Beaumont's theory of mountain-chains, and on the great landslip which occurred near Lyme Regis in 1839 when he was vicar of Axminster.

His principal work, however, is the Outlines of the Geology of England and Wales (1822), being a second edition of the small work issued by William Phillips and written in co-operation with that author. The original contributions of Conybeare formed the principal portion of this edition, of which only Part 1, dealing with the Carboniferous and newer strata, was published. It affords evidence throughout of the extensive and accurate knowledge possessed by Conybeare; and it exercised a marked influence on the progress of geology in Britain.

Conybeare was an advocate of gap creationism.

He was a fellow of the Royal Society and a corresponding member of the Institute of France. In 1844, he was awarded the Wollaston medal by the Geological Society of London.

His elder brother, the scholar John Josias Conybeare, was also interested in geology.

=== Death ===
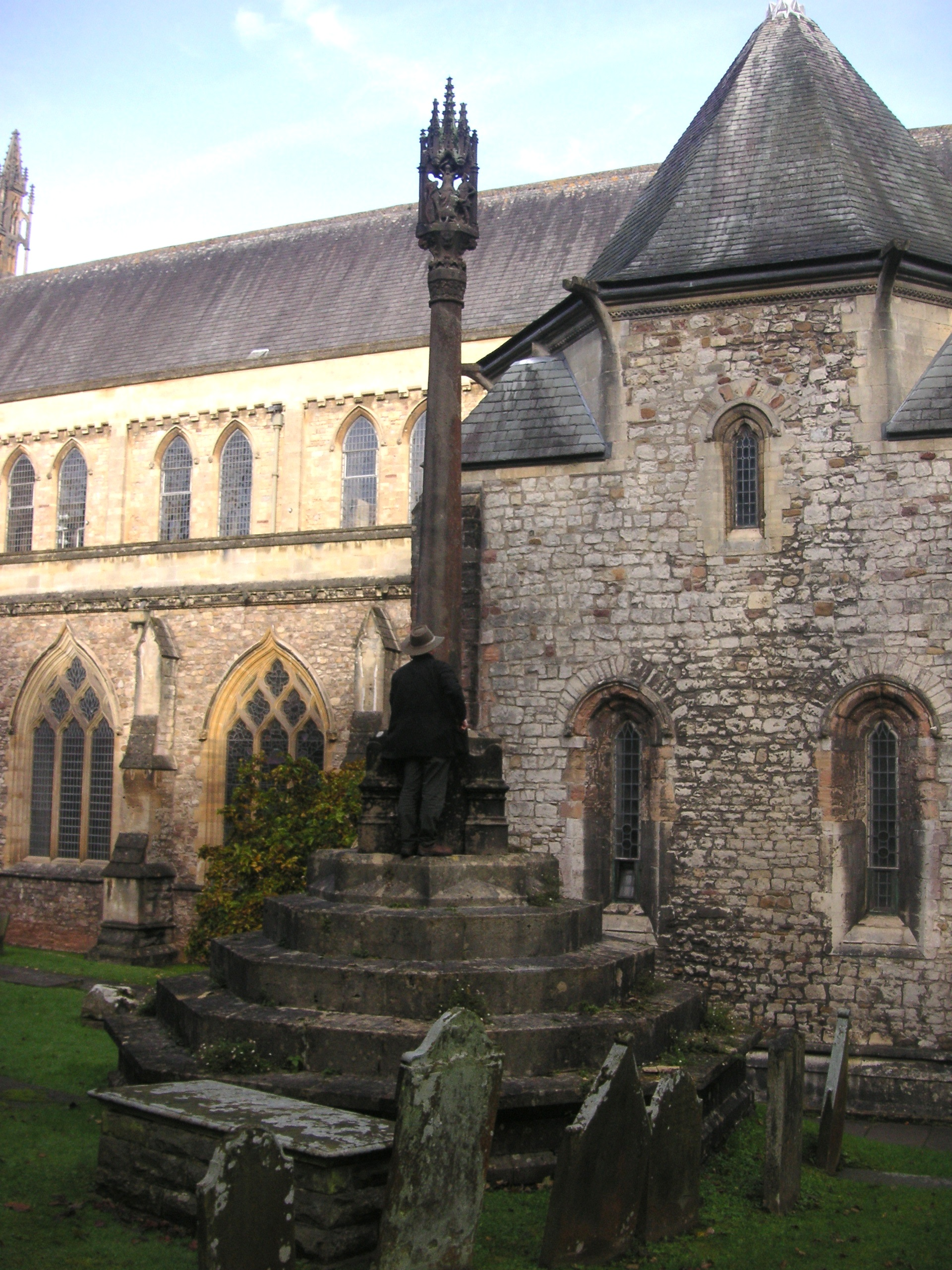
W D Conybeare's Grave and Memorial, Llandaff Cathedral.

He was taken ill on the way to Weybridge, Surrey, to see his gravely ill eldest son, William John Conybeare in July 1857, who died, and his own death followed shortly thereafter on 12 August 1857, at Itchen Stoke, Hampshire, where another son, Charles Ranken Conybeare, had recently taken up the incumbency of the parish church, and a third son, Henry Conybeare, was later to build a new church to replace it. He is buried near the Chapter House at Llandaff Cathedral and his tomb is marked by a cross on a slender memorial shaft.

== Works ==
- Outlines of the Geology of England and Wales, With an Introductory Compendium of the General Principles of That Science, and Comparative Views of the Structure of Foreign Countries. Part I [all issued], (London, 1822). Conybeare and W. Phillips
- "Observations on the South Western Coal District of England," in Transactions of the Geological Society of London, 2nd ser., 1, pt. 1, (1822). 210–316. W. Buckland and Conybeare
- "Memoir Illustrative of a General Geological Map of the Principal Mountain Chains of Europe," in Annals of Philosophy, n.s. 5 (1823), 1–16, 135–149, 210–218, 278–289, 356–359; n.s. 6 (1824), 214–219.
- "Notice of a Discovery of a New Fossil Animal, Forming a Link Between the lchthyosaurus and the Crocodile; Together With General Remarks on the Osteology of the Ichthyosaurus," in Transactions of the Geological Society of London, 5 (1821), 558–594
- "Additional Notices on the Fossil Genera Ichthyosaurus and Plesiosaurus," ibid., 2nd ser., 1 pt. 1 (1822), 103–123; and "On the Discovery of an Almost Perfect Skeleton of the Plesiosaurus," ibid., pt. 2 (1824), 381–389. Conybeare and H. T. De La Beche
- "On the Hydrographical Basin of the Thames, With a View More Especially to Investigate the Causes Which Have Operated in the Formation of the Valleys of That River, and Its Tributary Streams," in Proceedings of the Geological Society of London, 1, no. 12 (1829), 145–149.
- "Answer to Dr Fleming's View of the Evidence From the Animal Kingdom, as to the Former Temperature of the Northern Regions," in Edinburgh New Philosophical Journal, 7 (1829), 142–152.
- "On Mr Lyell's 'Principles of Geology,'" in Philosophical Magazine and Annals, n.s. 8 (1830), 215–219; and "An Examination of Those Phaenomena of Geology, Which Seem to Bear Most Directly on Theoretical Speculations," ibid., 359–362, 401–406; n.s. 9 (1831), 19–23, 111–117, 188–197, 258–270.
- Conybeare, "Inquiry How Far the Theory of M. Élie de Beaumont Concerning the Parallelism of the Lines of Elevation of the Same Geological Area, Is Agreeable to the Phaenomena as Exhibited in Great Britain," in Philosophical Magazine and Journal of Science, 1 (1832), 118–126; 4 (1834), 404–414.
- Conybeare, "Report on the Progress, Actual State and Ulterior Prospects of Geological Science," in Report of the British Association for the Advancement of Science, 1831–2 (1833), pp. 365–414
- An Analytical Examination into the Character, Value, and Just Application of the Writings of the Christian Fathers During the Ante-Nicene Period being the Bampton Lectures for the Year MDCCCXXXIX. By W. D. Conybeare, M. A. of Christ Church, Vicar of Axminster. (1839)
- "A Critique of Uniformitarian Geology: A Letter From W. D. Conybeare to Charles Lyell, 1841," in Proceedings of the American Philosophical Society, 111 (1967), 272–287., M. J. S. Rudwick
