= James Cropper (abolitionist) =

English merchant and philanthropist

James Cropper (1773–1840) was an English businessman and philanthropist, known as an abolitionist who made a major contribution to the abolition of slavery throughout the British Empire in 1833.

== Early life ==
James Cropper was born in Winstanley, Lancashire into a Quaker family, the son of Thomas Cropper and his wife Rebecca Winstanley. He was intended by his father for the family farm, but he left home at 17 and became an apprentice in the Liverpool mercantile house of the Rathbone Brothers. Cropper married in 1796 Mary Brinsmead, and outlived her by two years. They had two sons, John and Edward, who survived him, and a daughter, who married Joseph Sturge of Birmingham, and died in giving birth to her first child. In 1799 James Cropper went into partnership with Thomas Benson to form the shipping agents Cropper, Benson and Co. He became an abolitionist, active against slavery in the Caribbean. He also was concerned about poverty in Ireland, made a series of visits there, and established cotton mills. The success of his firm enabled Cropper to eventually build a pocket stately home called Dingle Bank on the rocky promontory of Dingle Point, overlooking the River Mersey in the south of Liverpool. Two adjacent houses were built for Cropper's sons – John and Edward.

== Contribution to the Abolition of Slavery Act 1833 ==
The Cropper family were Quakers, a faith committed to abolishing the slave trade. In 1790 James Cropper joined the Liverpool firm of Rathbone, Benson and Co under the company's proprietor William Rathbone - a leading abolitionist. The seventeen-year-old James Cropper soon became acquainted with a wider circle of radical Liverpool abolitionists whose members also included William Roscoe. Cropper was able to witness the campaign for the abolition of the slave trade from the very city whose interests were closely tied up within it.

After the Slave Trade Act 1807, James Cropper joined the African Institution, a body that would continue to monitor the plight of the slaves. The Slave Trade Act 1807 had not freed a single slave in the Caribbean, it merely banned the trade in slaves and Cropper became increasingly disillusioned with the abolitionist idea that slavery would "die a natural death". Joshua Civin would go on to state that "James Cropper and other Liverpool merchants were pivotal in rejuvenating British antislavery"

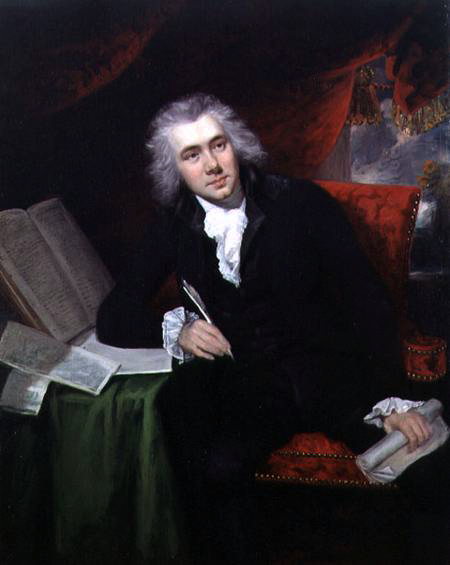
William Wilberforce

=== The petitioning of William Wilberforce ===
James Cropper also became concerned at the continued mistreatment of enslaved Africans in the years following the Slave Trade Act 1807. In his book The Dissenters (1978) Michael R Watts credits Cropper with opening the campaign for emancipation.

The campaign for emancipation opened with a series of letters which the Quaker merchant James Cropper wrote to Wilberforce in 1821 and which he published in the Liverpool Mercury.

— Michael R. Watts The Dissenters p. 443 (1978).

Cropper maintained that slavery was becoming more and more uneconomic and supported by a series of unfair subsidies when compared to sugar grown by free men in the East Indies.

Mark Jones in his thesis The mobilisation of public opinion against the slave trade and slavery (1998) would also maintain that it would be James Cropper who would initiate the abolitionist revival that was to culminate in the Slavery Abolition Act 1833 and end slavery throughout the British Empire.

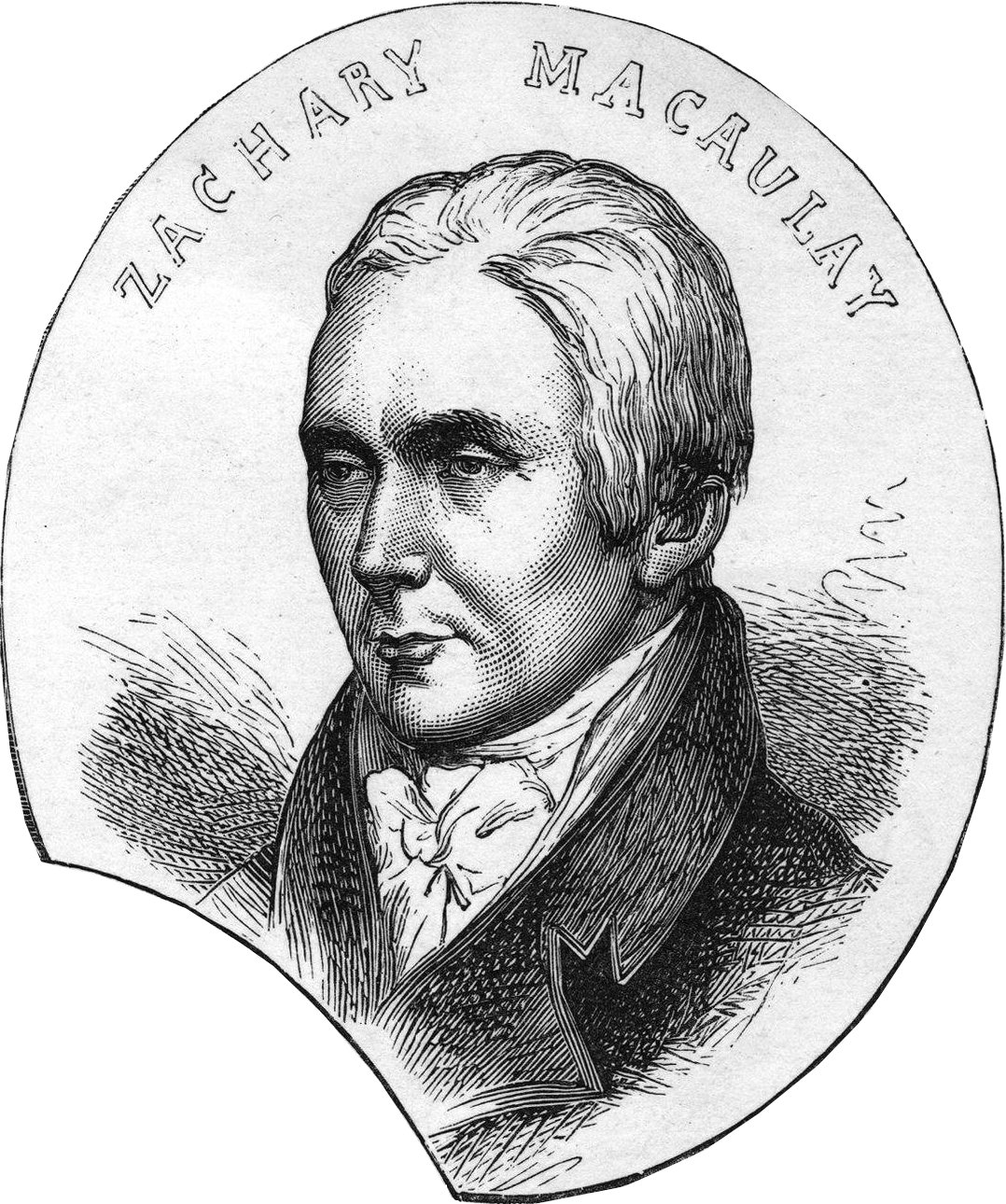
Zachary Macaulay (1768–1838)

It was James Cropper, a Quaker businessman of Liverpool, who examined, questioned and ultimately attacked British slavery from 1821, who impelled abolitionism forward... The old abolitionists rallied to Cropper's side only after the newcomer had set the movement on an ideological and organisational course of his own choosing.

=== The petitioning of Zachary Macaulay ===
Cropper then went on to petition a second veteran abolitionist, the former Governor of Sierra Leone, Zachary Macaulay. In a letter to Macauley dated 12 July 1822, James Cropper wrote of his intention to form a society in Liverpool, which would promote the final abolition of slavery itself. Macauley had been strongly associated with the Slave Trade Act 1807 and had been a member of the extended group of abolitionists which later came to be known as the "Clapham Sect".

Macaulay had personal experience working on West Indies plantations and witnessed the impact of West African slave trading. He also had a phenomenal memory and supplied statistics and facts for many antislavery speeches made in the House of Commons and the House of Lords.

Macauley's daughter Margaret, would marry James Cropper's son Edward, so forming an extended group of radical 'Dingle Group' of abolitionists centred upon James Cropper's home at Dingle Bank, South Liverpool.

Cropper would use his maritime links with the United States to collect reliable information on the conditions of slaves and promote free labour over slave labour as a means of attacking the economic viability of slavery.

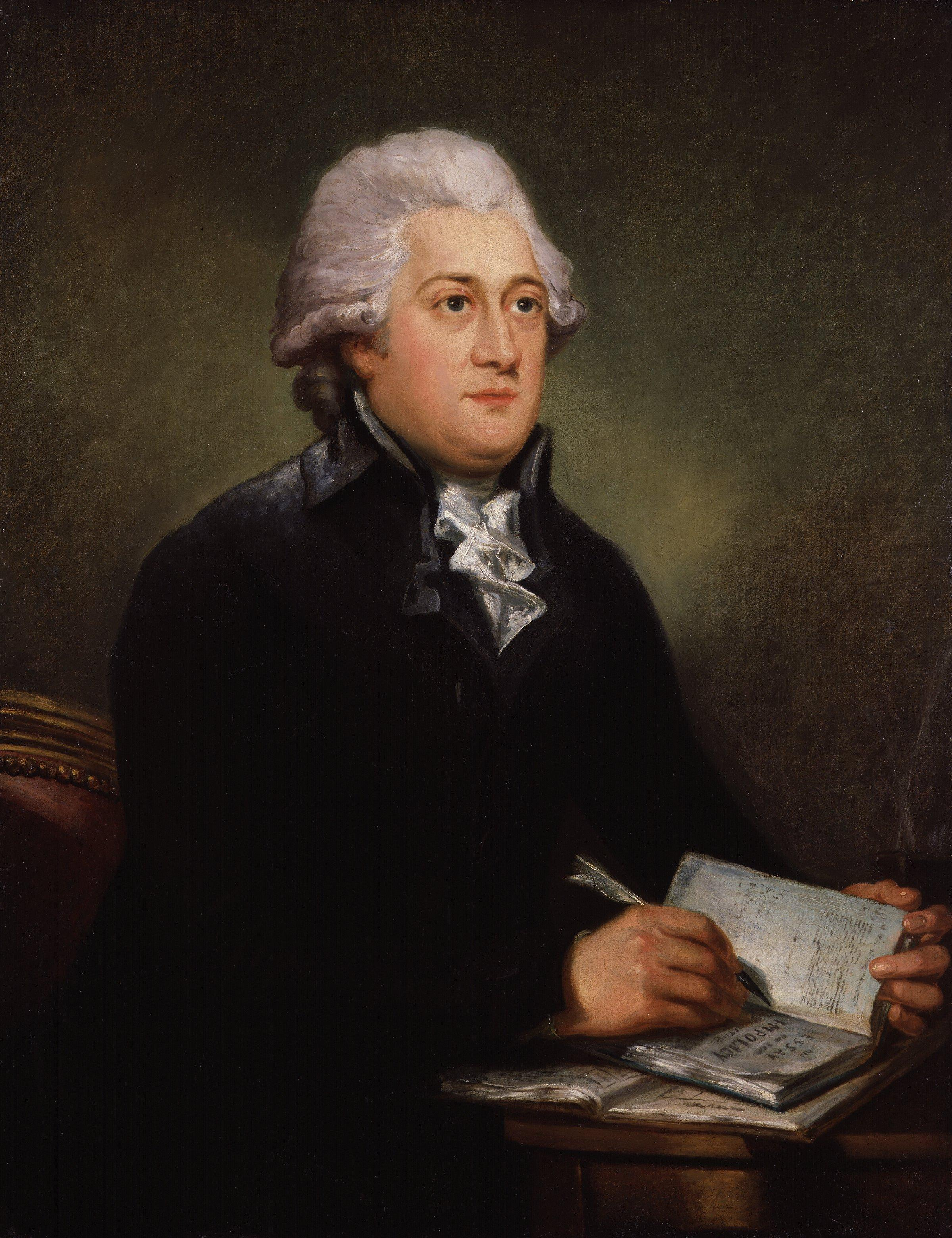
Thomas Clarkson (1760–1846)

=== The recruitment of Thomas Clarkson ===
In June 1823, James Cropper wrote to Zachary Macauley suggesting that his third veteran "recruit", Thomas Clarkson should resurrect his 1788 tour of the country, this time to campaign for the total abolition of slavery. Cropper wrote the letter from Clarkson's own home. James Cropper then proceeded to subsidize Clarkson's tour of the United Kingdom to the sum of £500 (£65,000 in 2022 values). Cropper's sons, John and Edward, donated a further £100 each.

Cropper's radical proposals regarding Clarkson's tour may have brought him into conflict with the more moderate views of William Wilberforce, however on 26 October 1824, the Derby abolitionist Matthew Babbington wrote to Cropper and enclosed a letter that Wilberforce had sent him two days earlier. In this missive, Wilberforce empathised his support for Cropper regarding the direction that his revived campaign for slave emancipation should take.

In his letter to Babbington, Wilberforce wrote, "Good Cropper's proposal ... makes me love better, a man I already esteemed and loved."

Clarkson and Cropper split the country between them, Cropper and others would spend four months touring around districts which already had existing anti-slavery societies while Clarkson would use his oratory and fame to convert new audiences around the country to the emancipation cause. Clarkson would remain as a key speaker of the society and devote much of his time to working with James Cropper and others in disseminating anti-slavery materials to the United States.

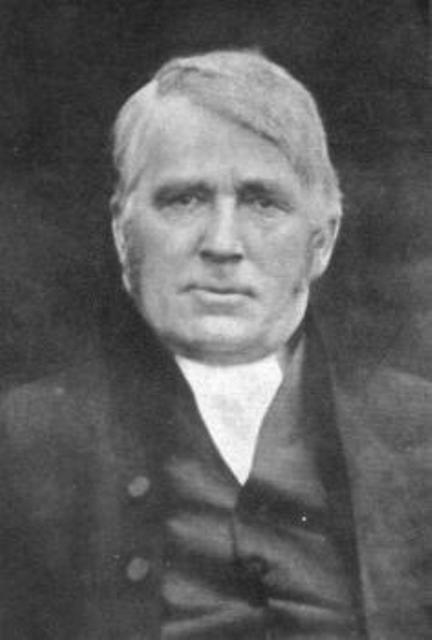
Joseph Sturge (1793–1859)

=== The recruitment of Joseph Sturge ===
Cropper did not stop with the "old abolitionists", and he recruited "new blood" for his cause notably Joseph Sturge of Birmingham, who Cropper personally mentored into becoming a radical abolitionist. In October 1825 Joseph Sturge joined forces with James Cropper who had been publicising the anti-slavery cause in the English midlands. Cropper and Sturge talked with leading citizens, held public meetings, gave speeches, and formed societies. Both Sturge and Cropper shared the same rural Quaker origins and Cropper had been impressed by the young Sturge's speeches at the annual London abolitionist meetings of 1823 and 1824. Despite the twenty-year age gap, the two would form a formidable partnership and lifelong friendship. In 1831 Joseph Sturge formed a partnership with James Cropper's son, John Cropper to form the Young England Abolitionists, it was distinguished from other anti-slavery groups by its uncompromising arguments and vigorous campaigning tactics. Joseph Sturge would marry James Cropper's daughter Eliza – so once again extending the influence of "The Dingle Group", i.e. the extended Cropper family of abolitionists centred on Dingle Bank, south Liverpool.

His interest in it (abolitionism) was continually nourished by the discussions which took place, almost annually at the Friends' Yearly Meeting and especially by the close personal intercourse which soon grew up between him and Mr. James Cropper of Liverpool ... we need not wonder to find Mr. Sturge closing his report with the remark that "during the discussion, and particularly while Mr James Cropper was speaking, an almost intense degree of interest was shown, and the numbers present far exceeded those at any of the previous sittings" ... From this time forward Joseph Sturge was irrevocably committed to the cause of the slave, and soon began to enter upon that long series of active services in connection with it, which ended only with life.

— Memoir of Joseph Sturge (1865) Henry Richard, p. 80

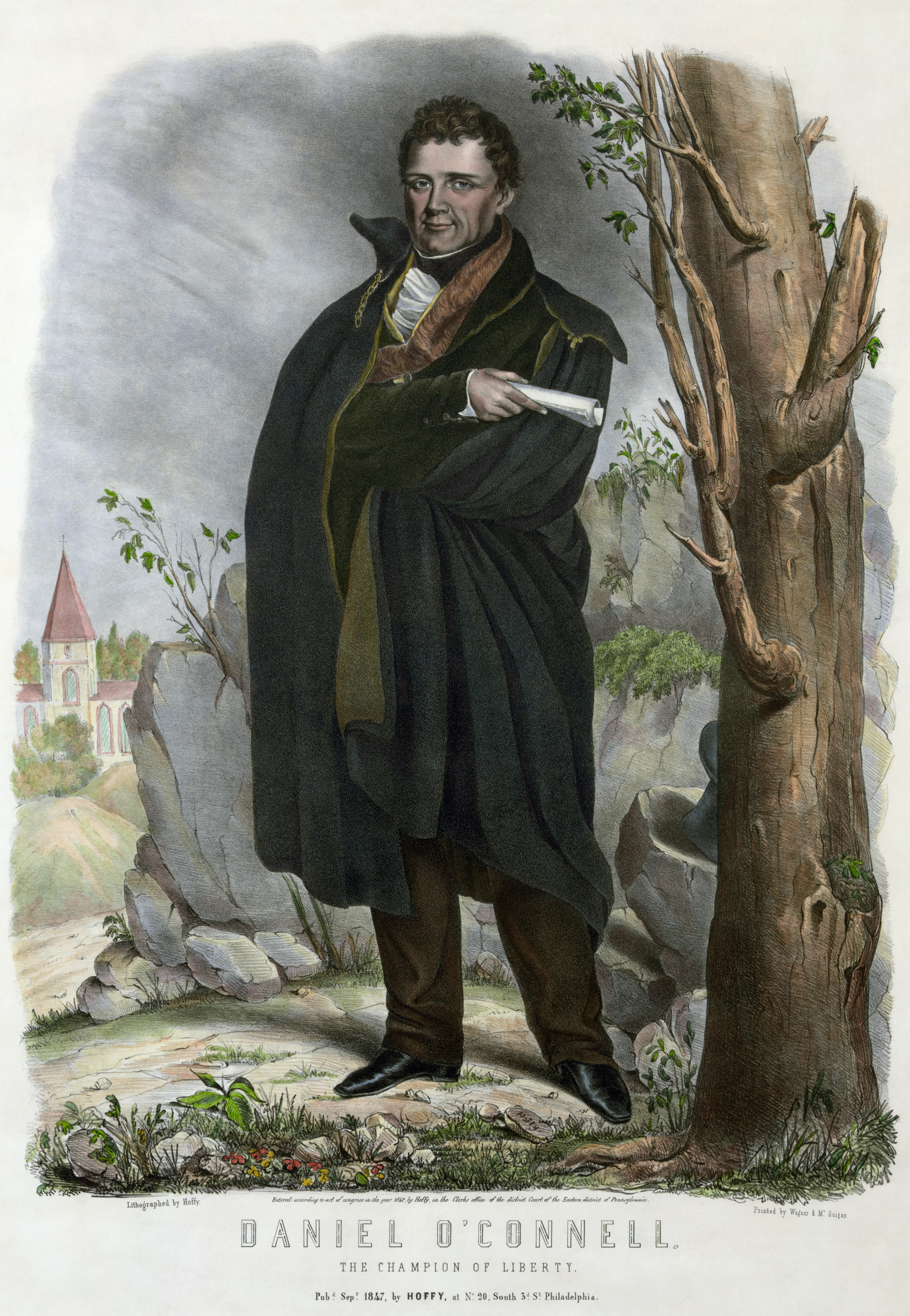
Daniel O'Connell (1775–1847)

=== The recruitment of Daniel O'Connell ===
In 1824 Cropper and his daughter Eliza, paid a visit to Ireland where he found many farmers on the brink of starvation with employment scarce and very low wages. It was on this visit that James Cropper would recruit the finest anti-slavery orator of the nineteenth century – Daniel O'Connell.

O'Connell's interest in the issue of slavery had been dated back to 1824 when James Cropper, a Liverpool Quaker merchant, visited Ireland to raise support for a proposal to undermine West Indian slavery.

— Liberator: The Life and Death of Daniel O'Connell 1830–1847. Patrick M. Geoghegan (2012)

Daniel O'Connell's bond with the "Dingle Group" would grow even closer, when in February 1844, Edward Cropper's father-in-Law, Lord Denman, Lord Chief Justice, led the House of Lords in quashing O'Connell's conviction for inciting rebellion in Ireland. O'Connell would gain his freedom after serving just three months of a twelve-month prison sentence. O'Connell, in turn, would be an inspiration to many influential black activists including the most important African American orator of the 19th century – Frederick Douglass. Douglass would say of O'Connell.

I cannot proceed without alluding to a man who did much to abolish slavery, I mean Daniel O'Connell. I feel grateful to him, for his voice has made American slavery shake to its centre.

— Frederick Douglass speech Delivered in Cork, Ireland, on 14 October 1845.

== Accusation of instigating the 1823 Demerara Slave Revolt ==
In August 1823, a slave revolt broke out on Liverpool Merchant John Gladstone's 'Success' plantation in Demerara (part of modern-day Guyana, South America). The rebellion quickly spread to involve more than 10,000 enslaved people between August 18 and 19 and was led by slaves with the highest relative status. The rebellion had been instigated by Jack Gladstone, a slave who, as was common at the time, had been given the surname of his "owner". The rebellion also involved his father Quamina Gladstone and senior members of their church group, including allegedly its English pastor, John Smith of the London Missionary Society who worked with the enslaved Africans. The largely non-violent rebellion was brutally crushed under the Governorship of John Murray with an estimate of between 100 and 250 slaves killed. The brutal crushing of the rebellion also brought the general plight of the slaves in the sugar plantations to the attention of the British people and would thus bring closer the eventual abolition of slavery.

Cropper entered into lengthy public correspondence with Gladstone, the largest slaveholder in the British Empire, and their correspondence in the Liverpool Mercury was later produced in book form in order that the whole of this controversy is submitted to the public. Gladstone insisted that slaves in the West Indies were well treated, and their working conditions protected by existing laws. Cropper accused slave owners of excessive cruelty and causing the degradation of African people. He claimed that the slaves were routinely whipped, were indiscriminately sold, separating from their families, and for six months of the year had to work for one half the night, as well as the whole day.

As an experienced Liverpool merchant, Cropper, together with his wife and daughter had been given sole responsibility for distributing anti-slavery leaflets in the north of England, Ireland, the Caribbean and the United States As a result, Cropper's pamphlets were personally blamed by Liverpool merchant John Gladstone for inciting the 1823 Demerara slave revolt. In their "back and forth" correspondence in the Liverpool Mercury (December 1823). John Gladstone stated in no uncertain terms that he believed the slave revolt on his plantation had originated not in Demerara, South America but in Dingle, South Liverpool...

at the same time printing and circulating those opinions, thereby instigating the negroes to insurrection, with its consequences, murder and destruction ... the late revolt in Demerara (originating here)..

— Sir John Gladstone. The Correspondence Between John Gladstone, Esq., M.P., and James Cropper. Liverpool Mercury, p. 17 and 25 (1824).

In 1824 the pro-slavery activist and geographer James MacQueen berated both Thomas Clarkson and James Cropper for questioning the economic viability of West Indian slavery in his 427-page book The West India colonies: the calumnies and misrepresentations circulated against them by the Edinburgh Review, Mr. Clarkson, Mr. Cropper.

== Support for Black activism in the United States ==
In the 1820s James Cropper sponsored several American free black initiatives, for example in 1828 he donated to a Philadelphia school for black infants and provided large scale financial support for American antislavery newspapers. James Cropper also used his Liverpool links to directly encourage antislavery activism in the United States. Sir John Gladstone was already critical of Cropper's growing influence in the slave states writing that "Considerable alarm has been felt in the southern states since Mr Cropper's publications have been circulated amongst the slaves there."

The Cropper family scrapbook was filled with anti-slavery literature and contained a list of contacts in the United States who had already been shipped large packets of his abolitionist pamphlets from Liverpool. The pamphlets, usually up to 20 pages long would be commonly read out loud at meetings and make their way to the slave states. The earliest list (c.1827-9) included editors of all three American antislavery newspapers.

Fellow Quaker, Benjamin Lundy edited the Genius of Universal Emancipation and regularly acknowledged his debt to his sponsors in Liverpool. John Brown Russwurm edited the first black newspaper, Freedom's Journal (1827-9). Russwurm was only the third African American to graduate from an American College. Quaker Enoch Lewis was editor of the African Observer (1827-8). Cropper replaced Russwurm as the main contact in the New York's free black community with the African American Peter Williams, Jr. Williams was an Episcopalian bishop and a future member of the board of the interracial American Antislavery Society. Cropper also sent pamphlets to William Lloyd Garrison. Cropper's 1830s list included James McCune Smith, a young black intellectual and militant. Smith was the first African American to gain a medical degree having graduated in Glasgow, Scotland.

The pamphleteering activities of James Cropper also began to take effect in New York City, and they would not go unnoticed amongst the local free black population.

To pursue their goals and create local unanimity, blacks in New York City instituted their own antislavery society. Meeting on December 26th, 1832, at the Abysinnian Baptist Church, the city's people of color elected Samuel Hardenburgh as chair and Henry Sipkins as Secretary. The new organization first saluted European supporters of the black convention movement. Those whose support was widely reported included James Cropper and Thomas Cropper in England and Daniel O'Connell of Ireland, whom the group hailed as friends of black rights and religious freedom and saluted for their opposition to the American Colonization Society.

— David Ruggles – a Radical Black Abolitionist and the Underground Railroad in New York City. Graham Russell Hodges, p. 51 (2010)

== Influence on the black activist James McCune Smith ==
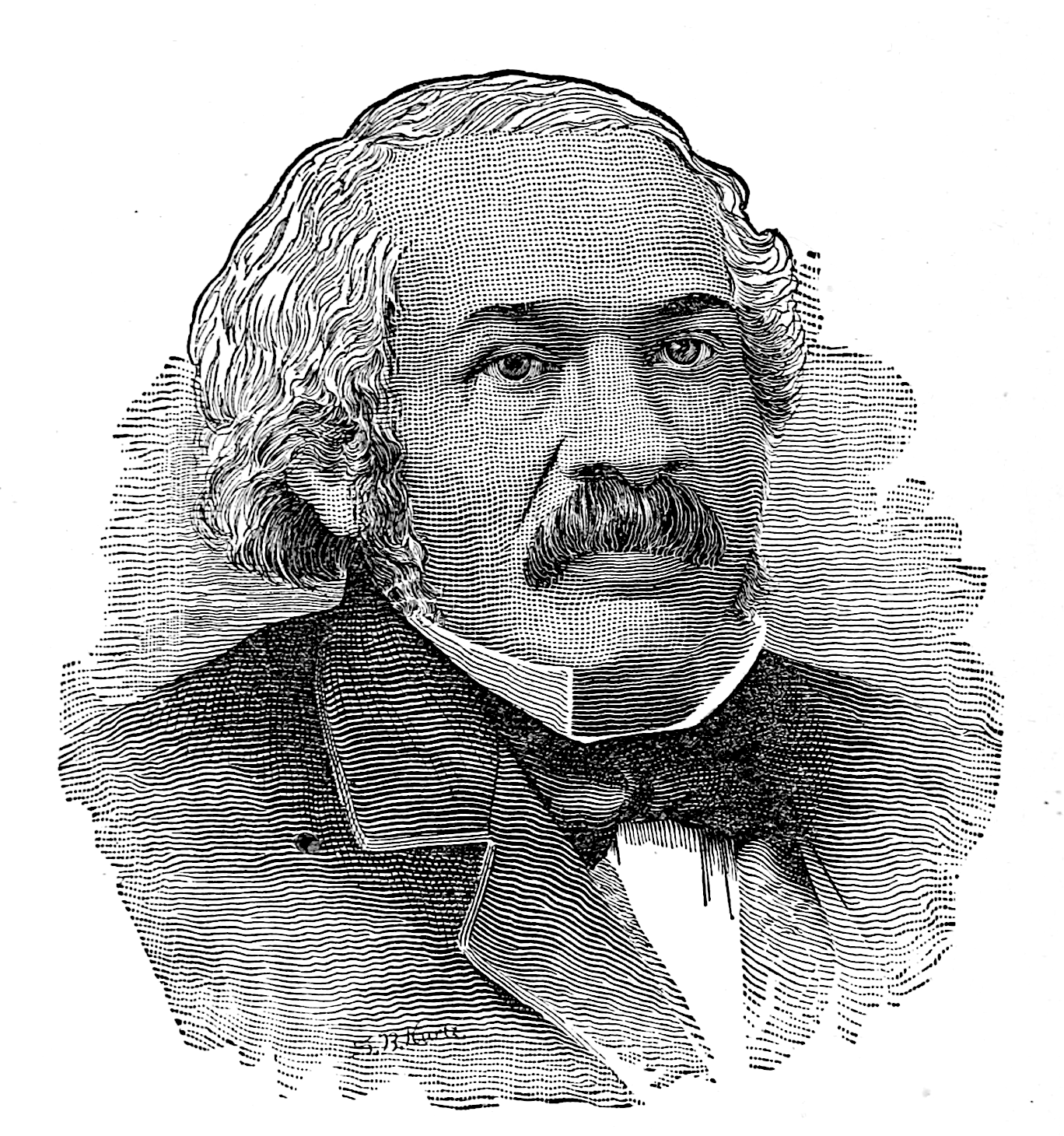
James McCune Smith (1813–1865)

On 9 September 1832 the nineteen-year-old black activist and intellectual James McCune Smith sailed into Liverpool and spent nearly a week in the city. On 11 September 1832, Smith paid a visit to James Cropper at Dingle Bank. The obvious dedication of James Cropper to the antislavery cause had a profound effect on James McCune Smith.

Chartered a coach, and drove out to the Princely mansion of J.C. Esq., which is beautifully situated in a lovely spot, on the banks of the Mersey, a few miles from Liverpool ... The tone of conversation delighted me. All appeared familiar with the names of our leading abolitionists and were incessant and minute in their enquiries after the condition, feelings, and prospects of the unenfranchised Americans ... What chiefly affected me, was to perceive on several articles of the breakfast set, the figure of a chained and kneeling slave – under which was written "Remember them that are in bonds, as being bound with them ... How deeply must he feel for the sufferings of bondsmen, who makes such remembrances the companions of his meals! "The sight of a pale face" no longer "makes me sick".

— The Works of James McCune Smith.

At a slavery debate in Liverpool, James Cropper also introduced McCune Smith to the militant Liverpool-born abolitionist George Thompson, much to McCune Smith's delight.

When Mr Borthwick sat down, the audience rose and turning to a box, a little to the left of the one in which I sat, gave three tremendous cheers. A gentleman bowed in acknowledgement. It was Mr. GEORGE THOMPSON.

=== The works of James McCune Smith ===
Liverpool's George "notorious" Thompson (1804–1878) was a celebrated activist and anti-slavery lecturer on both sides of the Atlantic and he later became the Member of Parliament for Tower Hamlets in London. Thompson's first lecture tour of the United States in 1834, at the invitation of his lifelong friend William Lloyd Garrison, coincided with that of Captain Charles Stuart. Thompson's vitriolic denunciations of slavery were often met with death threats. Thompson was also a lifelong friend of the black abolitionist Nathaniel Paul – all of these activists had very strong ties to James Cropper at Dingle Bank.

In 1853, James McCune Smith, along with his great friend Frederick Douglass, helped start the National Council of Colored People, the first permanent national organization for African Americans. Frederick Douglass called McCune Smith "the single most important influence on my life". Smith wrote the Introduction to Douglass's book My Bondage and My Freedom. in 1855.

== Relationship with the American abolitionist William Lloyd Garrison. ==
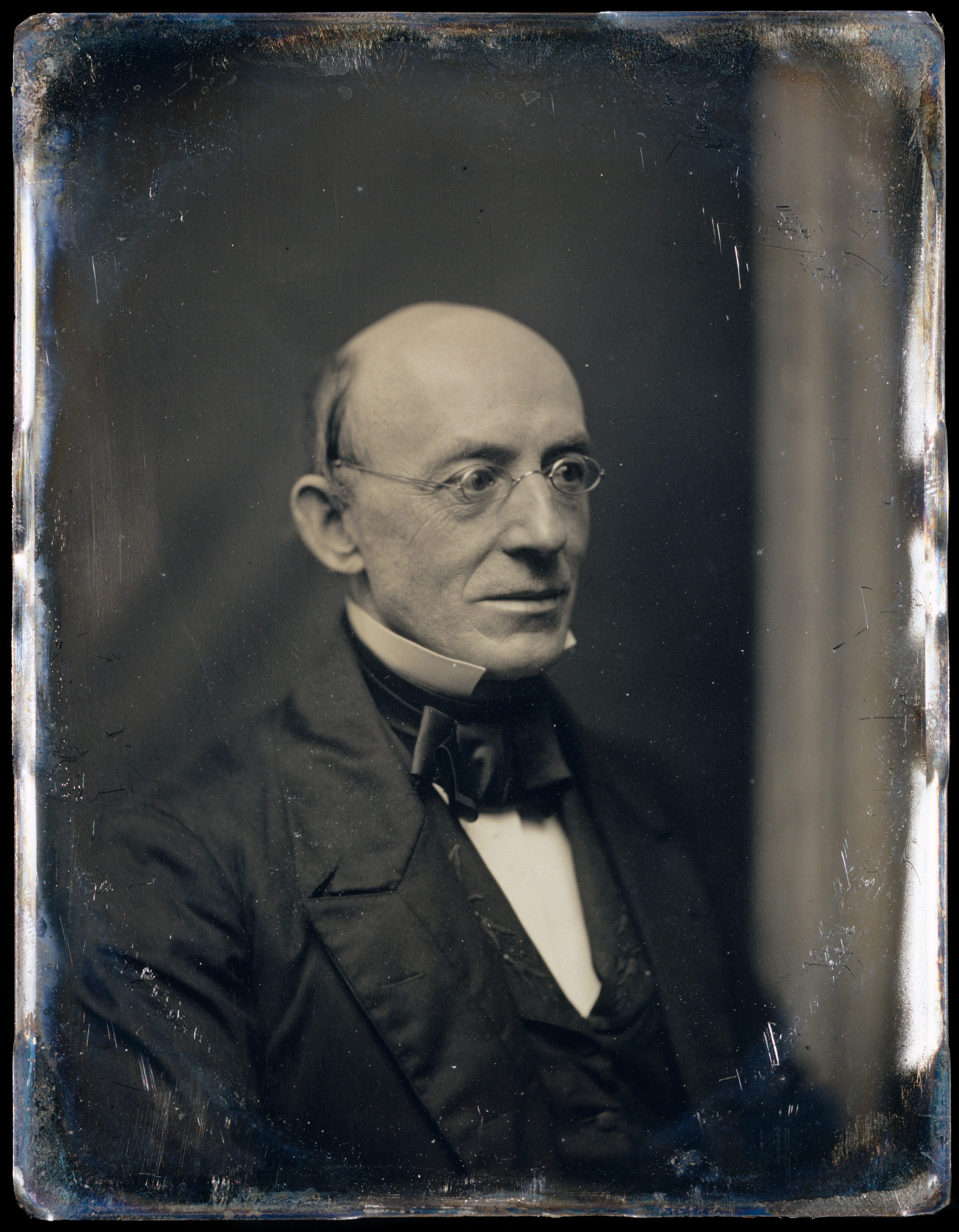
William Lloyd Garrison (1805–1879)

In 1833 the American abolitionist William Lloyd Garrison was invited to Dingle Bank, south Liverpool and the success of his lecture trip would depend heavily on Cropper's stage managing. Garrison arrived in Liverpool in 1833 as the Abolition of Slavery Act was being read in Parliament. Garrison would become the leading American abolitionist prior to the American Civil War. Garrison stayed at Dingle Bank for three days before heading to London. Upon arriving in Liverpool in May 1833 Garrison wrote:

My excellent friend James Cropper has a delightful retreat, called Dingle Bank, which nature and art have embellished in the most attractive manner. This great and good man is now in London, but there has been no lack of hospitality toward me on the part of those whom he has left behind....As in duty bound, both by my instructions and my obligations of gratitude, I immediately called upon James Cropper, in Finsbury Circus, at whose hands I experienced the utmost hospitality and kindness, and from whose lips I received congratulations upon my arrival at the very crisis of the antislavery cause in England. He informed me that a large number of delegates, from various anti-slavery societies in the kingdom, were then in London, vigilantly watching the progress of the Abolition Bill through Parliament; that they took breakfast together every morning at the Guildhall Coffee House, and from thence adjourned to the anti-slavery rooms at No. 18, Aldermanbury, for the purpose of devising plans and discussing propositions for the accomplishment of their grand design; and that if I would attend, he would give me a general introduction. My heart was full of gratitude to him for his kindness, and to God for ordering events in a manner so highly auspicious... Accordingly, I was prompt in my attendance at the Coffee House the next morning. About sixty delegates were present, most of whom were members of the Society of Friends. After the reading of a portion of the Scriptures, breakfast was served up, at the close of which Mr. Cropper rose and begged leave to introduce to the company William Lloyd Garrison, the Agent of the New-England Anti-Slavery Society, from America. He then briefly stated the object of my mission, and expressed a hope that I would be permitted, at a suitable opportunity, to lay my purposes more fully before them.

— William Lloyd Garrison, 1805–1879; the story of his life told by his children, volume 1, chapter 11. Francis Jackson Garrison. (1885)

Garrison also credited James Cropper with persuading William Wilberforce to cease his support for the American Colonization Society and its aim of encouraging the voluntary repatriation of black people back to the free African state of Liberia.

But the crowning feature of the evening was James Cropper's announcement: "It is with very great pleasure that I can add the name of William Wilberforce as having changed his opinion. He now deeply regrets that he was ever led to say anything in approbation of the Colonization Society."

Cropper had previously written a pamphlet criticizing his friend Thomas Clarkson's support for the self-same society.

== Involvement in the premature ending of the slave apprenticeship scheme ==
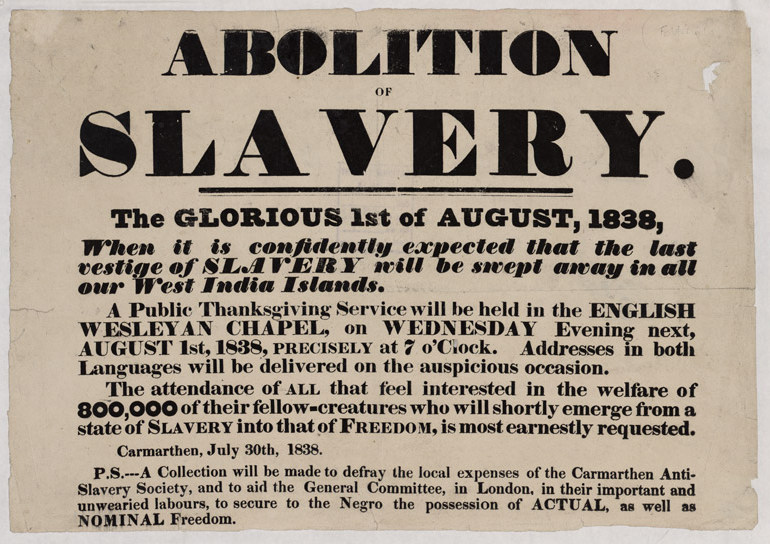
Abolition of Slavery The Glorious 1st of August 1838

In 1833 slavery in the Caribbean was replaced by a six-year 'apprenticeship' scheme, James Cropper suspected that apprenticeship was no better than slavery. In 1836 his son-in-law Joseph Sturge was dispatched to Jamaica to report on conditions in the plantations.

It remained to Joseph Sturge, with the constant support of Cropper on the side lines, to fight the outstanding battle concerning apprenticeship.

— James Cropper and his Contribution to the Liverpool Antislavery movement. K. Charlton (1971).

Joseph Sturge travelled to the Caribbean, and his report to Parliament resulted in the apprenticeship scheme being scrapped two years early and true freedom coming to 800,000 enslaved people on 1 August 1838.

== Other works ==
Successful in business, Cropper became the founder of Cropper, Benson, & Co., merchants, and made a personal fortune. He worked for the repeal of the orders of council which, up to 1811, restricted British commerce with the US, He also became involved with the port of Liverpool. Cropper was an active director of the Liverpool and Manchester Railway from 1830. In 1833 he decided to start an industrial school for boys, in the area of agriculture; and after visiting Germany and Switzerland, he built a school and orphan-house on his estate at Fearnhead, near Warrington, with a house for himself.

== Death and tribute from William Lloyd Garrison ==
James Cropper resided at Fearnhead until his death in February 1840. He was buried in the Quaker burial-ground at Liverpool by the side of his wife. The house at Fearnhead bore the following inscription:

In this house lived James Cropper, one, and he not the least, of that small but noble band of christian men who, after years of labour and through much opposition, accomplished the abolition of West Indian slavery; and thus having lived the life of the righteous, he died in the full assurance of faith on the 26th of Feby. 1840.

After James Cropper's death, the editor of the American anti-slavery 'Liberator' newspaper William Lloyd Garrison penned a sonnet in his honour.

CROPPER! Among the wise, the great, the good,
The friends of man, whate'er his caste or clime,
Thy memory shall be hailed with gratitude,
Thy labours honored to the ends of time!
Thine was a soul with sympathy imbued,
Broad as the earth, and as the heavens sublime;
Thy godlike object, steadfastly pursued,
To save thy race from misery and crime.
Mourn England! For the loss thou hast sustained,
And let the nations of the earth lament,
With spirit broken, and with grief unfeigned-
And to her tears let LIBERTY give vent;
A star of glory, has in darkness waned,
No more on this earth survives the good man eloquent.

— William Lloyd Garrison The Liberator 7 March 1840.

== Tribute from the American author Harriet Beecher Stowe ==
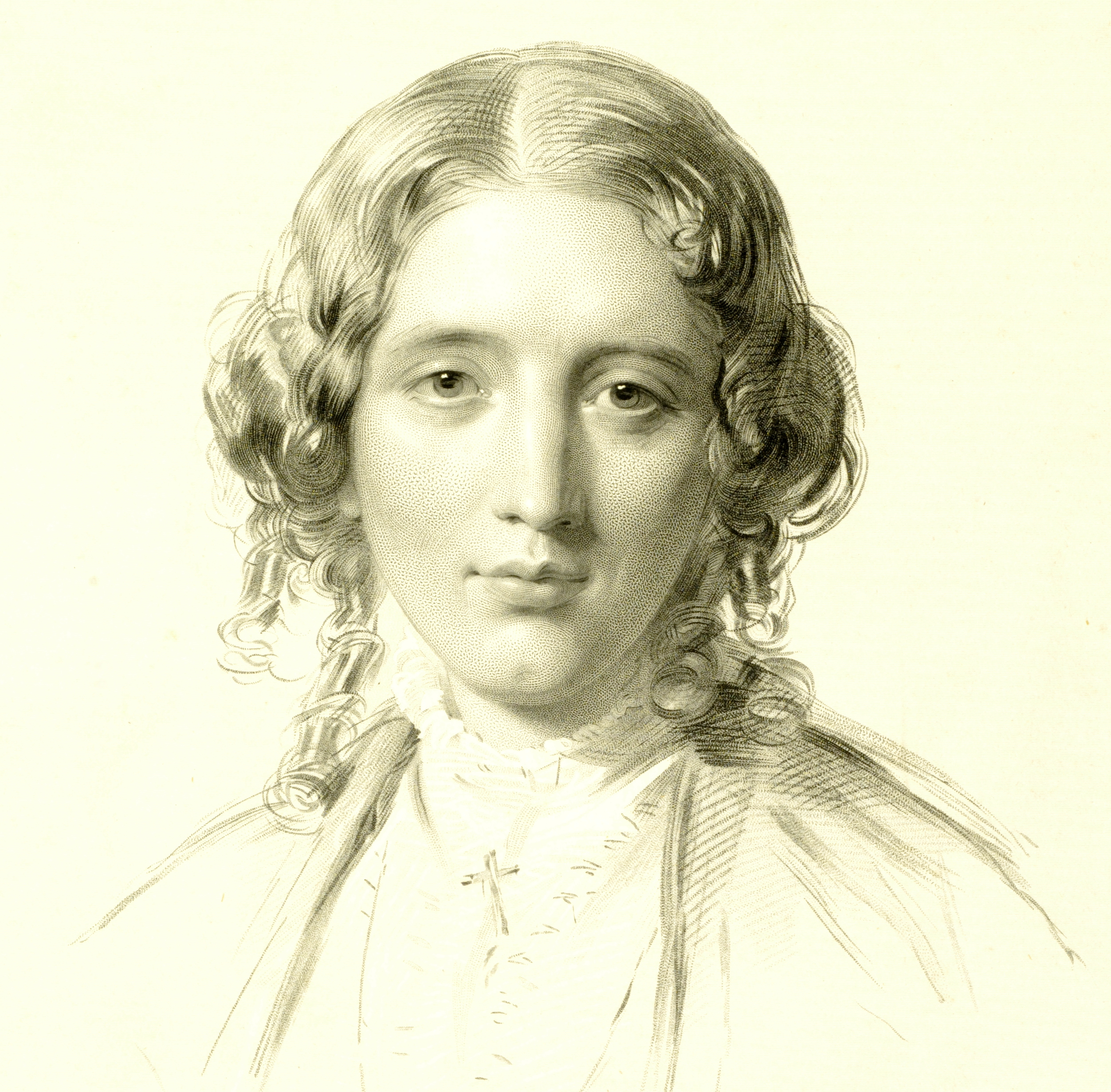
Harriet Beecher Stowe (1811–1896)

In 1853 the celebrated American author Harriet Beecher Stowe came to Liverpool at the start of her speaking tour of major British Cities. Stowe's major work, Uncle Tom's Cabin (1852) depicted the harsh conditions of slavery in the United States in the decades leading up to the American Civil War. The book sold over 300,000 copies in the United States and over one and a half million copies in the United Kingdom. It was the best-selling novel of the 19th century. In her memoirs Stowe would write about her thoughts on the late James Cropper and his extended Dingle family as being the initiators of the 'abolitionist revival' that had resulted in the 1833 Abolition of Slavery Act and the freeing of some 800,000 people within the British Empire.

In her memoirs Sunny Memories of Foreign Lands (1854). Stowe would write:

We were inquiring of some friends for the most convenient hotel, when we found the son of Mr. Cropper, of Dingle Bank, waiting in the cabin, to take us with him to their hospitable abode...Our carriage at last drove on, taking us through Liverpool, and a mile or two out, and at length wound its way along the gravel paths of a beautiful little retreat, on the banks of the Mersey, called the "Dingle". ... Liverpool was at first to the antislavery cause nearly what New York has been with us. Its commercial interests were largely implicated in the slave trade, and the virulence of opposition towards the first movers of the antislavery reform in Liverpool was about as great as it is now against abolitionists in Charleston.

On 13 April 1853, Harriet Beecher Stowe gave a public speech in Liverpool. The Chairman of the meeting, the Liverpool merchant and abolitionist, Mr. Adam Hodgson presented Stowe with a petition signed by 21,953 women of Liverpool in support of her cause. Harriet Beecher Stowe then thanked the people of Liverpool for the warmth of her welcome…

I have had not an hour in which to know the heart of a stranger. I have been made to feel at home since the first moment of landing, and wherever I have looked I have seen only the faces of friends.

Harriet Beecher Stowe once again congratulated James Cropper and his extended Dingle family, for initiating the 'abolitionist revival' that led to the total abolition of slavery within the British Empire in 1833.

It is with deep feeling that I have found myself on ground that has been consecrated and made holy by the prayers and efforts of those who first commenced the struggle for that sacred cause which has proved so successful in England, and which I have a solemn assurance will yet be successful in my own country.

— Harriet Beecher Stowe Sunny Memories of Foreign Lands. (1854). p. xviii

== Legacy and the further work of the "Liverpool Dingle Group" of abolitionists ==
Thomas Clarkson speaking at the World Anti-Slavery Society Convention, 1840 by Benjamin Haydon

=== John Cropper (1797–1874) – son of James Cropper ===
James Cropper died just a few months before the first World Anti-Slavery Convention was held in London. His son, John Cropper would attend along with his brother-in-law and Convention organizer Joseph Sturge. In organizing the World's First Anti- Slavery Convention in 1840, Joseph Sturge and the extended 'Dingle Group' had finally succeeded in uniting the major British and American abolitionists.

Garrisonians knew the names of famous British abolitionists—Clarkson, Cropper, Wilberforce, O'Connell—far better than they knew the men themselves. With a few exceptions, personal friendships between Garrisonians and British radicals were rare. That changed after the "World's Convention," which allowed an unprecedented number of Garrisonians to become personally acquainted with British reformers.

— Our Country is the World: Radical Abolitionists Abroad, William Caleb McDaniel, p. 119 (2006)

John Cropper would welcome the American author Harriet Beecher Stowe to Dingle Vale on several occasions. Known as the most generous man in Liverpool, John Cropper was made the subject of Edward Lear's nonsense poem "He Lived at Dingle Bank" and is mentioned in Elizabeth Gaskell's novel Mary Barton (1849). The sandy bay in front of Dingle Bank known as "Knott's Hole down the Dingle" is also claimed to have inspired Kitt's Hole ... down the Dingle in Robert Louis Stevenson's Treasure Island John Cropper had subsidized Thomas Clarkson's abolitionist tour of Great Britain by £100 in 1823 (£13,000 in 2022 values).

=== Edward Cropper (1799–1877) – son of James Cropper ===
Edward Cropper like his brother John was a committed abolitionist and had also subsidized Thomas Clarkson's abolitionist tour of Great Britain by £100 in 1823. As Quakers, the Croppers tended to marry into families of the same religious beliefs and commitment to abolishing the evils of slavery. Edward's first wife, Isabella Wakefield (1801–1830) died at the age of 29 in 1830. Isabella was the sister of John Cropper's wife Anne Wakefield. Edward's second wife, Margaret Macauley (1812–1834) was the daughter of the prominent abolitionist . Margaret Macaulay died of scarlet fever in 1834. Edward's third wife Margaret Denman (1815–1899) was the daughter of the abolitionist Peer Lord Denman. Margaret had previously been married to William Macaulay (1806–1846) the son of the prominent abolitionist Zachary Macaulay, William Macaulay had died at the age of just 40. The marriages of Edward Cropper would serve to widen the influence of the extended Cropper family as a 'Dingle Group' of abolitionists.

=== Eliza Cropper (1800–1835) – daughter of James Cropper. ===
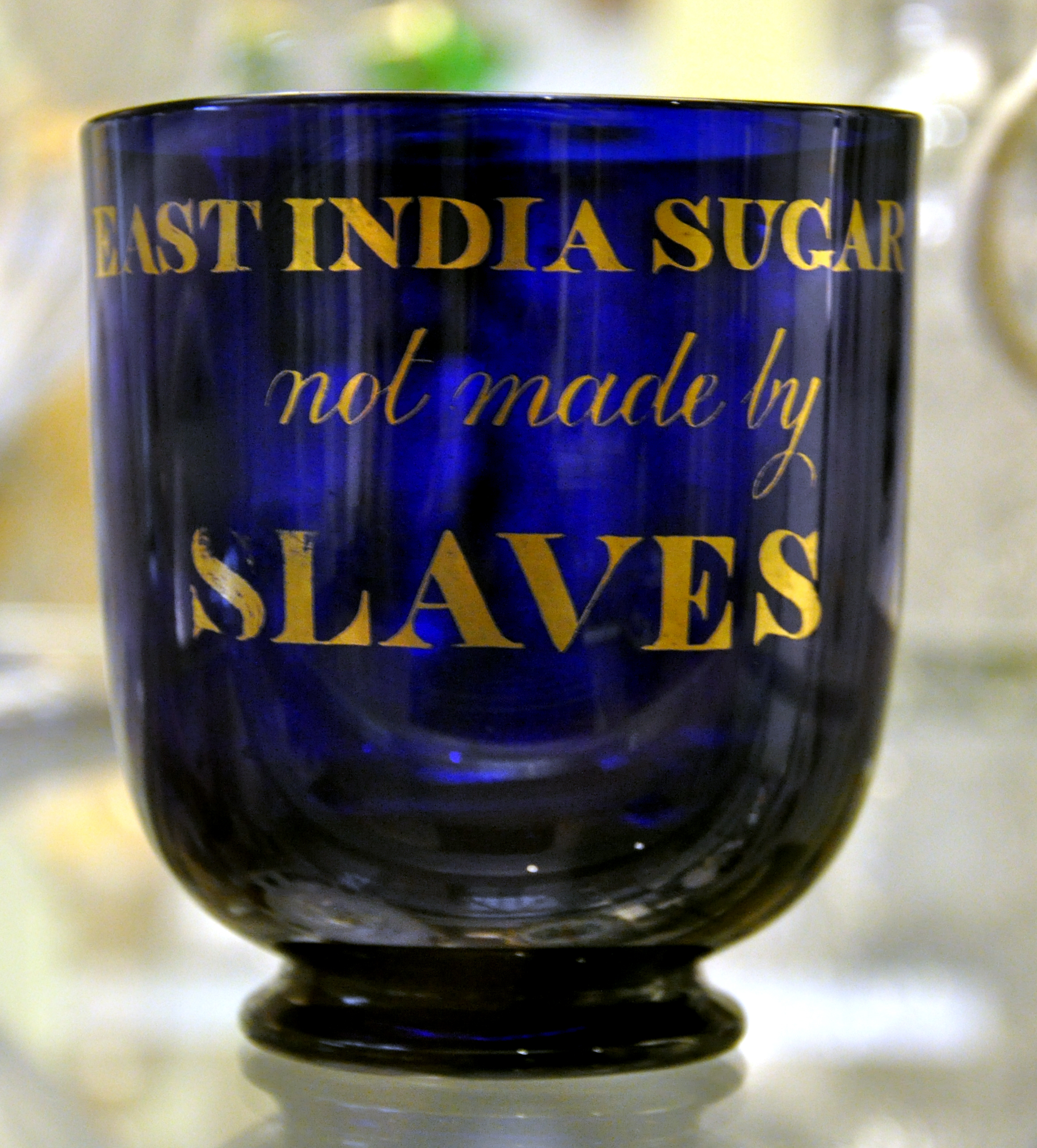
"East India Sugar not made by Slaves" glass sugar bowl of the type promoted by Eliza Cropper

Eliza Cropper was a leading member of the Liverpool Ladies' Anti-Slavery Association, founded in the city in 1827 and gave supported to her father, James Cropper's abolitionist activities. According to Joshua Civin's the Revival of Antislavery in the 1820s at the Local, National, and Global Levels (2001) James Cropper could not have exerted such influence without the help of the ladies of the household. Eliza sent pamphlets to William Lloyd Garrison and others in the United States. Eliza Cropper also developed an Anglo-American women's antislavery and feminist network. It was the female abolitionists who disseminated propaganda aimed at dissuading the use of West Indian sugar. Eliza Cropper was pivotal to the boycott of slave-grown produce and made-up parcels of East-Indies sugar and coffee grown by free labour which were then distributed amongst Members of Parliament. In April 1834 Eliza Cropper had married the abolitionist Joseph Sturge, however on 18 Feb 1835 Eliza died in childbirth, the baby was also lost.

=== Margaret Macauley Cropper (1812–1834) – second wife of Edward Cropper ===
Margaret Macauley Cropper (1812–1834) was the daughter of the abolitionist Zachary Macauley (1768–1838) and the sister of the prominent historian and politician 1st Baron Macaulay (1800–1859) Secretary of War (1839–1841) and Paymaster General (1846–1848). Margaret was the second wife of Edward Cropper and died at the age of 22 in 1834.

=== Margaret Denman Cropper (1815–1899) – third wife of Edward Cropper ===
Margaret Denman Cropper (1815–1899) welcomed the author Harriet Beecher Stowe on her visits to Dingle Bank. Margaret Denman Cropper corresponded at length with the author Charles Dickens over her father, Lord Denman championing Harriet Beecher Stowe's novel Uncle Tom's Cabin. She also corresponded with the freed American slave, orator and politician, Frederick Douglass, sending him presents of the book Dr Livingstone's Travels and a scarf for his wife. Douglass thanked Margaret Cropper for money donated by the Liverpool Anti-slavery Society of which Margaret Cropper was the president.

=== Lord Thomas Denman (1779–1854). Father-in-law of Edward Cropper. ===
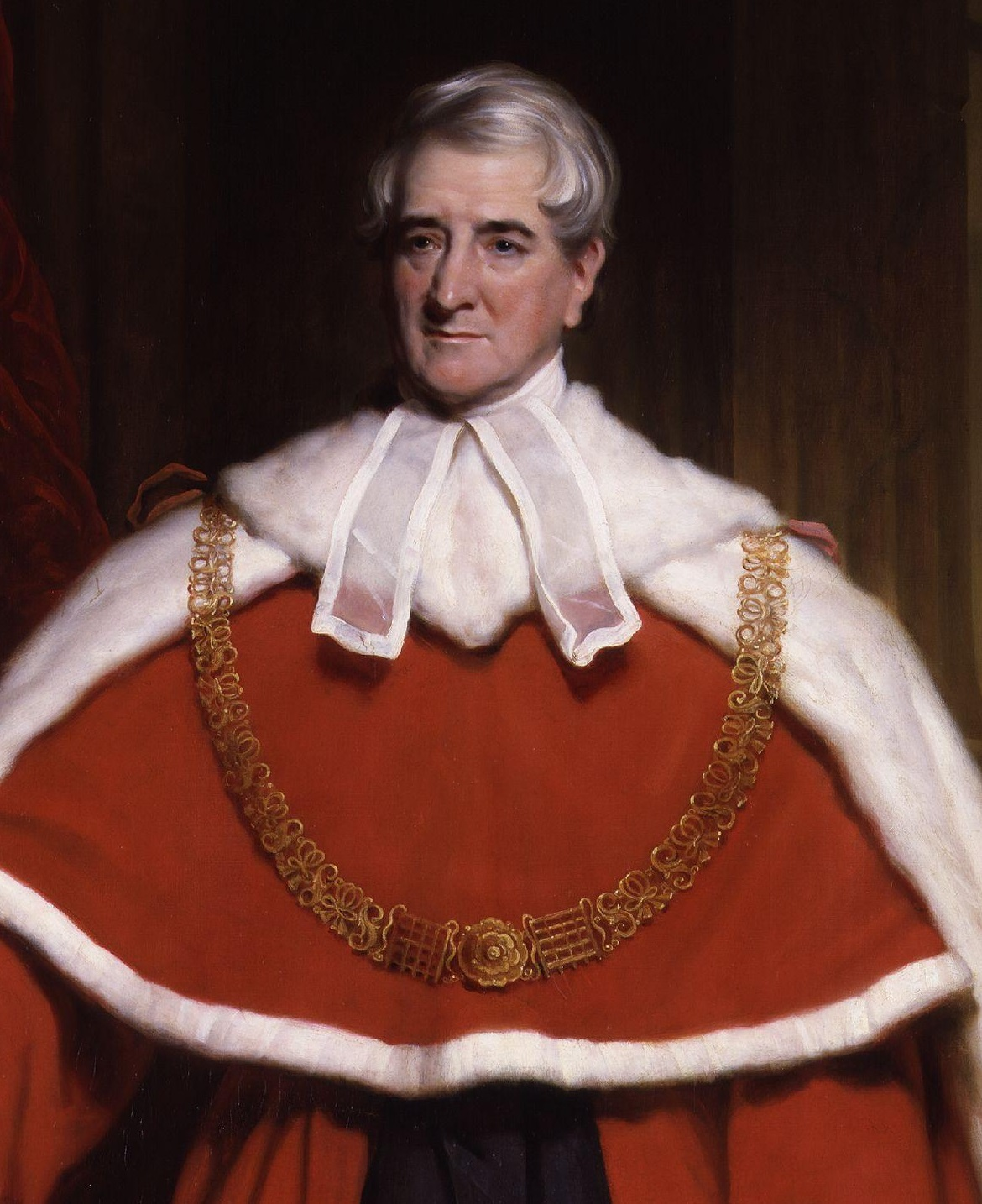
Thomas Denman, 1st Baron Denman by Sir Martin Archer Shee

Lord Thomas Denman (1779–1854) was an abolitionist politician, and Queen Victoria's first Lord Chief Justice between 1837 and 1850. He corresponded with and met Calvin and Harriet Beecher Stowe as early as 1836. Denman's daughter Margaret (1815–99) was married to Edward Cropper of Dingle Vale. In the House of Lords Denman had proposed a motion in favour of black emancipation as early as March 1826 and supported an inquiry into slavery in the West Indies (May 1826). Denman's pamphlet Uncle Tom's Cabin, Bleak House, Slavery and the Slave Trade was instrumental in making Harriet Beecher Stowes antislavery novel Uncle Tom's Cabin the best-selling book of the 19th century and the book that Abraham Lincoln is said to have started the American Civil War.

After his praise for Uncle Tom's Cabin Lord Denman hoped the novel would "Urge abolition as a paramount duty to God; and even in selfish, insolent, cruel, mean, and uncivilised slave states, the cry will prevail, and emancipation will be achieved." Harriet Beecher Stowe would pay her own tribute to Denman ...

When the publication of Uncle Tom's Cabin turned the attention of the British public to the existing horrors of slavery in America, some palliations of the system appeared in English papers. Lord Denman, though then in delicate health and advanced years, wrote a series of letters upon the subject—an exertion which entirely prostrated his before feeble health. ... One of the addresses made at table, a very feeling allusion was made to Lord Denman's labors, and also to those of the honored father of the two Messrs. Cropper.

Harriet Beecher Stowe would also comment on the strong family ties that Lord Denman had with Dingle Bank.

After rambling a while, we came to a beautiful summer house, placed in a retired spot, so as to command a view of the Mersey River. I think they told me that it was Lord Denman's favorite seat. There we sat down, and in common with the young gentlemen and ladies of the family, had quite a pleasant talk together.

— Harriet Beecher Stowe Sunny Memories of Foreign Lands. Volume 1(1854) p. 14 and 17.

=== Rear Admiral Joseph Denman (1810–1874). Brother of Margaret Cropper, brother-in-law of Edward Cropper ===
Rear Admiral Joseph Denman (1810–1874) was Lord Denman's son, the brother of Margaret Denman Cropper of Dingle Bank and the brother-in-law of Edward Cropper. Denman was a Commander in the West Africa Squadron, a Royal Navy squadron set up to intercept slave ships off the west coast of Africa.

In 1839, Denman's sloop HMS Wanderer captured five slave ships in six months and freed their captive cargo. Spanish and Portuguese slavers were still operating on the West African coast – particularly in the Gallinas Kingdom of King Siaka in modern-day Sierra Leone. In November 1840, Sir Richard Doherty, the Governor of Sierra Leone discovered that Prince Mauna, the son of King Siaka, was holding two black British subjects hostage. Governor Doherty ordered Captain Joseph Denman to rescue the mother (Fry Norman) and her child. Denman took three British warships, the Wanderer, Rolla and Saracen and with a force of 120 men, he went on a ruthless and systematic campaign along the African coast, burning 'slave factories' to the ground.

After freeing Fry Norman and her child, Captain Denman unilaterally drafted a treaty abolishing slavery in the Gallinas region and forced King Siaka to sign it. In total Denman destroyed eight slave factories, liberated 841 slaves and secured the expulsion of all slave traders, from the Gallinas Kingdom. One of the slave factories purported to have been destroyed by Denman was that at Lomboko, at the head of the Gallinas River. The Stephen Spielberg film Amistad depicts the destruction of Lomboko and according to Melissa Eisen Azarian (1997),

After the verdict, the fictional character Captain Fitzgerald (Peter Firth) supervises the destruction of Lomboko. In actuality, Commander Joseph Denman led the destruction in 1840, even before the Amistad case went to the Supreme Court.

— The Amistad Mutiny, Melissa Eisen Azarian (2009)

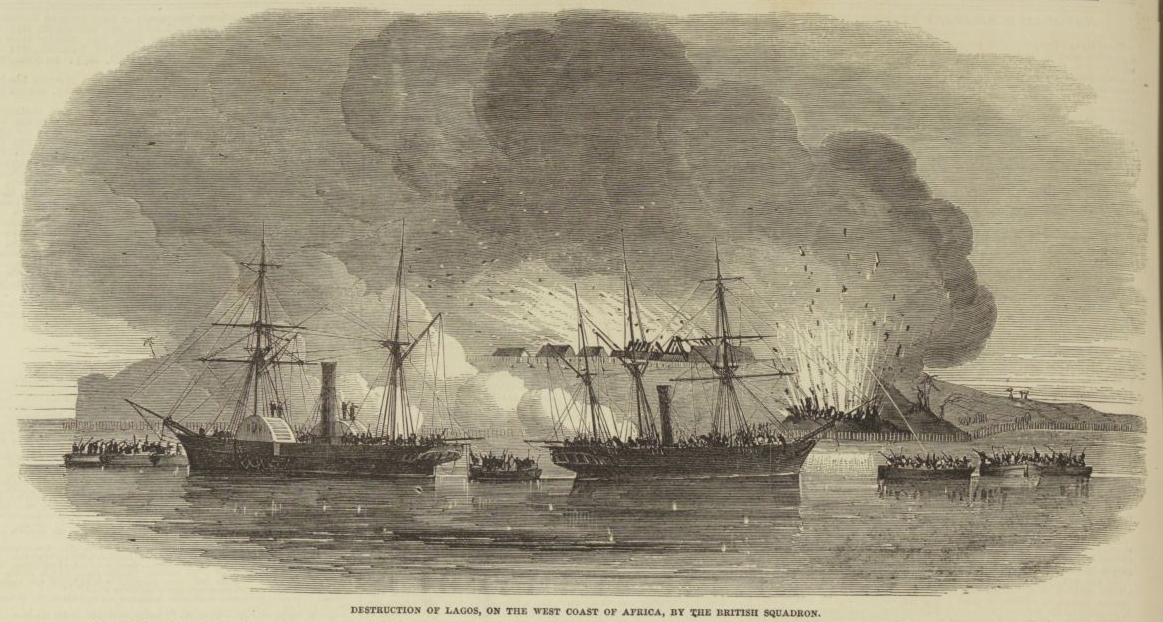
The destruction of the Lagos slave factory "the nest of the slave trade in the Bights" by the West Africa Squadron (Illustrated London News, 13 March 1852)

The burning of the slave factories, almost cost Denman his naval career when he was sued by the slave trader, John Thomas Buron who claimed for 'damages and trespass'. Prosecutors claimed between £100,000 and £500,000, as well as a claim for the refunding of a payment on the 13,000 further slaves that had already been given to inland African tribes. Denman was recalled to Great Britain to face trial and the case of Buron vs Denman was heard in the British Court of Exchequer in 1848 – the court found in Denman's favour. While awaiting trial, Denman drew up detailed instructions for the suppression of the 'Middle Passage' carrying slaves from Africa to the Americas. Denman's anti-slavery plan became government policy in 1844.

The Royal Navy was encouraged to destroy any slave factory they could find and stop any ship that was thought to be a slaver. The newfound powers drafted by Denman saw a sudden and dramatic drop in slave ship numbers on the 'Middle Passage' in the late 1840s and 1850s. By the time the American Civil War started in 1861 the 'Middle Passage' and slave trade had basically come to an end on the west African Coast. Joseph Denman finally ended his career as an admiral in command of the Pacific Squadron. As a favourite of Queen Victoria, Denman acted as the Queen's groom in waiting and commanded her royal yacht, Victoria and Albert, from 1853 to 1860. Joseph Denman's died on 26 November 1874.

== Modern counter narratives on the Dingle Group and Liverpool's contribution to the abolition of slavery ==
Modern commentators have a largely dismissive view of the contribution made by James Cropper, the Dingle Group, and Liverpool to the abolition of slavery in 1833. The narrative tends to focus upon the Slave Trade Act 1807, which did not free a single slave, unlike the far more important and largely Liverpool initiated Abolition of Slavery Act 1833. The view of National Museums Liverpool to the visit of Harriet Beecher Stowe in 1853 in particular, is totally at odds with Harriet Beecher Stowe's own published diary words in her Sunny Memories of Foreign Lands (1854).

Harriet Beecher Stowe had even visited Liverpool in 1853, where she addressed meetings on the evils of slavery. Her liberal views were not well received.

— National Museums Liverpool website (November 2022)

Liverpool's insignificant band of abolitionists … There was, historically, only a very small showing of abolition culture in Europe's foremost slave trading port, especially in the form of overt, public, and vociferous campaigning abolitionists who had been active in other towns and cities.

— Jessica Moody Remembering Slavery in Liverpool, "Slaving Capital of the World" (2020)

Liverpool didn't just take part, but also resisted abolition. It's a fascinating and difficult history.

— Paul Reid, Head of the International Slavery Museum, Liverpool (2022)

== Publications by James Cropper ==
Cropper published many pamphlets on the condition of the West Indies, and on the sugar bounties and other protective duties. His major publications (all issued at Liverpool) were:

- Letters to William Wilberforce, M.P., recommending the cultivation of sugar in our dominions in the East Indies, 1822. Against protectionist duties imposed on sugar from the East Indies or elsewhere, in the interests of the West India slaveowners.
- The Correspondence between John Gladstone, Esq., M.P., and James Cropper, Esq., on the present state of slavery, 1824.
- Present State of Ireland, 1825.
- Cropper, James (1832). A Letter to Thomas Clarkson. Liverpool. (Reviewed in the Quarterly Christian Spectator, Vol. 5 no. 1. March 1833, pp. 145–168.)
