= Henry Conybeare =

English civil engineer and Gothic revival architect

Henry Conybeare (22 February 1823 – 23 January 1892) was an English civil engineer and Gothic revival architect who designed two notable churches and greatly improved the supply of drinking water to Mumbai.

== Early life in England and work in India ==
Conybeare was born at Brislington (now a suburb of Bristol), Somerset. He was the fourth son of William Daniel Conybeare, the eminent geologist and Dean of Llandaff, and the great-grandson of John Conybeare, Bishop of Bristol. He qualified as an engineer and moved to India while still in his twenties to work on the Bombay Great Eastern Railway project. The project was superseded in 1849 by the creation of the Great Indian Peninsula Railway.

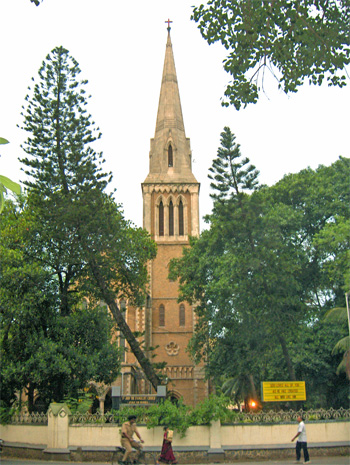
The tower of the Afghan Church, Colaba, Mumbai

Meanwhile, his interest in Gothic architecture led him in 1847 to submit plans for the construction of the Afghan Church in Colaba. The architect originally selected, John Macduff Derick, had already presented his designs to the authorities, but they decided in June 1845 that these were unfit for purpose and the building would cost too much. Conybeare's designs were chosen instead, and the church was eventually consecrated in 1858. The reredos, the Afghan War Memorial mosaics, and the tiles, pews and screen were designed by William Butterfield.

In 1852, Conybeare produced an influential report to the Bombay Board of Conservancy entitled "Report on the Sanitary State and Sanitary Requirements of Bombay". He became Superintendent of Repairs for Bombay, where his plans for a water-supply scheme were accepted in 1855. The Vihar Lake supplied the first piped water to the city in 1860, and its water-works are still in use today.

== Engineering work in Britain ==
Conybeare returned to England, and was elected as a Member of the Institution of Civil Engineers on 2 December 1856. He lived initially in Kew Green and then Chiswick, where his son, Charles F. P. Conybeare, was born, before moving to Duke Street, Westminster (now John Adam Street), and then to Scarsdale Lodge in Kensington. He set up a civil engineering practice, principally engaging in work for railway companies. On 31 July 1858, from his business address in Abingdon Street, Westminster, he was granted patents for "Improved apparatus and machinery for the laying of submarine telegraph cables" and "Improvements in apparatuses for generating and superheating steam and for producing the condensation of steam".

Conybeare's work during this period included:

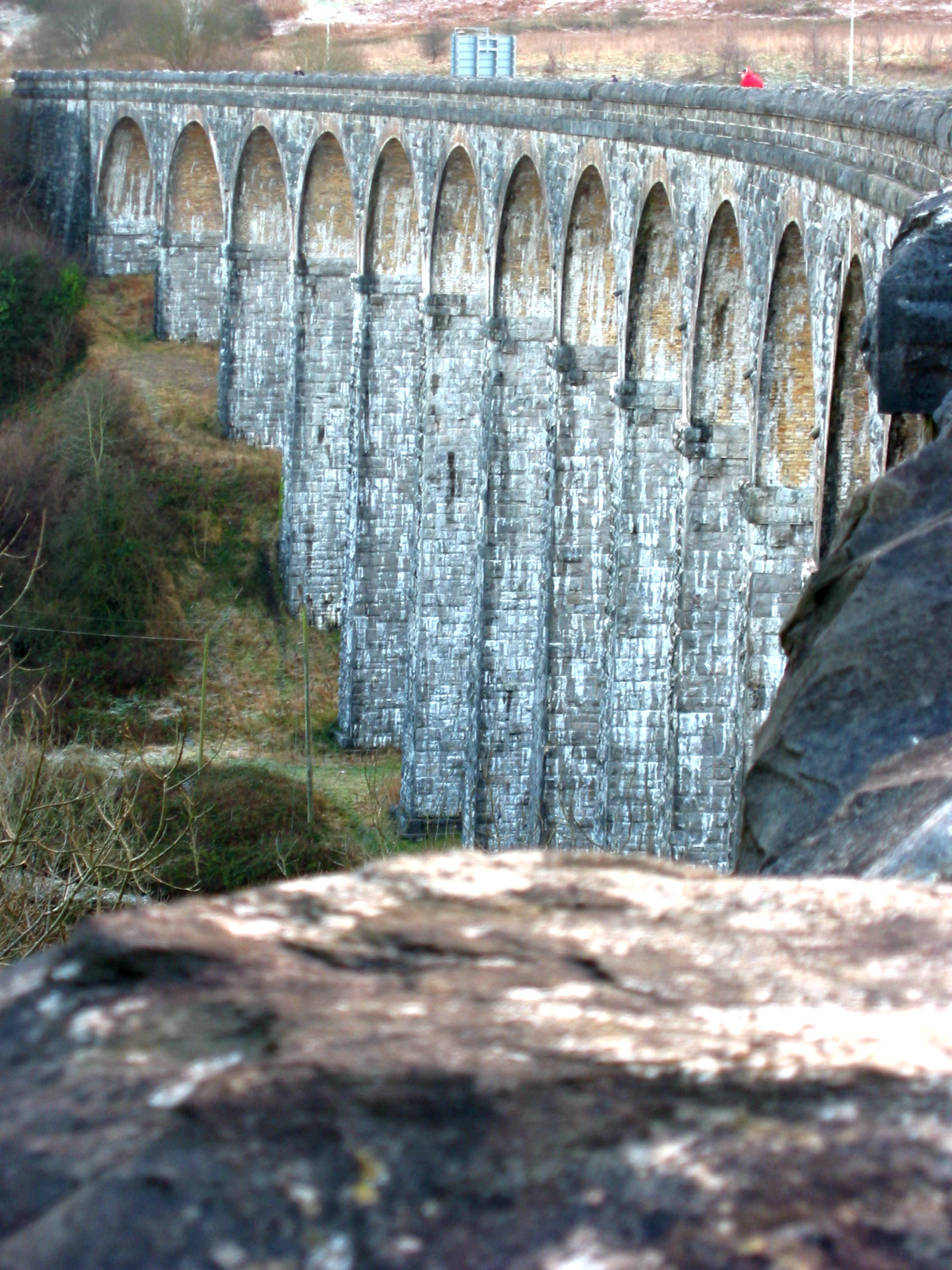
Cefn Coed Viaduct

- 1860: Work on the Chard and Taunton Railway scheme. Powers to build it were granted by an act of parliament in 1861, but nothing was built until the Bristol and Exeter Railway took over the powers and opened the line in September 1866.
- 1860s: Engineer to the West Cork Railway and the Cork & Kinsale Railway during the 1860s. He also designed the railway hotel at Kinsale, but it was never finished.
- 1861: Work on the Brecon and Llandovery Railway
- 1861-2: Work for the Llanelli Railway & Dock Company
- 1863: Work on enlarging the Talyllyn tunnel near Talyllyn Junction, for the Brecon and Merthyr Railway. It had originally been opened as part of the Hay Railway in 1916.
- 1864: Deposited plans for a Southampton and Isle of Wight Railway, intended to pass near Beaulieu Abbey to the Solent. Nothing came of this.
- 1864: With others, engaged by the Sheffield authorities to investigate the Great Sheffield Flood, caused by the breaching of the newly built Dale Dike Reservoir.
- 1866: With Alexander Sutherland, built the Cefn Coed Viaduct, a Grade II* listed building and the third largest viaduct in Wales. It carried the Brecon and Merthyr Railway (now part of the Taff Trail), across the River Taff at Pontycapel, near Cefn-coed-y-cymmer. Sutherland was a friend of Robert Thompson Crawshay of the nearby Cyfarthfa Ironworks, and the viaduct was built on a curve to satisfy conditions laid down by the Crawshay Estate.

== Ecclesiastical work in Britain ==
While working on the above railway schemes, Conybeare continued to promote Gothic architecture. He was involved in plans for three churches and published a book on church design.

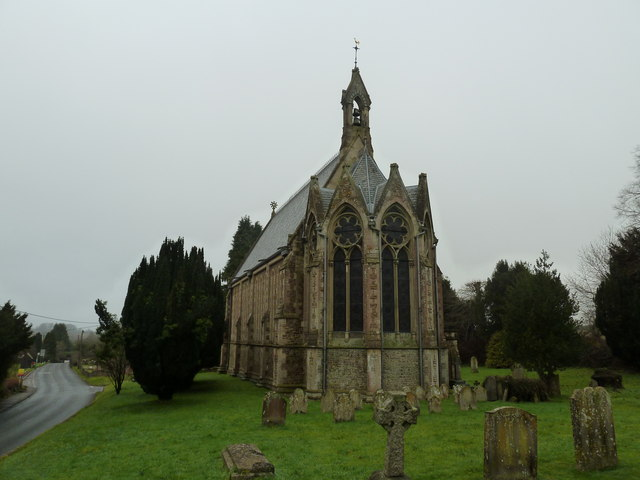
St Mary seen from the east

The first of the three churches, and the only one that exists today, was St Mary's Church, Itchen Stoke, Hampshire (1866), designed by Conybeare at the request of the incumbent, his brother Charles Ranken Conybeare. Its design was influenced by the thirteenth-century Gothic Sainte Chapelle in Paris.

The second church, St Matthias's Church, Warwick Road, Kensington, was originally built in 1869–72 to the designs of John Henry Hakewill (1811–1880), the son of Henry Hakewill. Conybeare made substantial alterations to the church in 1873, probably at his own expense, and also built an adjacent school which was replaced in the 1890s. St Matthias survived until 1958, when it was demolished.

The third church, St Patrick, Kenway Road, was never built.

The book, published in 1868, was entitled The Ten Canons of Proportion and Composition in Gothic Architecture … Practically Applied to the Design of Modern Churches. It was intended to be the first in a series on Gothic architecture, but not many copies were sold and no further volumes were published.

== Final years ==
Conybeare gave up his London architectural practice in 1870 and is believed to have emigrated to Venezuela in 1878, dying in Caracas in 1884.

He is remembered on a family grave in Brompton Cemetery, London.
