= James Cropper plc =

English papermaking company

- Industry: Papermaking
- Founded: 1845
- Founder: James Cropper (1823–1900)
- Headquarters: Burneside, Kendal, England
- Key people: James Cropper (Hon. Pres.); Mark Cropper (Chairman); Steve Adams (CEO)
- Products: paper, advanced materials
- Website: www.jamescropper.com

James Cropper plc is an English papermaking and advanced materials company based in Burneside, Kendal, Cumbria, England. The company was founded in 1845 by James Cropper (1823–1900), whose great-great-grandson James Cropper is the Honorary President of the company.

The company have been at the same site at Burneside since 1845. There were earlier mills on the same site including a sickle mill and a fulling mill which were bought in 1750 by John Wakefield who built a woollen mill on the site in 1760 and converted the sickle mill for cotton 1770. In 1828 the mill was leased to Hudson and Forster who installed second-hand papermaking machines, and in 1845 James Cropper rented the premises.

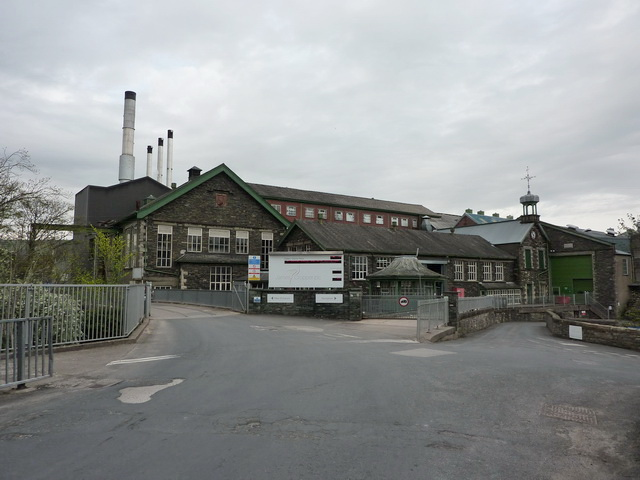
The mill seen in 2010

Croppers have pioneered the recycling of disposable coffeecups, and have also produced a range of recycled paper for the luxury packaging market.

The company produces specialist paper for the manufacture of The Royal British Legion's Remembrance poppies: when a decision was made in 1978 to move from fabric to paper poppies, Croppers produced a paper which could be crimped into shape and with colour which could be sure not to rub off onto clothing.

A historian was commissioned to write a history of the company but failed to deliver, at which point the current chairman Mark Cropper (great-x-3-grandson of the founder) stepped in to write The Leaves We Write On: James Cropper, a History in Paper-Making (Ellergreen, 2004: ISBN 0954919114).

In 2021 the company entered a three-year agreement as "headline sponsors" of the Wainwright Prize for nature and conservation writing.
