= William Drury (died 1558) =

English politician

Sir William Drury
- Born: c. 1500
- Died: 11 January 1558 (aged 57–58); Hawstead, Suffolk
- Spouses: Jane St Maur; Elizabeth Sothill
- Parent(s): Sir Robert Drury, Anne Calthorpe

Sir William Drury (c. 1500 – 11 January 1558) was an English politician who was a Member of Parliament and a Privy Councillor. He was the son and heir of Sir Robert Drury. His name appears in the Ellesmere manuscript of Chaucer's Canterbury Tales.

== Family ==
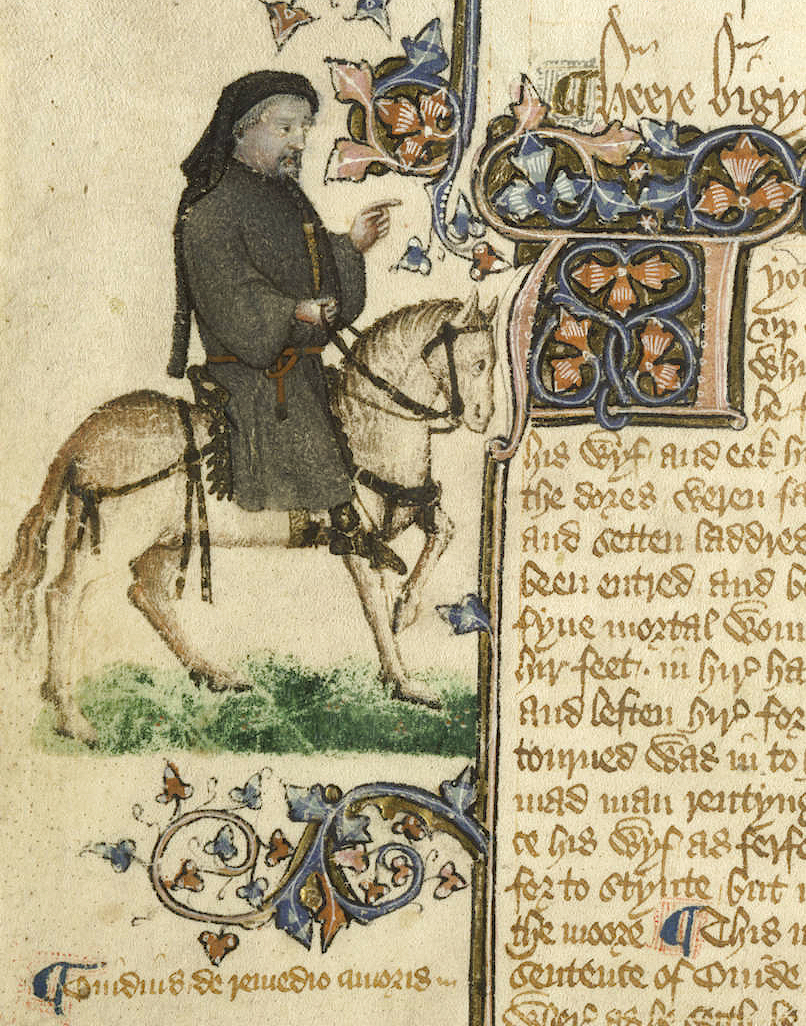
Geoffrey Chaucer from the Ellesmere manuscript

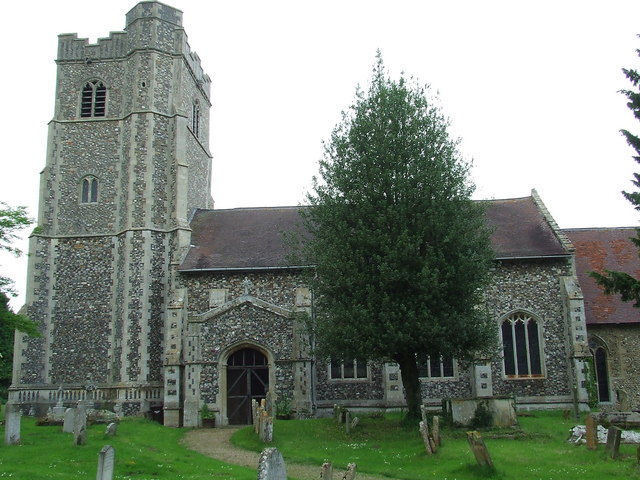
All Saints Church, Hawstead, where Sir William Drury is buried

William Drury, born about 1500, was the elder son of Sir Robert Drury, Speaker of the House of Commons, and Anne Calthorpe, daughter of Sir William Calthorpe of Burnham Thorpe, Norfolk. He had a younger brother, and four sisters:

- Sir Robert Drury (c.1503–1577) of Hedgerley, Buckinghamshire, who married Elizabeth Brudenell, the daughter of Edmund Brudenell of Hedgerley and Chalfont St Peter, Buckinghamshire, by whom he was the father of Sir Robert Drury (1525–1593), Sir William Drury (2 October 1527 – 13 October 1579) and Sir Dru Drury (1531/2–1617).
- Anne Drury, who married firstly George Waldegrave, esquire (c.1483 – 8 July 1528) of Smallbridge, Suffolk, and secondly Sir Thomas Jermyn (c.1500 – 1552) of Rushbrooke, Suffolk.
- Elizabeth Drury, who married, in 1510, Sir Philip Boteler.
- Bridget Drury, who married Sir John Jerningham. They were maternal grandparents of Thomas Cornwallis.
- Ursula Drury, who married Sir Giles Alington of Horseheath, Cambridgeshire.

== Career ==
Drury was admitted to Lincoln's Inn on 12 February 1517, and entered the service of King Henry VIII before his father's death. In 1521 he accompanied Cardinal Wolsey to Calais. He was knighted in 1533 at the coronation of Anne Boleyn. In 1536 he was High Sheriff of Suffolk and Norfolk, and in the same year equipped 100 men to accompany the King's forces under Thomas Howard, 3rd Duke of Norfolk, at the time of the Pilgrimage of Grace. In 1539 he was a commissioner for the defence of the coast of Suffolk. In the following year he was appointed a Groom of the Privy Chamber when Anne of Cleves arrived in England as Henry VIII's fourth bride. In 1544 he was again appointed High Sheriff of Suffolk and Norfolk.

During the succession crisis after the death of King Edward VI, although he had been expected to aid Northumberland in his attempt to place Lady Jane Grey on the throne, Drury instead threw his support behind Princess Mary, and was appointed to the Privy Council early in Mary's reign.

As noted in the Guide to Medieval and Renaissance Manuscripts in the Huntington Library, Drury's name appears on folio i verso of the Ellesmere manuscript of Chaucer's Canterbury Tales:

On f. i verso, s. XVI2/4, “Robertus drury miles [space], William drury miles, Robertus drury miles, domina Jarmin, domina Jarningam, dommina Alington,” referring to Sir Robert Drury (mentioned above as executor; speaker of the House of Commons in 1495 and a member of Henry VIII's Council), to his sons William and Robert, and to his 3 daughters: Anna, married first to George Waldegrave, and after his death in 1528 to Sir Thomas Jermyn; Bridget, married to Sir John Jernyngham (Jernegan, of Somerleyton); Ursula (d. 1521), married to Sir Giles Alington.

Drury made his last will on 26 December 1557, a few days after the sudden death of his eldest son and heir, Robert. He died at Hawstead on 11 January 1558. His will was proved 29 April 1558. His widow, Elizabeth, died 19 May 1575, leaving a will proved 7 November 1575. Drury was buried in All Saints Church, Hawstead, where he is commemorated by a memorial brass and an inscription:

Whilst he lived here was loved of every wight.

Such temperance he did retain, such courtesy,
Such noble mind with justice joined, such liberality,

As fame itself shall sound for me the glory of his name.

Drury's heir was his grandson, Sir William Drury.

== Marriages and children ==
Drury married firstly, before 7 February 1516, Jane Saint Maur, daughter and heiress of Sir William Saint Maur of Beckington, Somerset, by Margaret, daughter of Sir Richard Edgecombe. She died in childbirth in 1517, and there were no issue of the marriage.

Drury married secondly, before February 1521, Elizabeth Sothill (c.1505 – 19 May 1575), one of the twin daughters and co-heirs of Henry Sothill, esquire, of Stoke Faston, Leicestershire, and Joan Empson, daughter of Sir Richard Empson, by whom he had four sons and thirteen daughters:

- Robert Drury (13 February 1524 – 7 December 1557), esquire, who married Audrey Rich, daughter of Richard Rich, 1st Baron Rich, Lord Chancellor of England, by whom he had four sons, including Sir William Drury, and eight daughters.
- William Drury.
- Henry Drury (born 6 April 1539), who married Elizabeth Isaac.
- Roger Drury (born 24 March 1540).
- Anne Drury (19 August 1523 – 5 September 1561), who married, by 1540, as his first wife, Sir Christopher Heydon (1518/19 – 10 December 1579) of Baconsthorpe Castle, Norfolk. by whom she had three sons, Sir William Heydon (d.1594), Henry, and Christopher, and four daughters, Mary, who married Thomas Blennerhasset, esquire, of Barsham, Suffolk; Ursula, who married Sir Roger Townshend; Elizabeth, who married Sir John Wentworth of Mountneys, Essex; and Jane.
- Mary Drury (30 June 1526 – c. 16 June 1594), who married firstly Sir Richard Corbet (May 1524 – before 24 June 1565) of Assington, Suffolk, and secondly, on 24 June 1565 at Hawstead, John Tyrrell, esquire, of Gipping, Suffolk. Mary Drury was buried at Cotton, Suffolk on 16 June 1594, and left a will proved 29 June 1594.
- Elizabeth Drury.
- Frances Drury (born 29 June 1532), who married James Hobart, esquire, of Hales Hall.
- Bridget Drury (born 11 September 1554), who married Henry Yelverton, esquire, of Rougham, Norfolk.
- Winifred Drury.
- Ursula Drury.
- Audrey Drury.
- Dorothy Drury.
- Margaret Drury.
- Katherine Drury.
- Dorothy Drury (again) (born 4 March 1537 – 1602), who married Robert Rookwood (d. 17 February 1600) of Coldham, by whom she was the mother of four sons, including Ambrose Rookwood, one of the conspirators in the Gunpowder Plot.
- Elizabeth Drury (again), who married Sir Robert Drury of Rougham, Suffolk.
