= Drue Drury (courtier) =

English politician and courtier (c. 1531–1617)

Sir Drue Drury (c. 1531 – 29 April 1617) was an English courtier and politician who sat in the House of Commons at various times between 1562 and 1584.

== Early life ==
Drury was the fifth but third surviving son of Sir Robert Drury of Hedgerley, Buckinghamshire, and Elizabeth Brudenell, the daughter of Edmund Brudenell of Chalfont St Peter, Buckinghamshire. He was the grandson of Sir Robert Drury who was Speaker of the House of Commons. He was a brother of Sir Robert Drury (1525–1593) and Sir William Drury (2 October 1527 – 13 October 1579). and nephew of Sir William Drury.

Drury matriculated from St Edmund's Hostel, Cambridge in autumn 1544.

== Public life ==
Drury was elected Member of Parliament for Mitchell in 1559 and for Camelford in 1562. He was High Sheriff of Norfolk in 1576. During the reigns of Elizabeth and James I he was gentleman usher of the privy chamber. He seems to have kept in the good graces of the queen, except on one occasion. In September 1579 he was knighted at Wanstead, Essex. He was elected MP for Norfolk in 1584. and appointed custos rotulorum for the county in 1583. In November 1586 he was sent to Fotheringay to assist Sir Amias Paulet in the wardership of Mary, Queen of Scots. He was nominated Lieutenant of the Tower of London in 1596.

Drury died at his seat at Riddlesworth, Norfolk, aged about eighty-six, though on his monument the age of ninety-nine is given. His will of 7 July 1613 was proved in P.C.C. 31 May 1617 (registered 39, Weldon).

William Camden described Drury as a sincere, honest man, and a puritan in his religion.

== Family ==
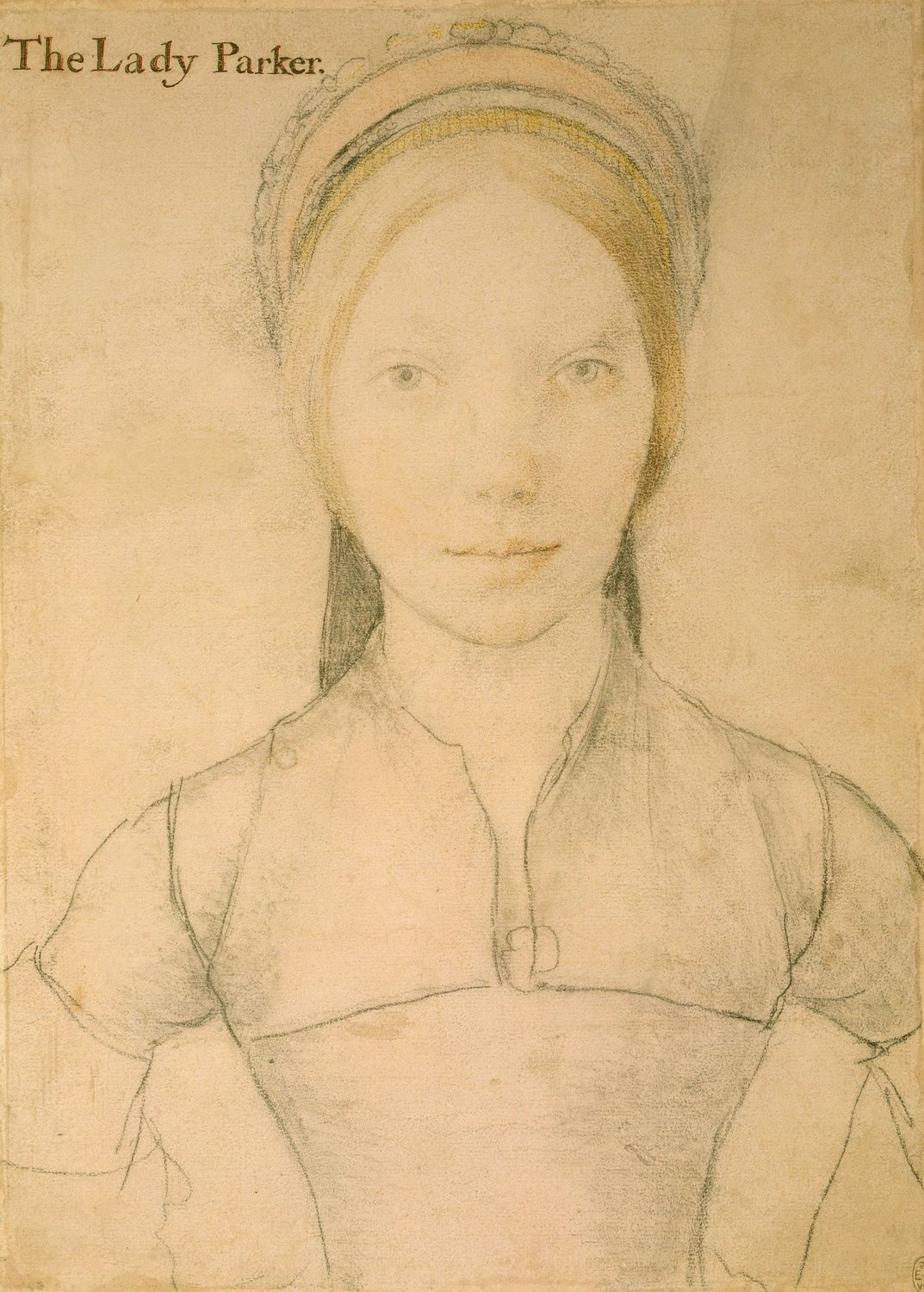
The Lady Parker. Possibly Elizabeth Calthorpe, the first cousin of Anne Boleyn, and the first cousin once removed of Queen Elizabeth I

Drury married, firstly, Elizabeth, daughter of Sir Philip Calthorpe, by Amata Boleyn, the daughter of William Boleyn and the aunt of Anne Boleyn, making Elizabeth the first cousin of Anne Boleyn and first cousin once removed of Elizabeth I. Elizabeth Calthorpe was the widow of Sir Henry Parker, knight, the son and heir of Henry Parker, 10th Baron Morley, and of Sir William Woodhouse of Waxham, Norfolk.

She brought him a moiety of Riddlesworth. In 1582 he married for his second wife Katherine Finch, daughter and heiress of William Finch of Lynsted, Kent. Through her, he acquired the manor of Sewards in Linstead, and Perry Court at Preston, Kent. He had an only son, Drue Drury, who was created a baronet and three daughters; Elizabeth who married Sir Thomas Wingfield and then Henry Reynolds, Anne who married Sir Robert Boteler, and Frances. Drury was a younger brother of Sir William Drury.

Some correspondence between Drury and his second wife and Sir Julius Cæsar, which was written in 1588, 1596, and 1603–1614, is held in the Lansdowne collection in the British Library.

Drury is to be distinguished from a Drue Drury of Eccles and Rollesby, Norfolk, who married Anne, daughter and coheiress of Thomas Burgh, 3rd Baron Burgh, and was knighted at Whitehall on 23 July 1603, before the coronation of King Charles I.

== Notes ==
Parliament of England
Preceded by John Arundell; Thomas Gardiner	Member of Parliament for Mitchell; 1559; With: Robert Colshill	Succeeded by Robert Hopton; Thomas Wilson
Preceded by John Smith; Sir Thomas Chamberlain	Member of Parliament for Camelford; 1562; With: William Patridge	Succeeded by Nicholas Prideaux; Edward Williams
Preceded by Henry Woodhouse; Sir Roger Woodhouse	Member of Parliament for Norfolk; 1586; With: Nathaniel Bacon	Succeeded by Thomas Farmer; William Gresham
