= William Gascoigne (died 1540) =

(by 1485–1540) of Cardington, Beds

Sir William Gascoigne (by 1485 – 1540) of Cardington, Bedfordshire was an English Member of Parliament.

He was born the son of George Gascoigne of Cardington.

He was appointed High Sheriff of Bedfordshire and Buckinghamshire for 1506–07, 1513–14 and 1517–18 and High Sheriff of Northamptonshire for 1518–19. He was knighted in France at 1520 when attending Henry VIII at the Field of the Cloth of Gold and was also present in 1522 at the state visit of the emperor Charles V.

He served Cardinal Wolsey as treasurer of the cardinal's household from 1523 to the cardinal's downfall in 1529 and afterwards served as steward to John Neville, 3rd Baron Latimer. He represented Bedfordshire in Parliament as a knight of the shire in 1529 and 1536.

On his death in 1540, he was buried at Cardington. He had married twice, with his first marriage being with Elizabeth, the daughter and heiress of John Winter of Cardington, by whom he inherited his Cardington estate and with whom he had his only son and heir, Sir John Gascoigne. His second marriage was with Elizabeth, the daughter of Sir John Pennington of Muncaster, Cumberland, and the widow of Sir Walter Strickland and Sir Richard Cholmley. He was succeeded by Sir John.

Political offices
Preceded by John Cheyne	High Sheriff of Bedfordshire and Buckinghamshire; 1506–1507	Succeeded by Sir John Longueville
Preceded by Thomas Dynham	High Sheriff of Bedfordshire and Buckinghamshire; 1513–1514	Succeeded by Sir Edmund Braye
Preceded by Sir George Harvey	High Sheriff of Bedfordshire and Buckinghamshire; 1517–1518	Succeeded by Michael Fisher
Preceded by William Parr	High Sheriff of Northamptonshire; 1518–1519	Succeeded by Thomas Lucy
Parliament of England
Unknown	Member of Parliament for Bedfordshire; 1529–1539; With: George Acworth 1529–1530; Sir John St. John aft. 1532 – 1536; Unknown 1536–1539	Succeeded by Sir John St. John; John Gostwick
