= Robert Drury (died 1577) =

Sir Robert Drury
- Born: c. 1503
- Died: 21 May 1577 (aged 73–74); Hedgerley, Buckinghamshire
- Spouse: Elizabeth Brudenell
- Children: 9, including William and Drue
- Parent: Sir Robert Drury (father)

Sir Robert Drury (c. 1503 – 21 May 1577) was an English politician who was Member of Parliament for Buckinghamshire. He was the son of Sir Robert Drury, and was the father of Sir William Drury and Sir Drue Drury.

Drury's name appears in the Ellesmere manuscript of Chaucer's Canterbury Tales.

== Early life and family ==
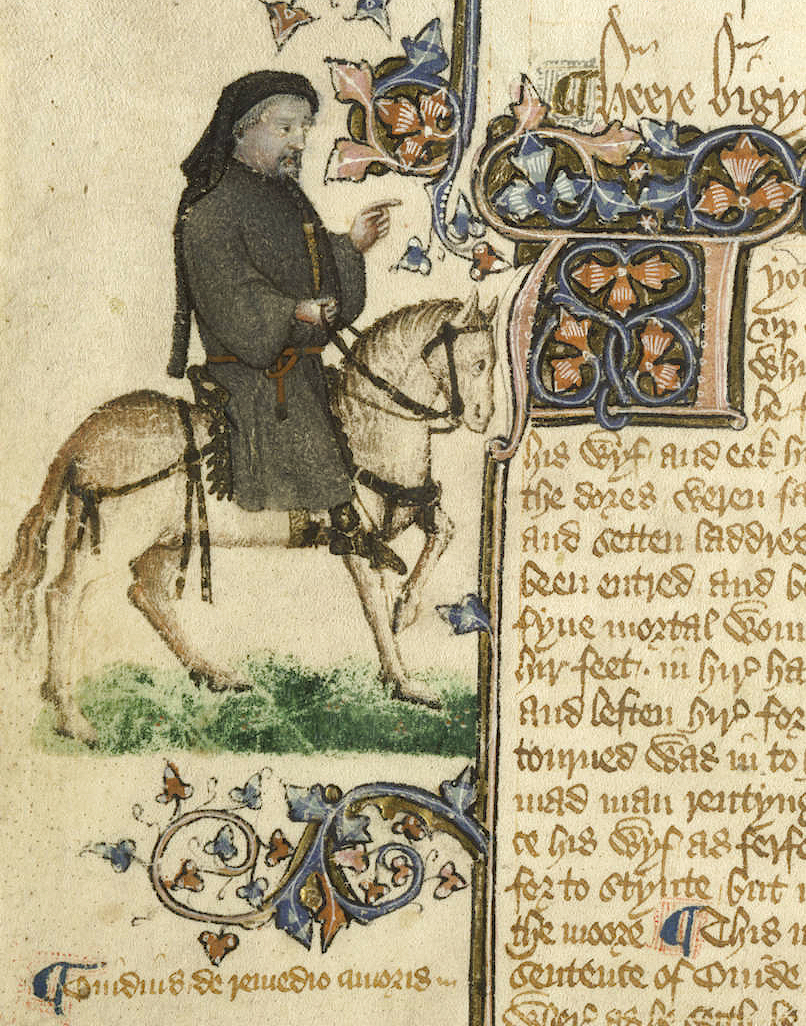
Geoffrey Chaucer from the Ellesmere manuscript

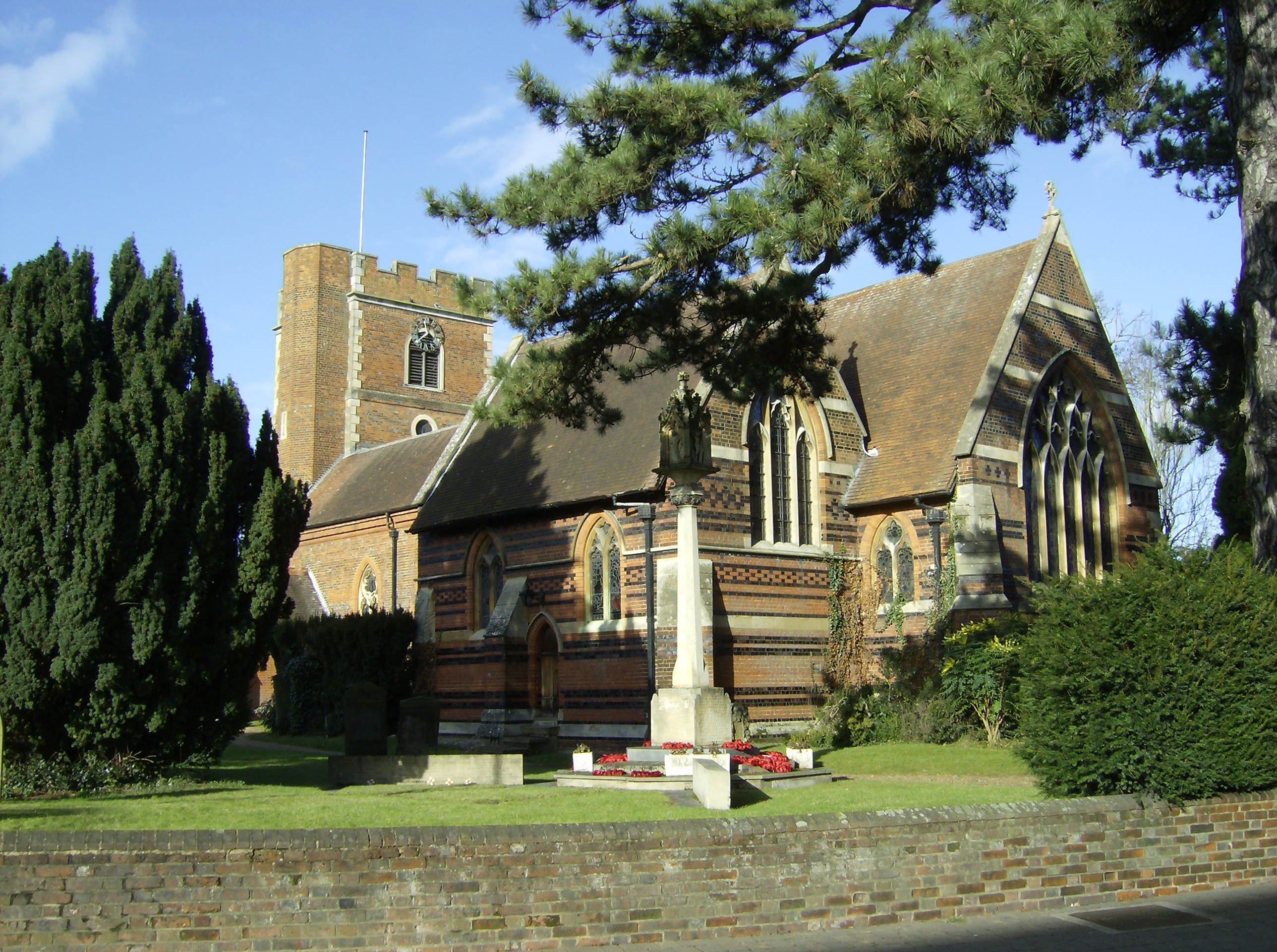
Church of Chalfont St Peter where Sir Robert Drury is buried

Drury was born about 1503, the second son of Sir Robert Drury, Speaker of the House of Commons, and Anne Calthorpe, daughter of Sir William Calthorpe of Burnham Thorpe, Norfolk. He had an elder brother and four sisters: William, Anne, Elizabeth, Bridget, and Ursula. Sir Philip Boteler was his brother-in-law through his marriage to Elizabeth. Another brother-in-law was Sir Giles Alington who married Ursula. Bridget's daughters, Anne and Elizabeth, married Sir Thomas Cornwallis and Sir John Sulyard, respectively.

== Career ==
Drury was admitted to Lincoln's Inn on 12 February 1522. However, his marriage to an heiress shortly thereafter is said to have "spared him the need to practise law". He was appointed as a Justice of the Peace in Buckinghamshire from 1534 to 1543 and again in 1554, and served on numerous commissions in that county. In 1544-45 he was appointed escheator for Bedfordshire and Buckinghamshire, and in 1546–47, 1555–56 and 1561–62, was High Sheriff of Bedfordshire and Buckinghamshire.

In 1538 a manor owned by Drury's father-in-law, Edmund Brudenell, came into Drury's hands, and he augmented the property by purchasing neighbouring monastic lands and other properties. In 1538, he purchased the manor of Temple Bulstrode in Hedgerley, and, in 1541, the chief manor in Chalfont St Peter. In 1556 he was granted licence to empark 400 acres at Hedgerley.

In addition to his activities in local government, Drury attended court on state occasions, served with the King's forces at the time of the Pilgrimage of Grace in 1536, participated as a commissioner when Henry Pole, 1st Baron Montagu, Sir Edward Neville and others were tried for treason in 1538, and in 1544 was in the forces mustered to serve in Henry VIII's war against France. He is said to have been knighted by August 1548.

Perhaps as a result of Catholic sympathies, Drury did not serve as a Justice of the Peace during the reign of King Edward VI. He was among the first to support Mary Tudor's claim to the throne in July 1553, and was later awarded a pension of £66 13s 4d for his service in her cause.

In October 1533, he sat as one of the two Knights of the Shire for Buckinghamshire in the first Parliament of Mary's reign. His son, Robert, was elected as MP for Chipping Wycombe in the same Parliament. He was among the noblemen, members of the gentry, and divines who attended when Archbishop Thomas Cranmer was tried for heresy in 1555. In 1564, six years after Queen Elizabeth's accession, he was termed a 'hinderer of religion', but in 1569 accepted the Act of Uniformity in connection with his appointment to a commission of the peace.

As noted in the Guide to Medieval and Renaissance Manuscripts in the Huntington Library, Drury's name appears on folio i verso of the Ellesmere manuscript of Chaucer's Canterbury Tales:

On f. i verso, s. XVI2/4, "Robertus drury miles [space], William drury miles, Robertus drury miles, domina Jarmin, domina Jarningam, dommina Alington", referring to Sir Robert Drury (mentioned above as executor; speaker of the House of Commons in 1495 and a member of Henry VIII’s Council), to his sons William and Robert, and to his 3 daughters: Anna, married first to George Waldegrave, and after his death in 1528 to Sir Thomas Jermyn; Bridget, married to Sir John Jernyngham (Jernegan, of Somerleyton); Ursula (d. 1521), married to Sir Giles Alington.

Drury made his last will on 12 and 28 April 1577, requesting burial by his wife in the church of Chalfont St Peter. Drury named his three surviving sons, Robert, Sir William and Drue as executors, and appointed as supervisors Sir William Cordell, Master of the Rolls, Sir Thomas Cornwallis, Sir Christopher Heydon, and his son-in-law, Robert Woodleaf. Drury died at Hedgerley on 21 May.

== Marriage and issue ==
Drury married by 1524, Elizabeth Brudenell (d. 12 December 1542), daughter of Edmund Brudenell of Chalfont St Peter, by whom he was the father of five sons and four daughters:

- Robert Drury (1525–1593), esquire, eldest son and heir, who married, by 1544, Anne Boorman or Bowerman, the daughter of Nicholas Boorman or Bowerman of Brook in the Isle of Wight and his wife Anne or Elizabeth Russell, sister of John Russell, 1st Earl of Bedford, by whom he had two sons and three daughters.
- Sir William Drury (2 October 1527 – 13 October 1579), who married, on 10 October 1560, Margaret, the daughter of Thomas Wentworth, 1st Baron Wentworth, and widow of John Williams, 1st Baron Williams of Thame, by whom he had three daughters.
- Sir Drue Drury (1531/2–1617), who married firstly, about 1565, Elizabeth Calthorpe, the daughter and heir of Sir Philip Calthorpe of Cockthorpe, Norfolk, by whom he had no issue, and secondly, in 1582, Katherine Finch (d.1601), the daughter and heir of William Finch of Lynsted, Kent, by whom he had one son and three daughters.
- Roger Drury, who died without issue.
- Edmund Drury, of Horton, Buckinghamshire: his son Robert settled in Ireland and was the ancestor of the prominent King family, who had the title Earl of Kingston.
- Anne Drury, who married Robert Woodleif or Woodleaf (by 1516–93), esquire, of Aylesbury and Great Missenden, Buckinghamshire.
- Margaret Drury, who married, as his second wife, Henry Trenchard, esquire.
- Lucy Drury, who married Robert Tesche, gentleman.
- Elizabeth Drury, who married Rowland Hynde, esquire, of Hedsworth, Buckinghamshire.

== Notes ==
Political offices
Preceded by Lewis Dyve	High Sheriff of Bedfordshire and Buckinghamshire; 1546–1547	Succeeded by Sir Francis Russell
Preceded by Arthur Longueville	High Sheriff of Bedfordshire and Buckinghamshire; 1555–1556	Succeeded by Robert Peckham
Preceded by Thomas Tyringham	High Sheriff of Bedfordshire and Buckinghamshire; 1561–1562	Succeeded by John Goodwin
