= George Peckham (disambiguation) =

George Peckham (born 1942) is an English record engineer

George Peckham may also refer to:

- George Peckham (merchant) (died 1608), English merchant venturer
- George Williams Peckham (1845–1914), American teacher, taxonomist, ethologist, arachnologist, and entomologist
