= William Drury =

English politician and soldier (1527–1579)

Sir William Drury
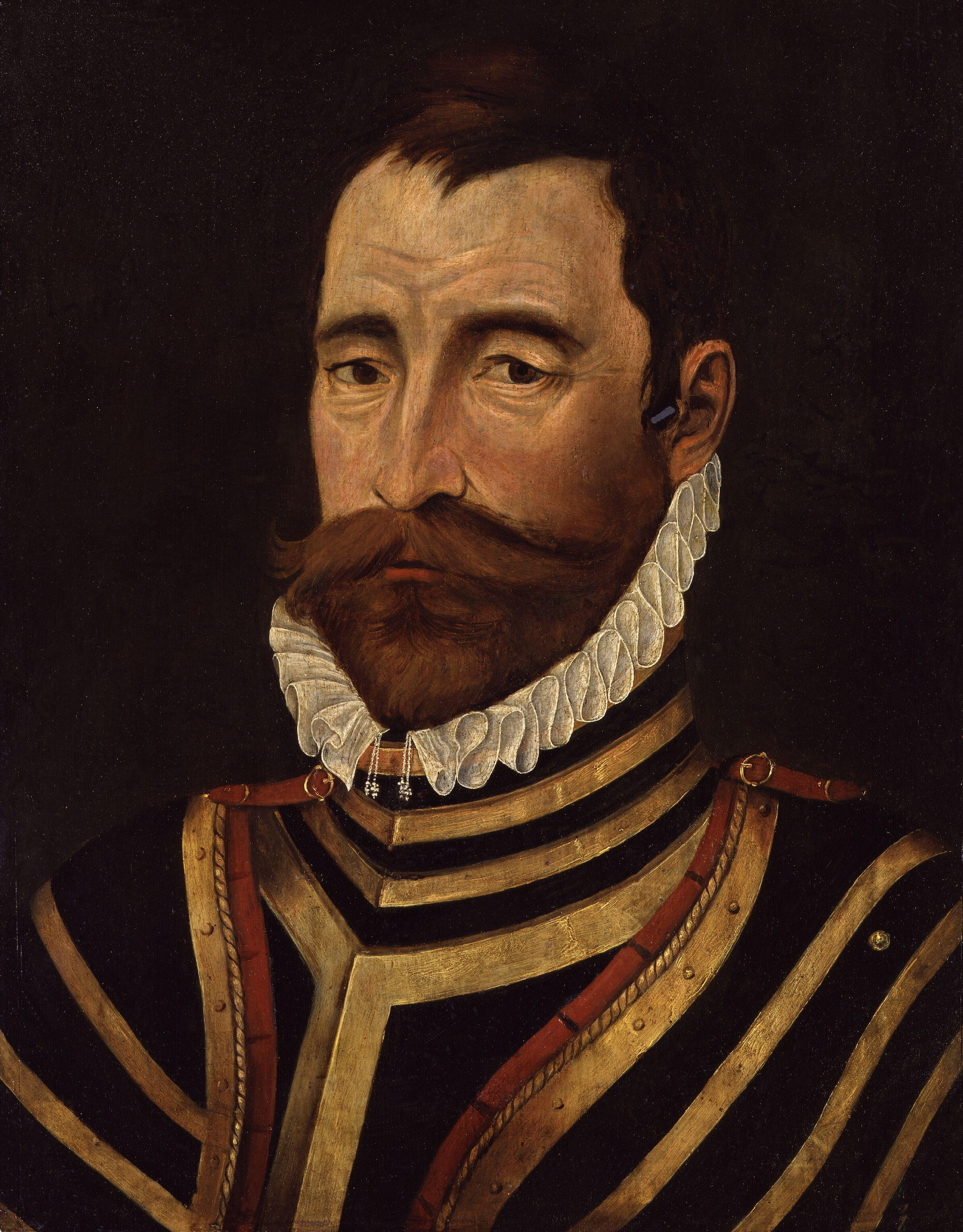
- Portrait by an unknown artist
- Born: 2 October 1527; Hawstead, Suffolk, England
- Died: 13 October 1579 (aged 52); Waterford, Munster, Ireland
- Spouse: Margaret Wentworth (m. 1560)
- Children: 3
- Parents: Robert Drury (father); Elizabeth Brudenell (mother)

Sir William Drury (2 October 1527 – 13 October 1579) was an English statesman and soldier.

== Family ==
William Drury, born at Hawstead in Suffolk on 2 October 1527, was the third son of Sir Robert Drury (c. 1503–1577) of Hedgerley, Buckinghamshire, and Elizabeth Brudenell, of Chalfont St Peter, Buckinghamshire. He was the grandson of another Sir Robert Drury (c. 1456–2 March 1535), Speaker of the House of Commons in 1495. He was a brother of Sir Robert Drury (1525–1593) and Sir Drue Drury (1531/2–1617).

== Career ==
Drury was educated at Gonville College, Cambridge. Fighting in France, Drury was taken prisoner in 1544; then after his release, he helped Lord Russell, afterwards Earl of Bedford, to quell a rising in Devonshire in 1549, but he did not come to the front until the reign of Elizabeth I. In 1554 he sat as Member of Parliament for Chipping Wycombe.

=== Berwick and Scotland ===
In 1559, he was sent to Edinburgh to report on the condition of Scottish politics, and five years later he became Marshal and deputy-governor of Berwick-upon-Tweed. He was a close observer of the affairs of Mary, Queen of Scots and her house-arrest in Lochleven Castle, and was in constant communication with William Cecil. Drury also sent Cecil building stone, including materials for two chimneys shipped in the Pelican of London.

Before the trial of the Earl of Bothwell for the murder of Lord Darnley on 12 April 1567, Drury came to Holyrood Palace with a letter for Queen Mary from Elizabeth I. He waited in the palace forecourt and was told that Mary was asleep, but a servant of the French ambassador Philibert du Croc pointed at Mary and her companion Mary Fleming looking out of a window.

Drury sent reports about the activities of Regent Moray in Scotland. Moray was short of funds, so "bare of money" in September, that Drury heard he planned to pawn or sell Mary's jewels. In January 1568, Moray had demolished an artillery fortress on Inchkeith but could not slight Dunbar Castle because of prohibitive costs. He mentioned a custom that border people paid a "black rent" or "black mail" in the East March. In February, Drury wrote to Cecil that Mary, Queen of Scots, captive at Lochleven, was "troubled with a disease in her side and a pain in her arm".

In March, Drury reported that English silver coins were acquired with base metal Scottish coins (such as placks and bawbees) and recoined at a profit at the Scottish mint. Drury wrote to Cecil on 3 April 1568 regarding Mary's attempted escape from Lochleven Castle on 25 March, disguised as a laundry woman. Mary finally escaped on 2 May, and after a defeat at the battle of Langside made her way to England.

Drury heard that trouble on the borders was caused by Dan Carr or Ker of Shilstoke-Bray, who was said to have visited Mary, Queen of Scots, at Carlisle Castle. She was supposed to have encouraged him to make trouble in Teviotdale, Liddesdale, and the West borders, and to spread seditious literature to make difficulties for Regent Moray. Lord Hunsdon set men to watch for him, Dan Carr was eventually captured by Walter Ker of Cessford.

Drury went to Scotland with Sir Henry Gates and met Regent Moray in the Great Hall of Stirling Castle on 19 January 1570, and they had a discussion in his bedchamber after dinner. Moray was proceeding to keep an appointment with Drury in Linlithgow when he was mortally wounded, and it was probably intended that Drury should be murdered also.

After this event, Drury led two raids into Scotland against the supporters of Mary, Queen of Scots. In May 1570, he commanded a force of over 1000 soldiers and marched on Glasgow Castle, and Hamilton and Craignethan. He came under fire at Dumbarton Castle. Three times he went to Scotland on more peaceable errands, during which, however, his life was continually in danger from assassins. As ambassador with Thomas Randolph in April 1572, during the Marian Civil War, he stayed at Restalrig Deanery. There he plotted with Archibald Douglas to kidnap George, Lord Seton from the shore at Leith, but the plan did not take effect.

In May 1573, he commanded the force which compelled Edinburgh Castle to surrender. During the 1573 "lang siege", Drury billeted at the house of Robert Gourlay on the Royal Mile, a few hundred metres from the castle. When the castle fell, the coffer containing Mary's jewels and the crown jewels or Honours of Scotland were found in a chest in a "cave" or cellar. Drury and the English taskforce withdrew to Leith.

Regent Morton had argued with Drury, and in June he wrote to Margaret Douglas, Countess of Lennox, asking if she could use her influence to have him sacked from his office at Berwick.

=== Drury and Mary's jewels ===
It was suspected that William Kirkcaldy of Grange, the defeated and executed commander of the Edinburgh Castle, had secret dealings with Drury. After the siege Drury obtained some of the royal jewels for a time. Regent Morton had to pay to redeem these as they were pledges for loans. He wrote again to Margaret Douglas asking her to be a "furtherer" of his travails recovering these jewels on behalf of James VI.

Grange seems to have intended to give some pieces of turquoise jewellery to Drury's wife Lady Thame as a kind of diplomatic gift at Restalrig in 1572. Grange denied the gift had been made and disputed marginal notes made in an inventory (which survives). A year after the Castle fell, a letter came to light, which mentioned the jewels Mary, Queen of Scots, had left behind in Scotland, and that Drury had taken some for a loan of £600.

=== Ireland ===
In 1576, he was sent to Ireland as President of Munster, where his rule was severe but effective, and in 1578 he became Lord Justice of Ireland, taking the chief control of affairs after the departure of Sir Henry Sidney.

After they were betrayed to Drury by the Rebel Earl of Desmond after being secretly smuggled back into Ireland from France and put ashore at Corca Dhuibhne, Irish Catholic Martyrs Bishop Patrick O'Hely and Friar Conn O'Rourke were brought before Drury for interrogation. Both Franciscans insisted that they were not involved in anything except their religious mission, and refused to take the Oath of Supremacy or answer questions about alleged plans by the Pope and King Philip II of Spain for invading the British Isles. In response, Drury ordered them both delivered to torture.

According to Cardinal Patrick Francis Moran, "These orders from Drury were executed with an uncommon degree of barbarity. The two prisoners were first placed on the rack, their arms and feet were beaten with hammers, so that their thigh bones were broken and sharp iron points and needles were cruelly thrust under their nails, which caused an extreme agony of suffering. For a considerable time they were subjected to these tortures, which the holy confessors bore patiently for the love of Christ, mutually exhorting one another to constancy and perseverance."

At long last, both Franciscans were taken from the rack and hanged under orders from Drury from a tree outside one of the gates in the walls of Kilmallock on 13 August 1579. Their bodies were then left suspended for fourteen days, during which both bodies were used for target practice by Kilmallock military garrison of the Tudor Army.

According to Cardinal Patrick Francis Moran, "When the martyr-prelate was being hurried to execution, he turned to Drury, and warned him that before many days he himself should appear before the tribunal of God to answer for his crimes. On the fourteenth day (sic) after, this unhappy man expired in great agony, at Waterford, of a distemper that baffled every remedy." The Second Desmond Rebellion had just broken out when Sir William Drury died in October 1579.

== Marriage and issue ==
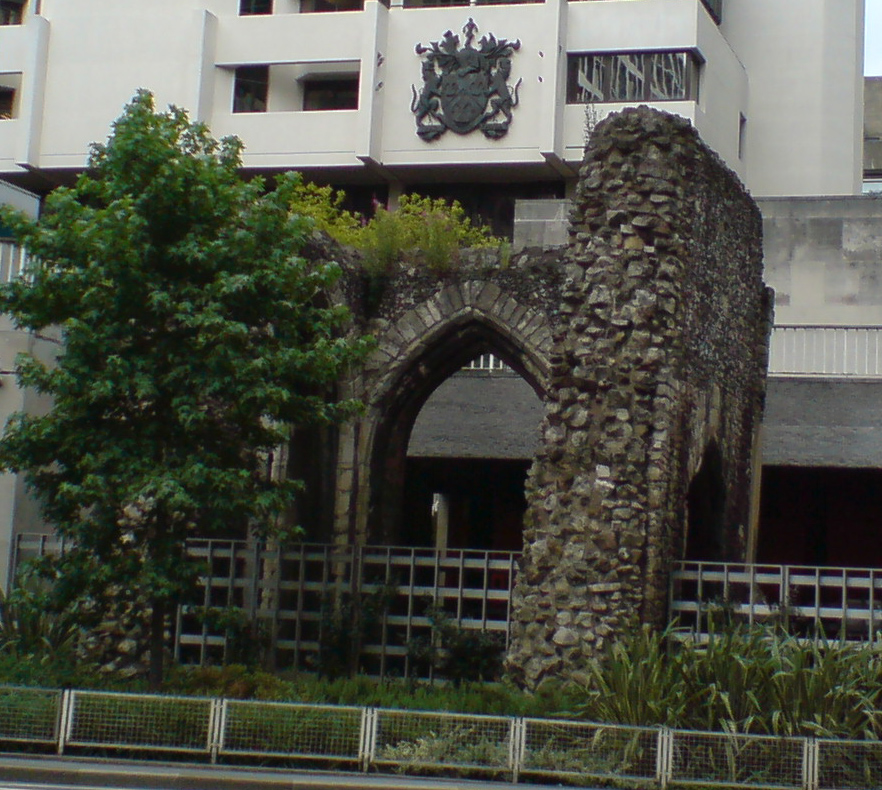
Ruins of St Alphage London Wall, where Sir William Drury and Margaret Wentworth were married

On 10 October 1560 at St Alphage London Wall Drury married Margery Wentworth (died 1587), widow of John Williams, 1st Baron Williams of Thame, and daughter of Thomas Wentworth, 1st Baron Wentworth of Nettlestead, Suffolk, by whom he had three daughters:

- Jane Drury, who married Sir Richard Chetwood, son of Richard Chetwood and Agnes Wodehull.
- Anne Drury, who married Robert Hartwell, esquire.
- Elizabeth Drury, who was born 12 December and baptised 29 December 1573 at Long Crendon, Buckinghamshire, with Queen Elizabeth I, Lady Wentworth, and Robert Dudley, 1st Earl of Leicester, as godparents.

== Legacy ==
After Drury's death, his widow married, in 1580, James Croft (died 4 September 1624), the third son of Sir James Croft of Croft Castle, Herefordshire. Croft had served as a captain under Margaret's second husband, Sir William Drury, in 1578–9. The couple settled on property in Weston-on-the-Green, Oxfordshire, which had come to Margaret through her first marriage.

Drury's letters to Cecil, and others, are invaluable for the story of the relations between England and Scotland at this time.

His house in London later gave its name to Drury Lane.

After painstaking investigation by the Catholic Church in Ireland, both Patrick O'Hely and Conn O'Rourke were beatified by Pope John Paul II in September 1992.
