= Sheriff of Bedfordshire and Buckinghamshire =

Ceremonial officer of Bedfordshire and Buckinghamshire, England

This is a list of Sheriffs of Bedfordshire and Buckinghamshire. One sheriff was appointed for both counties from 1125 until the end of 1575 (except for 1165–1166), after which separate sheriffs were appointed. See High Sheriff of Bedfordshire and High Sheriff of Buckinghamshire for dates before 1125 or after 1575.

== 1125–1199 ==
- before 1129: Richard of Winchester
- Michaelmas 1125–1129: Maenfinin Brito
- Michaelmas 1129: Richard Basset of Drayton Basset and Weldon with Aubrey de Vere
- 1139: Aubrey de Vere, of Castle Heningham and Bolbec Castle, Bucks, and Richard Basset
- 1155: Aubrey de Vere, of Castle Heningham and Bolbec Castle, Bucks, and Richard Basset
- Michaelmas 1155: Henry of Essex, Baon of Raleigh and John of Bidun
- Michaelmas 1156: Simon Fitz Peter
- Michaelmas 1159: Geoffrey Fitz Ralph and Richard Fitz Osbert
- Michaelmas 1160: Richard Fitz Osbert
- Michaelmas 1162: Hugh de la Lege
- Michaelmas 1165: Hugh de la Lege (Beds) and Richard Fitz Osbert (Bucks)
- Michaelmas 1166: Hugh de la Lege and Richard Fitz Osbert
- Michaelmas 1169: Hugh de la Lege and William, son of Richard Fitz Osbert
- Easter 1170: David, Archdeacon of Buckinghamshire, and William Fitz Richard
- Easter 1173: William Fitz Richard
- Easter 1179: William Rufus
- Easter 1187: Oger Fitz Oger
- Michaelmas 1189: William Rufus
- Easter 1194: Simon de Beauchamp, of Bedford Castle, Beds
- Michaelmas 1197: William de Albini
- Michaelmas 1199: Geoffrey Fitz Peter, 1st Earl of Essex

== 1200–1299 ==
- Michaelmas 1204: Robert of Braybrooke and Robert Fitz Hemeri
- Michaelmas 1205: Robert of Braybrooke
- Michaelmas 1211: Henry of Braybrooke
- 3 September 1214: Hugh Le Gournay
- 25 June 1215: Walter de Neville
- 2 July 1215: Ralph Hareng
- Michaelmas 1217: Falkes de Breauté
- 23 January 1224: Walter of Pattishall, of Bletsoe, Beds
- 5 September 1228: Sir Stephen de Segrave
- 30 May 1234: Ralph Fitz Reginald
- 22 October 1235: William de Beauchamp, of Bedford Castle, Beds
- 11 April 1237: Reginald de Whitchurch, of Whitchurch, Bucks
- 26 December 1237: Robert de Haya
- Christmas 1238: Sir John de Grey, of Waterhall in Bletchley, Bucks
- Michaelmas 1239: Paulin de Peyvre, of Toddington, Beds and Chilton, Bucks
- April 1241: Robert de la Haye and John le Deveneys, acting
- 24 October 1241: John Grimbaud
- 7 October 1242: William de Holwell, of Holwell, Beds
- 19 April 1249: Alexander de Hamden, of Great Hampden, Bucks
- 2 November 1252: Simon de Crendon or de Eltisden, of Long Crendon, Bucks
- 6 November 1255: Robert le Savage
- 19 October 1256: Walter de Tottenhall, of Tottenhall, Beds
- 21 October 1256: Robert de Tottenhall, of Tottenhall, Beds
- 23 October 1258: Simon of Pattishall
- Michaelmas 1259: Alexander de Hampden, of Great Hampden, Bucks
- 27 June 1264: Simon of Pattishall, of Bletsoe, Beds
- Michaelmas 1265: Geoffrey le Ros
- 11 October 1266: Edward Plantagenet, Lord of Chester
- Michaelmas 1272: Thomas de Bray, of Eaton Bray, Beds
- 14 October 1275: Hugh de Stapleford
- 25 October 1278: John Cheyne, of Chenies, Bucks
- 5 November 1282: Ralph de Golding, of Goldington, Beds
- 1 July 1285: Robert Malet, of Langley, Bucks
- 16 October 1285: William de Boyvile
- Easter 1288: William de Turvile, of Weston Turville, Bucks
- 20 November 1289: John de Pabenham, of Pabenham and Fleet Marston, Beds
- 16 January 1291: William de Turvile, of Weston Turville, Bucks
- 16 July 1293: Nicolas de Trimenel or de Turvile
- 19 July 1296: Simon de Bradenham, of Bradenham, Bucks
- 7 November 1297: Walter de Molesworth, of Bedfordshire

== 1300–1399 ==
- 9 October 1307: Gilbert de Holme
- 10 May 1308: Walter de Molesworth, of Bedfordshire
- 7 October 1309: William Mere
- 28 October 1312: Walter de Molesworth, of Bedfordshire
- 24 April 1313: John de Pabenham, of Pabenham and Fleet Marston, Bucks
- 1 November 1314: John de la Hay, of Shalstone, Bucks
- 20 May 1318: Roger de Tyringham, of Tyringham, Bucks
- 1 December 1318: Philip de Aylesbury, of Milton Keynes, Bucks
- 30 May 1319: Richard de Cave
- 28 April 1320 Ingelram de Berenger
- 20 August 1321: Philip de Aylesbury
- 3 June 1322: Ingelram de Berenger
- 5 April 1323: Ralph de Wedon
- 12 May 1323: Roger de Tyringham, of Tyringham, Bucks
- 1 May 1325: John de la Hay, of Shalstone or Hemel Hempstead
- 26 December 1325: Philip de Aylesbury
- 24 February 1327: Philip de Somerville
- 15 July 1328: John le Mareschal, of Chesham
- 5 December 1330: Philip de Aylesbury
- 8 May 1333: Ralph de Wedon, of Weedon, Bucks
- 28 October 1334: Richard Ward
- 24 March 1336: Ralph de Wedon
- 1 October 1337: William Moton
- 3 July 1338: Nicholas de Passelow, of Drayton Passelew
- 14 October 1340: John le Venour
- 6 January 1341: Gerard de Braybroke, of Colmworth, Beds and Horsenden, Bucks
- 22 December 1341: Henry de Chalfont, of Chalfont, Bucks
- 11 November 1342: John Aygnell
- 22 November 1343: Henry de Chalfont
- 4 November 1344: Thomas de Swynford, of Bedfordshire
- 12 November 1346: Sir William Crozier, of Bedfordshire
- 13 June 1349: Thomas Frembaud or Fermbrand, of Bedfordshire
- 2 November 1350: John Chastillon, of Thornton, Bucks
- 5 December 1352: Gerard de Braybroke, of Colmworth, Beds and Horsenden, Bucks
- 10 November 1354: Peter de Salford, of Salford, Beds
- 10 November 1356: Hugh Chastillon, of Thornton, Bucks
- 27 February 1357: John de Hampden, of Great Hampden, Bucks
- 1 October 1359: Peter de Salford
- 21 November 1360: John de Hampden, of Great Hampden, Bucks
- 23 November 1361: Peter de Salford
- 17 November 1365: Sir John Aylesbury, of Milton Keynes, Bucks
- 5 November 1371: John Cheyne, of Chenies
- 12 November 1372: John Ragon, of Bedfordshire
- 7 November 1373: Sir John Aylesbury, of Milton Keynes, Bucks
- 12 December 1374: John de Arderne, of Buckinghamshire
- 1 October 1375: John Broughton, of Broughton, Bucks
- 26 October 1376: John (FitzRichard) de Olney, of Weston Underwood, Bucks
- 26 November 1377: Sir John Aylesbury, of Milton Keynes, Bucks
- 25 November 1378: Thomas Peyver, of Toddington, Beds
- 5 November 1379: Sir Giles d'Aubeney
- 18 October 1380: John Bermyngeham
- 25 November 1380: Sir Thomas Sackville
- 1 November 1381: Sir John Aylesbury, of Milton Keynes, Bucks
- 1 November 1383: John Wodeville
- 11 November 1384: Robert Dixwell, of Tingrey, Beds
- 20 October 1385: Thomas Covell, of Buckinghamshire
- 18 November 1386: Sir John Aylesbury, of Milton Keynes, Bucks
- 18 November 1387: Ralph Fitz Richard, of Bedfordshire
- 1 December 1388: Thomas Peyver, of Toddington, Beds
- 15 November 1389: Sir Thomas Sackville
- 7 November 1390: Edmund Hampden, of Great Hampden, Bucks
- 21 October 1391: William Tyringham, of Tyringham, Bucks
- 18 October 1392: Thomas Peyver, of Toddington, Beds
- 7 November 1393: Philip Walwyn, of Bedfordshire
- 11 November 1394: John Longville, of Wolverton, Bucks
- 9 November 1395: Edmund Hampden, of Great Hampden, Bucks
- 1 December 1396: Reynold Ragon
- 3 November 1397: John Worship, of Hardwick, Bucks
- 31 October 1399: Thomas Eston, of Holme, Beds

== 1400–1499 ==
- 24 November 1400: Edmund Hampden, of Great Hampden, Bucks
- 8 November 1401: Sir Roger Beauchamp, of Eaton Socon, Beds
- 29 November 1402: Reynold Ragon,
- 5 November 1403: John Bois, of Chesham Bois, Bucks
- 22 October 1404: Richard Hasilden
- 22 November 1405: Edmund Hampden, of Great Hampden, Bucks
- 5 November 1406: Thomas Peyver, of Toddington, Beds
- 30 November 1407: Richard Hay, of Shalstone, Bucks
- 15 November 1408: Sir Baldwin Pigot, of Stratton and Biggleswade, Beds
- 4 November 1409: Thomas Strickland, of The Hoo, Beds
- 29 November 1410: Richard Wyot
- 10 December 1411: Sir Baldwin Pigot, of Stratton and Biggleswade, Beds
- 3 November 1412: Sir Thomas Aylesbury, of Milton Keynes, Bucks
- 6 November 1413: Thomas Strickland, of The Hood, Beds
- 12 November 1414: Edmund Hampden, of Great Hampden, Bucks
- 1 December 1415: Thomas Walton
- 30 November 1416: Richard Wyot
- 10 November 1417: John Giffard, of Whaddon, Bucks
- 4 November 1418: Walter Massey
- 23 November 1419: Walter Fitz Richard, of Bedfordshire
- 16 November 1420: John Radwell
- 1 May 1422: William Massey
- Michaelmas 1422: Sir Thomas Walton
- 13 November 1423: Sir John Cheyne, of Chenies, Bucks or Drayton Beauchamp
- 6 November 1424: Richard Wyot
- 15 January 1426: John Cheyne, of Isenhampstead Chenies, Bucks
- 12 December 1426: William Massey
- 7 November 1427: Humphrey Stafford, of Milton Keynes, Bucks
- 4 November 1428: Sir Thomas Walton,
- 10 February 1430: Thomas Hoo, of Luton Hoo, Beds
- 5 November 1430: John Cheyne, of Isenhampstead Chenies, Bucks
- 26 November 1431: Sir Giles Daubeney
- 5 November 1432: Sir Thomas Walton
- 5 November 1433: James Gascoigne
- 3 July 1434: John Glove or Thomas Grove, of Grove
- 3 November 1434: John Hampden, of Great Hampden, Bucks
- 7 November 1435: John Broughton, of Broughton, Bucks
- 8 November 1436: Robert Mansfield, of Taplow, Bucks
- 7 November 1437: Sir Humphrey Stafford, of Milton Keynes, Bucks
- 3 November 1438: John Hampden, of Great Hampden, Bucks
- 5 November 1439: Walter Strickland, of The Hoo, Beds
- 4 November 1440: John Brecknock, of Hardwick, Bucks
- 4 November 1441: Edmund Hampden, of Dunton, Bucks
- 6 November 1442: Edmund Rede, of Boarstall, Bucks
- 4 November 1443: Thomas Singleton, of Hartwell, Bucks
- 6 November 1444: John Wenlock, of Somerley in Luton Hoo, Beds
- 4 November 1445: Thomas Rokes, of Fawley, Bucks
- 4 November 1446: Thomas Gifford, of Twyford, Bucks
- 12 February 1448: George Longville, of Wolverton, Bucks
- 20 December 1449: William Gedney
- 3 December 1450: John Hampden, of Great Hampden, Bucks
- 8 November 1451: Robert Whitingham, of Salden, Bucks
- 8 November 1452: Robert Olney
- Michaelmas 1453: vacant
- 5 November 1454: Edmund Rede and John Pulter
- 24 November 1454: Thomas Singleton, of Hartwell, Bucks
- 11 December 1455: Sir Thomas Charleton
- 17 November 1456: John Hampden, of Great Hampden, Bucks
- 7 November 1457: John Maningham, of Bedfordshire
- 7 November 1458: John Heton, of Buckinghamshire
- 4 April 1460: John de Broughton, of Broughton, Bucks
- 18 November 1460: Edmund Rede, of Boarstall, Bucks
- 13 December 1461: Thomas Reynes, of Clifton Reynes, Bucks
- 5 November 1463: Peter House
- 5 November 1464: John de Broughton, the elder, of Broughton, Bucks
- 5 November 1465: Sir John Butler, of Edlesborough, Bucks
- 5 November 1466: Thomas Hampden, of Great Hampden, Bucks
- 5 November 1467: John Forster, of Hanslope, Bucks
- 5 November 1468: William Lucy, of Haversham, Bucks
- 5 November 1469: Robert Booth
- 6 November 1470: Robert Olney
- 11 April 1471: Reginald Grey, of Wrest, Beds
- 9 November 1471: John Langston, of Caversfield, Bucks
- 9 November 1472: Sir John Butler, of Edlesborough, Bucks
- 5 November 1473: John Bulstrode, of Hedgerley Bulstrode, Bucks
- 7 November 1474: Drew Brudenell, of Chalfont St Peter, Bucks
- 5 November 1475: Edmund Molyneux, of Drayton Beauchamp, Bucks
- 5 November 1476: John Rotherham, of Luton, Beds
- 5 November 1477: Thomas Rokes, of Fawley, Bucks
- 5 November 1478: Thomas Fowler,of Buckingham, Bucks
- 5 November 1479: Richard Enderby, of Stratton, Beds
- 5 November 1480: Sir John Verney, of Middle Claydon, Bucks
- 5 November 1481: Thomas Hampden, of Great Hampden, Bucks
- 5 November 1482: Hugh Brudenell (perhaps the same as Drugo?)
- 21 April 1483: Drugo or Drew Brudenell, of Chalfont St Peter, Bucks
- 6 November 1483: Thomas Fowler, of Buckingham, Bucks
- 5 November 1484: Sir John Donne, of Horsenden, Bucks
- 5 November 1485: George Ingleton, of Thornton, Bucks
- 5 November 1486: Thomas Rokes, of Fawley, Bucks
- 4 November 1487: Thomas Fowler, of Buckingham, Bucks
- 4 November 1488: John Rotherham, of Luton, Beds
- 5 November 1489: Richard Godfrey, of Bedford, Beds
- 5 November 1490: John Langston, snr, of Caversfield, Bucks
- 5 November 1491: Richard Restwold, of Hedsor, Bucks and the Vache
- 26 November 1492: Edmund Cockayne, of Cockayne Hatley, Beds
- 7 November 1493: Richard Godfrey, of Bedford, Beds
- 5 November 1494: William Rede, of Boarstall, Bucks
- 5 November 1495: Thomas Dayrel, of Lillingstone Dayrell, Bucks
- 5 November 1496: Thomas Langston, snr, of Caversfield, Bucks
- 5 November 1497: John Gyfford, of Twyford, Bucks
- 5 November 1498: David Phelip, of Chenies, Bucks
- 11 November 1499: Richard Restwold, of Hedsor, Bucks

== 1500–1574 ==
- 15 November 1500: Sir Hugh Conway, of Waddesdon, Bucks
- 5 November 1501: Sir John St. John, of Bletsoe, Beds
- 8 November 1502: Richard Blount
- 18 November 1503: Edmund Bulstrode, of Hedgerley Bulstrode, Bucks
- 5 November 1504: Thomas Dayrell, of Lillingstone Dayrell, Bucks
- 1 December 1505: John Cheyne, of Chesham Bois, Beds
- 27 November 1506: William Gascoigne, of Cardington, Beds (1st term)
- 3 December 1507: Sir John Longuevile, of Wolverton, Bucks
- 15 December 1508: George Harvey, of Thurleigh, Beds
- 14 November 1509: John Mordaunt of Turvey, Beds
- 9 November 1510: John Dyve of Bromham, Beds
- 8 November 1511: Ralph Verney, of Middle Claydon, Bucks (1st term)
- 7 November 1512: Thomas Dynham, of Eythrope, Bucks
- 9 November 1513: William Gascoigne, of Cardington, Beds (2nd term)
- 7 November 1514: Sir Edward Bray, of Eaton Bray, Beds
- 5 November 1515: Sir John St John, of Bletsoe, Beds
- 10 November 1516: Sir George Harvey, of Thurleigh, Beds
- 9 November 1517: William Gascoigne, of Cardington, Beds (3rd term)
- 8 November 1518: Michael Fisher, of Clifton, Beds
- 13 February 1520: Sir William Rede
- 1521?: John Cheyne, of Chesham Bois, Bucks
- 3 February 1522: Sir Robert Lee, of Quarendon, Bucks
- 12 November 1522: Robert Dormer, of Buckinghamshire
- 13 November 1523: Thomas Langston, of Cavesfield, Bucks
- 10 November 1524: Sir Ralph Verney, jnr, of Middle Claydon, Bucks (2nd term)
- 6 May 1525: Michael Fisher
- 27 January 1526: Thomas Rotheram, of Luton, Beds
- 7 November 1526: Sir Edward Grevile
- 16 November 1527: Francis Pygot, of Stratton and Biggleswade, Beds
- 7 November 1528: Sir John Hampden, of Great Hampden, Bucks
- 9 November 1529: Sir John St John, of Bletsoe, Beds
- 11 November 1530: Sir Michael Fisher, of Clifton, Beds
- 9 November 1531: Robert Dormer, of Buckinghamshire
- 20 November 1532: Sir Edward Donne, of Horsenden, Bucks
- 17 November 1533: Sir Robert Lee, of Quarendon, Bucks
- 14 November 1534: Sir John St John, of Bletsoe, Beds
- 22 November 1535: Roger Corbet, of Linslade, Bucks
- 27 November 1536: Thomas Longueville, of Wolverton, Bucks
- 14 November 1537: Sir William Windsor, of Bradenham, Bucks
- 15 November 1538: Sir Robert Dormer, of Ascot, Bucks
- 17 November 1539: Sir Thomas Rotheram, of Luton, Beds
- 17 November 1540: Sir Ralph Verney, of Middle Claydon, Bucks (3rd term)
- 27 November 1541: Sir John Gostwick, of Willington, Beds
- 22 November 1542: John Gascoigne
- 23 November 1543: Thomas Gifford, of Twyford, Beds
- 16 November 1544: Sir Michael Fisher, of Clifton, Beds
- 22 November 1545: Lewis Dyve, of Bromham, Beds
- 23 November 1546: Sir Robert Drury, of Hedgerley, Bucks
- 27 November 1547: Sir Francis Russell, of Chenies, Bucks
- 3 December 1548: Francis Pygot, of Stratton and Biggleswade, Beds
- 12 November 1549: Sir John St John, of Bletsoe, Beds
- 11 November 1550: Sir Thomas Rotheram, of Luton, Beds
- 11 November 1551: Oliver St John, of Bletsoe, Beds
- 10 November 1552: Thomas Pigott, of Stratton and Biggleswade, Beds
- 8 November 1553: Sir William Dormer, of Wing Park, Bucks
- 14 November 1554: Arthur Longueville, of Wolverton, Bucks
- 14 November 1555: Sir Robert Drury, of Hedgerley, Bucks
- 13 November 1556: Sir Robert Peckham, of Bitlesden, Bucks
- 16 November 1557: Thomas Pigott, of Stratton and Biggleswade, Beds
- 23 November 1558: Sir Humphrey Ratcliffe, of Elstow Nunnery, Beds
- 9 November 1559: William Hawtrey, of Chequers in Ellisborough, Bucks
- 12 November 1560: Thomas Tyringham, of Tyringham, Bucks
- 8 November 1561: Sir Robert Drury, of Hedgerley, Bucks
- 19 November 1562: John Goodwyn, of Upper Winchendon, Bucks
- 8 November 1563: Paul Dayrell, of Lillingstone Dayrell, Bucks
- 9 November 1564: Thomas Fleetwode, of the Vache, Bucks
- 16 November 1565: Sir Henry Cheney, of Toddington, Beds
- 18 November 1566: John Cheney, of Chesham Bois, Bucks
- 18 November 1567: John Borlase, of Bockmere in Marlow, Bucks
- 18 November 1568: Sir William Dormer, of Wing Park, Bucks (second term; see 1553)
- 12 November 1569: Sir Edmund Ashfield, of Tattenhoe, Bucks
- 13 November 1570: Sir Lewis Mordaunt, of Turvey, Beds
- Michaelmas 1571: Thomas Pigott, of Stratton and Biggleswade, Beds
- 14 November 1571: Thomas Leigh
- 13 November 1572: Lewis Dyve, of Bromham, Beds
- 10 November 1573: Sir George Peckham, of Bitlesden, Bucks
- 15 November 1574: Ralph Astry, of Wood-End in Harlington, Beds

== See also ==
- High Sheriff of Bedfordshire
- High Sheriff of Buckinghamshire

== Bibliography ==
- Hughes, A. (1898). List of Sheriffs for England and Wales from the Earliest Times to A.D. 1831. London: Eyre & Spottiswoode. (with amendments of 1963, Public Record Office)
- Willis, Browne (1755). The History and Antiquities of the Town, Hundred and Deanry of Buckingham. London.
