= Sir Giles Daubeney =

Arms of Daubeney: Gules, four fusils conjoined in fess argent

Sir Giles Daubeney (1395–1446) of Barrington Court and South Petherton, in Somerset, was a Knight of the Shire, Sheriff and High Sheriff. His monumental brass effigy survives in South Petherton Church.

== Biography ==
Daubeney was born in 1395 at Kempston in Bedfordshire, where he was baptised on 25 October. He was the second son of Sir Giles Daubeney by his wife Margaret Beauchamp, a daughter of Sir John Beauchamp (1349–1408). His older brother, John Daubeney, died in 1409. Between 1418 and 1421 Daubeney served in the French wars. He was a Knight of the Shire for Somerset in 1425 and 1429; served as Sheriff of Somerset and Dorset from January to December 1426; and as Sheriff of Bedfordshire and Buckinghamshire, 1431–2.

Daubeney married three times. His first wife was Joan Darcy, the third daughter of Philip Darcy, Baron Darcy de Knayth of Lincolnshire, who predeceased her husband. Their eldest son and heir was William Daubeney (1424–1460). After Joan's death, and before 18 May 1436, Daubeney married Mary Lake, the eldest daughter and co-heiress of Simon Lake of Cotham, Nottinghamshire. She died on 17 February 1443 and was buried in South Petherton Church. His third marriage was to a certain Alice who survived him and remarried. She died on 26 or 27 March 1455.

Daubeney died at Barrington on 11 January 1446, at the age of 50.

== Monument at South Petherton ==
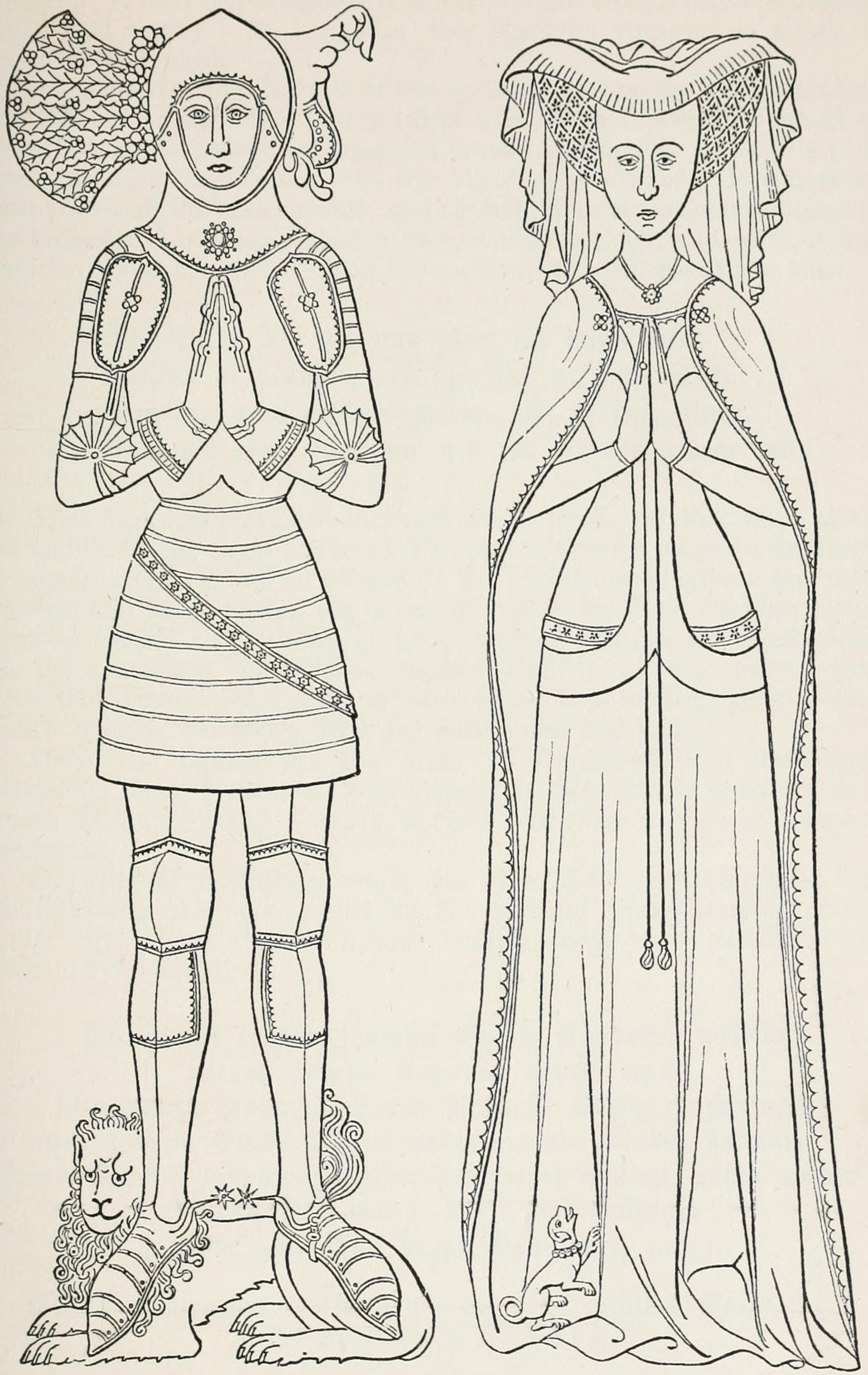
Drawing of monumental brasses of Sir Giles Daubeney and his first wife Joan Darcy, South Petherton Church, Somerset

The monumental brass effigies of Daubeney and his first wife Joan Darcy survive in the Church of St Peter and St Paul, in South Petherton, and include two inscribed plates and four heraldic shields. The effigy of Daubeney measures 123.8 centimetres (48.7 in) high; that of Joan measures 120.7 cm (47.5 in) high. The inscriptions are on two plates under the feet of the figures; the first measuring 40.6 cm (16.0 in) x 7 cm (2.8 in); the second measuring 54.3 cm (21.4 in) x 7 cm (2.8 in). Each heraldic shield is 12.7 cm (5.0 in) x 15.5 cm (6.1 in).

=== Heraldry ===
The four heraldic shields, three of which are heavily restored, display coats of arms and are located on either side of the figures, which latter are shown under Gothic arched canopies. The shields show the following quartered arms:

- 1: Daubeney: Gules, four fusils conjoined in fess argent. (pictured top within this article)
- 2 and 3: Daubeney impaling quarterly, first and fourth quarters, Darcy: azure, three cinquefoils between six cross-crosslets argent; second and third quarters, Meinell: Azure, three bars gemel or a chief of the last.
- 4: Darcy (badly worn) quartering Meinell.

=== Inscription ===
The monument includes a verse epitaph in Latin, of the so-called Quisquis variety, (i.e. "Whoever...") consisting of four lines, two lines on each plate.

The rhyming inscription and a literal translation is as follows:

Sis testis Xpe, q(uo)d non jacet (hic) lapis iste
Corpus ut ornetur, sed spiritus (ut) memoretur
Quisquis eris, qui transieris, sta perlege plora
Sum q(uo)d eris, fueramq(ue) q(uo)d es, pro me p(re)cor ora

Translated literally line by line as:

"Be a witness, O Christ, that this stone does not lie here
To adorn the body, but that it might commemorate the soul.
Whoever thou art who will pass by, stand, read, weep:
I am what you will be, I was what you are. I beseech you, pray for me!"

An inscription of near-identical meaning, but dating from much earlier, was recorded as existing on the ledger-stone of a Bishop of Crediton (conjectured to have been that of Eadwulf).

== Ancestors ==
Ancestors of Sir Giles Daubeney

8. Sir Ralph Daubeney (b 1304/05).
4. Sir Giles Daubeney (d. 1386).
9. Alice (dau of William Montagu, 2nd Baron Montagu).
2. Sir Giles Daubeney (d. 1403).
10. Sir Henry de Wilington.
5. Alianore (d. 1400).
11. Isabel (dau of Sir John de Walesbreu).
1. Sir Giles Daubeney (d. 1446).
12.
6. Sir John Beauchamp.
13.
3. Margaret.
14.
7.
15.

== Notes ==
Political offices
| Preceded by John Cheyne | High Sheriff of Bedfordshire and Buckinghamshire; 1431–1432 | Succeeded by Sir Thomas Walton |
Peerage of England
| Preceded by Giles Daubeney | Baron Daubeney de jure 1409–1446 | Succeeded by William Daubeney |
