= Thomas Gardiner (MP for Mitchell) =

Of Maidenhead, Berks. and London (1525/26-85 or later)

Thomas Gardiner (c. 1526 – 1585/c. 1591) was an English academic and politician.

Gardiner had origins in Maidenhead, and was educated at Eton College and King's College, Cambridge, being admitted as a scholar in 1542 aged 16, matriculating in 1544, and graduating B.A. 1547, M.A. 1550. He was a Fellow of King's College 1545–55, Proctor 1553–54, and Public Orator 1554–57.

He was elected MP for Mitchell in the parliament of 1558. The History of Parliament comments that "Gardiner’s return to the Parliament of 1558 is not easy to explain. He had no personal ties with Mitchell, where his name was inserted on the indenture in a different hand."

He worked as a teller at the Exchequer 1560–1569. He refuted claims of misconduct at the Exchequer reported to William Cecil in 1564, but in 1569 an investigation found that he had defrauded the Queen of nearly £30,000. He lost the tellership, was ordered to repay the money and, failing to do so, was imprisoned in 1571 and 1585. He appealed to Winchester and Cecil for leniency, to no avail.

Venn states that Gardiner died in 1585, but an individual of this name worked as an escheator in the Duchy of Lancaster until resigning in May 1588, and made a will on 20 February 1588. The will was proved in 1591.

Parliament of England
Preceded by John Arundell; John Thomas	Member of Parliament for Mitchell; 1558–1559; With: John Arundell	Succeeded by Drue Drury; Robert Colshill
