= Thomas Farmer (MP) =

16th-century English politician

Thomas Farmer (ca. 1546–1621), of East Barsham, Norfolk, was an English politician.

He was a member of parliament (MP) for Norfolk in 1586.

Parliament of England
Preceded by Sir Drue Drury; Nathaniel Bacon	Member of Parliament for Norfolk; 1586–1587; With: William Gresham	Succeeded by Sir Henry Woodhouse; Christopher Heydon
