= Thomas Walton =

English politician (c.1370–1450)

Sir Thomas Walton (also Wauton or Waweton; c. 1370 – c. 1450) was an English MP and Speaker of the House of Commons.

He was born the son of John de Walton of Great Staughton, Huntingdonshire, who was a previous MP for Huntingdonshire.

Thomas first entered Parliament as MP for Huntingdonshire in January 1396 and was then re-elected in September 1396, October 1400, and September 1402. He may have sat for Bedfordshire in 1409 and 1411 (the returns for those years have been lost) but on 8 May 1413 he was recorded as MP for the county. On 3 Nov 1414 he was returned once again for his home constituency of Huntingdonshire.

He was appointed High Sheriff of Bedfordshire for 1415, and knighted in September 1418. On 18 Sep 1419 he was again elected to parliament for Bedfordshire and on 23 Nov 1420 and 24 Oct 1422 again elected for Huntingdonshire. In 1422 he served a second term as sheriff of Bedfordshire and was appointed chamberlain of North Wales. On 20 Mar 1424 he was once more elected for Bedfordshire and this time was elected Speaker of the House. He served a third and fourth term as sheriff of Bedfordshire in 1428 and 1432, serving in between in 1431 as Knight of the Shire for Bedfordshire for the last time. In 1448 he was pardoned from any obligations to hold future office and died soon afterwards.

He had married Alana Berry of Wales with whom he had two sons and two daughters.

Coat of arms of Thomas Walton
Escutcheon Argent a chevron between three annulets Sable.

Political offices
Preceded by Edmund Hampden	High Sheriff of Bedfordshire and Buckinghamshire; 1414–1415	Succeeded by Richard Wyot
Preceded by William Massey	High Sheriff of Bedfordshire and Buckinghamshire; 1422–1423	Succeeded by Sir John Cheyne
Preceded by Humphrey Stafford	High Sheriff of Bedfordshire and Buckinghamshire; 1428–1430	Succeeded by Thomas Hoo
Preceded by Sir Giles Daubeney	High Sheriff of Bedfordshire and Buckinghamshire; 1432–1433	Succeeded by James Gascoigne
Preceded by John Russell	Speaker of the House of Commons; 1424–1426	Succeeded by Richard Vernon
