= John Butler (died 1576) =

English politician

Sir John Butler (1511/14 – 1576), of Watton at Stone, Hertfordshire, was an English politician.

He was the eldest son of Sir Philip Butler.

He was appointed High Sheriff of Essex and Hertfordshire for 1532–33 and 1539–40 and elected a member (MP) of the parliament of England for Hertfordshire in October 1553.
