= Richard Empson =

English politician (died 1510)

Sir Richard Empson
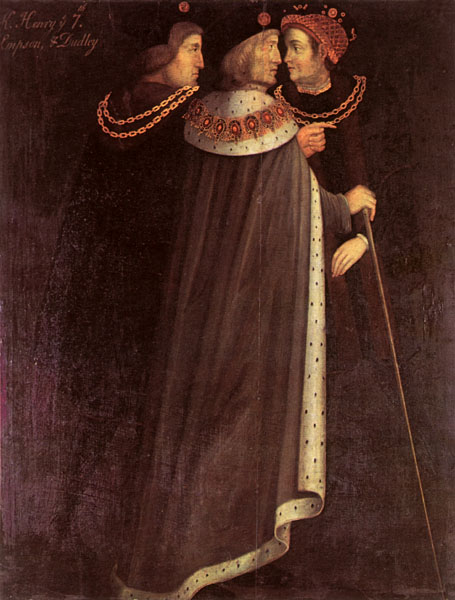
- Sir Richard Empson (left), with Henry VII and Sir Edmund Dudley.
- Born: c. 1450
- Died: 17 August 1510 (aged 59–60); Tower Hill
- Buried: Whitefriars, London
- Spouse: Lady Jane R. Empson
- Issue: Thomas Empson; John Empson; Elizabeth Empson; Joan Empson; Anne Empson; Mary Empson
- Father: Peter Empson
- Mother: Elizabeth Joseph

Sir Richard Empson (c. 1450 – 17 August 1510), minister of Henry VII, was a son of Peter Empson. Educated as a lawyer, he soon attained considerable success in his profession, and in 1491 was a Knight of the shire for Northamptonshire in Parliament, and Speaker of the House of Commons.

== Career ==
Richard Empson, born about 1450, was the son of Peter Empson (d. 1473) and Elizabeth (Joseph) Empson. John Stow claimed that his father was a sieve maker, but there is no evidence of this. His father, Peter Empson, held property at Towcester and Easton Neston in Northamptonshire.

Early in the reign of Henry VII he became associated with Edmund Dudley in carrying out the King's rigorous and arbitrary system of taxation, and in consequence he became very unpopular. Retaining the royal favour, however, he was knighted at the creation of the future Henry VIII as Prince of Wales on 18 February 1504, and was soon High Steward of the University of Cambridge, and Chancellor of the Duchy of Lancaster. From around 1504, Empson became a key figure of the Council Learned in the Law, a tribunal established around 1495 that operated outside the normal common law courts to maximize royal revenues through the aggressive collection of debts, bonds, and recognizances owed to the Crown. The Council's methods included using informants to prosecute breaches of penal statutes, imprisoning subjects to force financial settlements, and investigating feudal obligations, with Empson personally authorizing pardons, investigating concealed Crown lands, and managing forfeitures. According to contemporary accounts, Empson and Dudley collected over £200,000 for Henry VII in just four years, Their enforcement of the laws however made them very unpopular including the harshness in which they used said laws.

Thrown into prison by order of the new King, Henry VIII, he was charged, like Dudley, with the crime of constructive treason, and was convicted at Northampton in October 1509. His attainder by Parliament followed, and he was beheaded on 17 August 1510. In 1512, his elder son, Thomas, was "restored in blood", meaning that his father's attainder was reversed so far as it affected him, by Act of Parliament.

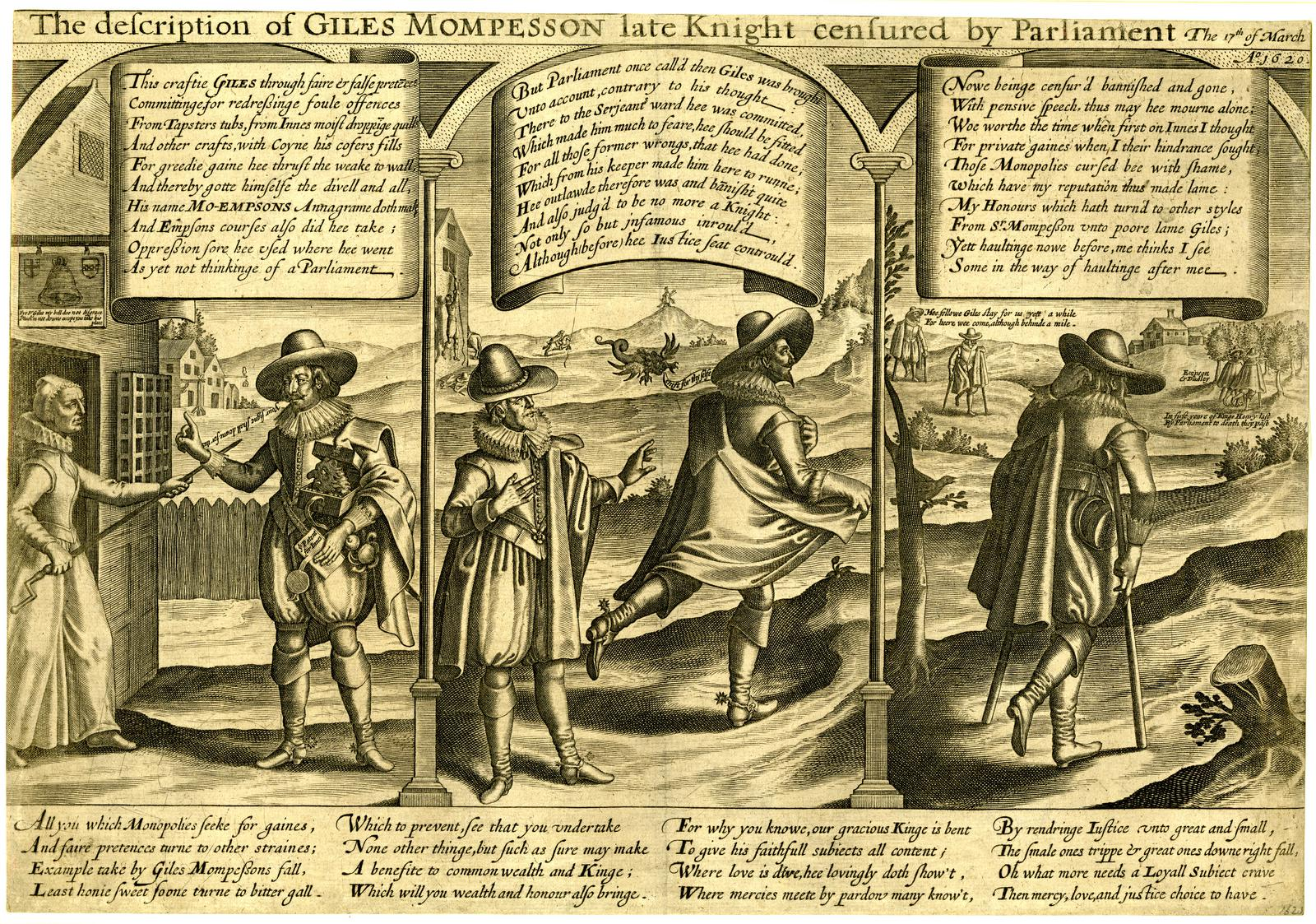

== Marriage and issue ==
Empson married Lady Jane R. Empson (née Hill) , by whom he had 10 children, including:

- Thomas Empson, eldest son and heir, who married Audrey or Etheldreda, one of the daughters of Sir Guy Wolston.
- John Empson, who married Agnes Lovell, daughter of Henry Lovell and Constance Hussey, and a ward of Edmund Dudley.
- Elizabeth Empson, who married firstly George Catesby, son of William Catesby, counsellor to Richard III, and secondly, in August 1509, Thomas Lucy, with grandson, Sir Thomas Lucy.
- Joan Empson, who married firstly Henry Sothill, esquire, of Stoke Faston, Leicestershire, Attorney General to Henry VII, by whom she had twin daughters, Joan Sothill (b. 1505), who married Sir John Constable (son of Sir Marmaduke Constable), and Elizabeth Sothill, (1505–1575) who married Sir William Drury, M.P., P.C., (c.1500–1558), a son of Sir Richard Empson's successor as Speaker of the House of Commons, Sir Robert Drury of Hawstead, Suffolk. She married secondly Sir William Pierrepont of Holme Pierrepont, Nottinghamshire.
- Anne Empson, who married firstly Robert Ingleton (d.1503), a ward of her father, by whom she had a daughter who married Humphrey Tyrrell. She married secondly John Higford, probably under duress, as in 1504 he was pardoned for her rape as well as burglary, and other offences.
- Mary Empson, who married Edward Bulstrode, son of Richard Bulstrode.

== Notes ==
Political offices
Preceded by Sir Thomas Fitzwilliam	Speaker of the House of Commons; 1491–1492	Succeeded by Sir Robert Drury
Preceded by Sir John Mordaunt	Chancellor of the Duchy of Lancaster; 1505–1509	Succeeded by Henry Marney
