= Simon Fitz Peter =

12th century English nobleman

Simon Fitz Peter was an English noble who during his career was sheriff of Northamptonshire, Bedfordshire and Buckinghamshire in the reign of Henry II, marshal in 1165, and justice-itinerant in Bedfordshire in 1163. The patronymic is sometimes rendered Fitz Piers.

== Life ==
Simon was the eldest son of Piers de Lutegareshale, forester of Ludgershall. His younger brother Geoffrey inherited by his wife Beatrice de Say the Earldom of Essex.

He was a steward of Simon II de Senlis, was sheriff of Bedfordshire and Buckinghamshire in Michaelmas 1156. Simon served as sheriff of Northamptonshire in 1155–1156 and 1163-1168. He is named in the witnesses of the Constitutions of Clarendon during January 1164.
