= Thomas de Strickland =

English soldier

Arms of family of Strickland of Sizergh

Sir Thomas de Strickland (also Stryckeland; 1367 – 30 July 1455) was an English soldier. He is best known for carrying the banner of St. George at the battle of Agincourt.

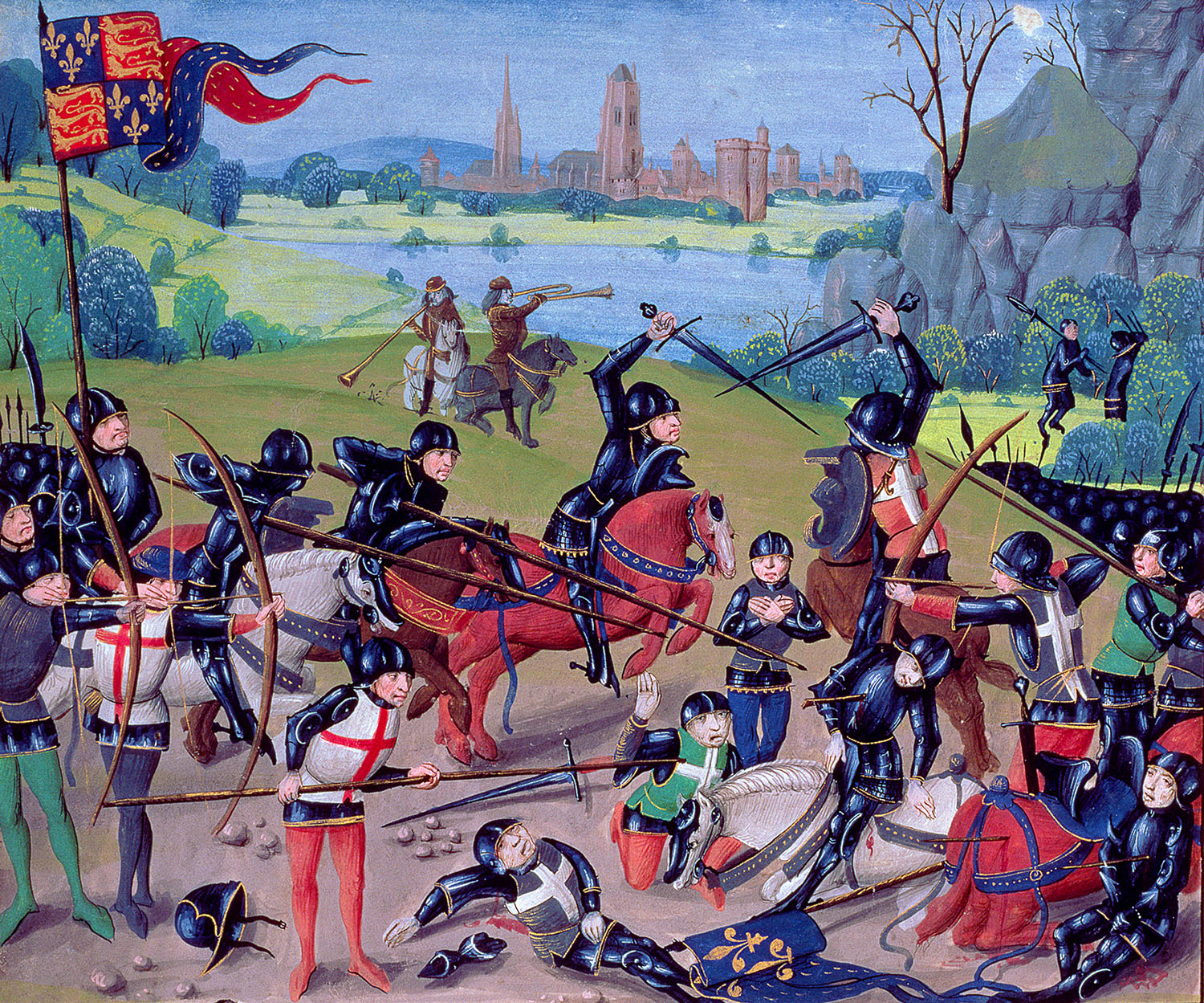
Battle of Agincourt

== At war ==
=== Biography ===
On 21 July 1403, de Strickland fought on the Royalist side at the Battle of Shrewsbury for Henry IV and was awarded by the King, a sum of £38 and two horses which had belonged to the rebel Henry Percy (Hotspur). He was also rewarded for his valiant efforts by being made Keeper of Inglewood royal forest in Cumberland.

He was appointed Sheriff of Bedfordshire and Buckinghamshire for 1410 and for 1414.

He was elected one of the knights of the shire (to represent Westmorland in the Parliament of England) in 1404, 1429, and 1431.

=== Battle of Agincourt ===
On 25 October 1415, de Strickland and his Men at arms, including a group of archers known as "the Kendal Bowmen", were part of the army of King Henry V which won a major battle at Agincourt in North West France against superior numbers. As de Strickland was a knight in training, or esquire, he fought dismounted with a sword, It was a question of honour that a man who carried the banner of St. George did so without the protection of a shield, as he would be protected by his men at arms.

== Family life ==
In 1405, de Strickland married Mabel de Beethom, daughter of Sir John de Bethom, and they had several children, including:

- Walter (1411-1466), married Douce Croft.
- Margaret
- Cecilia
- Robert

Strickland had been knighted by 1418, not long after the Battle of Agincourt. After that time it became common practice amongst noble families to drop the English "of" and the French "de" from their names, so Sir Thomas de (or of) Strickland became Sir Thomas Strickland.

== Later Stricklands ==
Thomas' son Walter Strickland (described in 1452 as an 'esquire') was an indentured retainer of Richard Neville, 5th Earl of Salisbury, and his 1452 indenture survives. He contracts to support the Earl of Salisbury with "bowmen horsed and harnessed, 69; billmen horsed and harnessed, 74; bowmen without horses, 71; billmen without horses, 76". (The term 'harnessed' refers to armour, not a horse harness.) During his father's lifetime he carried his father's banner of sable three escallops argent, but differenced by the overlay of a label of three points or.

Succeeding his father as Sir Walter, he is known to have fought for the Yorkists at 1st St Alban's in 1455 and Blore Heath in 1459. He married Douce Croft.

Sir Thomas Strickland was Walter's eldest son and he married Agnes Parr and later Margaret, widow of Sir John Byron. He also fought on the Yorkist side at Barnet (1471), where he was knighted by Edward IV, as well as fighting at Bosworth in 1485 for Richard III. He survived the battle and died in 1494.

== See also ==
- Strickland (surname)
- Sizergh Castle

=== Bibliography ===
Political offices
Preceded by Baldwin Pigot	High Sheriff of Bedfordshire and Buckinghamshire; 1409–1410	Succeeded by Richard Wyot
Preceded by Sir Thomas Aylesbury	High Sheriff of Bedfordshire and Buckinghamshire; 1413–1414	Succeeded by Edmund Hampden
