= John Gostwick =

16th-century English politician and courtier

Sir John Gostwick (c.1480 – 15 April 1545) was an English courtier, administrator and MP.

== Life ==
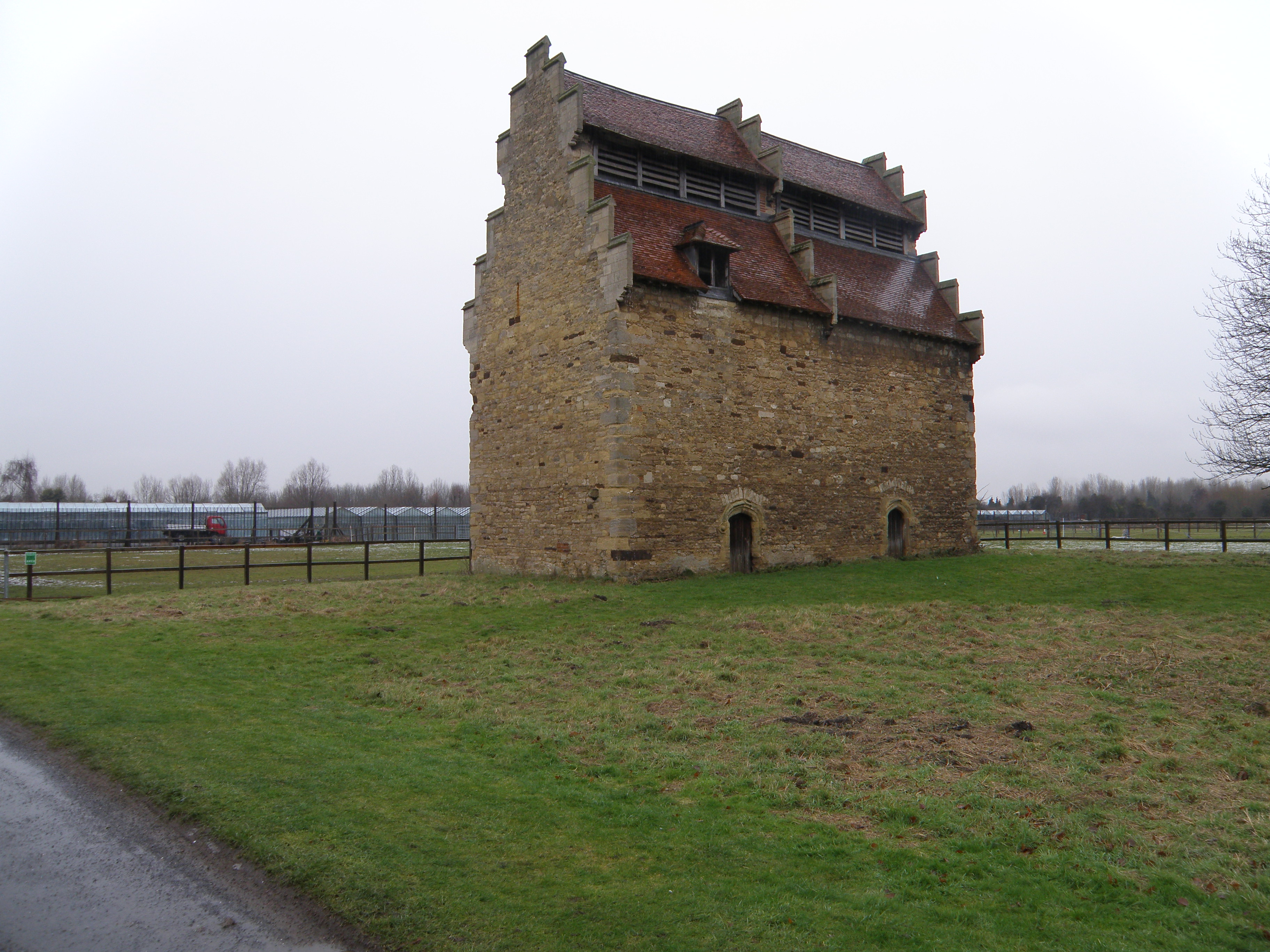
Dovecote at Willington Manor; it was constructed by Sir John Gostwick to house 1500 pigeons. Materials from Newnham Priory (dissolved 1535) may have been used.

He was born as the son of John Gostwick in Willington, Bedfordshire, and educated in Potton. Around 1510, he entered the service of Cardinal Wolsey and became a Gentleman Usher to Henry VII. He was also a merchant importing caps and hats from the continent of Europe. By 1517, he was a wax chandler. In 1523, he took on an auditorship at court, and pursued a career as a financial officer.

In 1529, Gostwick bought Willington Manor from Thomas Howard, 3rd Duke of Norfolk. He became a member of Gray's Inn and a JP (Justice of the Peace) for Bedfordshire. After Wolsey's death, he worked for his successor Thomas Cromwell in a number of important and lucrative roles, acting as a personal paymaster. During the Dissolution of the Monasteries, he acquired a considerable number of other properties and in 1538 was one of the judges who sentenced the Abbot of Woburn to be hanged for refusing to sign the Oath of Supremacy. He was knighted in 1540.

In 1539, Gostwick was elected a knight of the shire (MP) for Bedfordshire and in 1540 was appointed High Sheriff of Bedfordshire and Buckinghamshire. He was re-elected to represent Bedfordshire again in December 1544, but died before he could take his seat. At some point in his career as MP, he made a direct attack on Thomas Cranmer, as a Lutheran in his views on the sacrament. The incident was dated as in 1544 by John Foxe, but scholars now suspect it was earlier, at the time of the debates on the Six Articles.

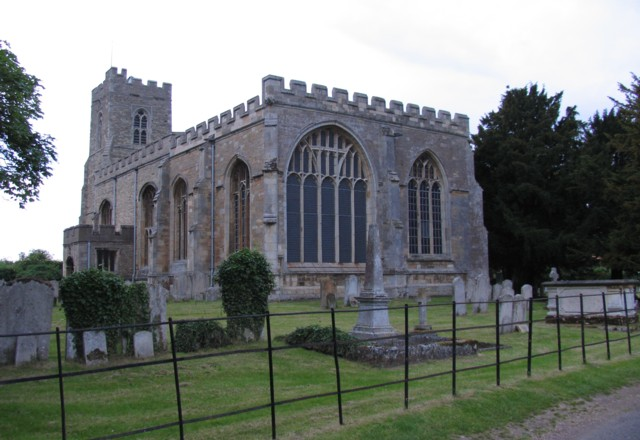
St Lawrence, Willington; the north chapel here (1541), and possibly the whole church, was constructed by Sir John Gostwick.

Gostwick died in 1545 and was buried in Willington church. He had married Joan and had a son William, who died shortly after his own death. The estates passed to his brother William.

== Bibliography ==
- Carter, P. R. N. "Gostwick, Sir John". Oxford Dictionary of National Biography (online ed.). Oxford University Press. doi:10.1093/ref:odnb/65949. (Subscription, Wikipedia Library access or UK public library membership required.)
- Bindoff, S.T., ed. (1982). "Gostwick, John (by 1493-1545) of Wakefield, Yorks and Willington, Beds". The History of Parliament: the House of Commons 1509-1558.

Political offices
| Preceded by Sir Ralph Verney | High Sheriff of Bedfordshire and Buckinghamshire; 1541–1542 | Succeeded by John Gascoigne |
