= George Peckham (merchant) =

English merchant venturer

- Born: Buckinghamshire, England
- Died: 1608
- Occupation: Merchant venturer
- Known for: High Sheriff of Bedfordshire and Buckinghamshire (1572)
- Spouse: Susan Webb (m. 1554; died 1555)
- Children: 2, Edmund the elder and George Peckham Jr (from second wife)
- Father: Sir Edmund Peckham

Sir George Peckham (died 1608) was an English merchant venturer who became the High Sheriff of Bedfordshire and Buckinghamshire.

== Life ==
He was the third son of Sir Edmund Peckham. George succeeded to the paternal estate at Denham, and was knighted in 1570.

In 1572, he was appointed High Sheriff of Bedfordshire and Buckinghamshire. In 1574 he, together with Sir Humphrey Gilbert, Sir Richard Grenville, and Christopher Carleill, petitioned the queen to allow them an expedition into unknown lands. In the enterprise, which finally took form in 1583, Peckham, alongside Thomas Gerard, was the chief adventurer, Gilbert assigning to him large grants of land and liberty of trade. In November 1583 he published A True Reporte. A major factor behind this plan was to allow Catholics to emigrate following the increase of fines imposed on those who failed to attend Anglican services in 1581.

Whether by unsuccessful ventures or otherwise, he afterwards became embarrassed in his circumstances, and in 1595 the estate and manor of Denham came to the queen by reason of his debt to the crown. They were conferred on William Bowyer.

Peckham died in 1608. He married, in 1554, Susan, daughter and heiress of Henry Webbe. She died in childbirth, at the age of seventeen, on 11 December 1555. By a second wife, two sons are mentioned: Edmund the elder, who would seem to have predeceased him; and George, who was his heir.

== Notes ==
Political offices
Preceded by Lewis Dyve	High Sheriff of Bedfordshire and Buckinghamshire; 1573–1574	Succeeded by Ralph Astry
