= John St John (Bedfordshire MP) =

16th-century English politician

- Arms of St John: Argent, on a chief gules two mullets or

High Sheriff of Bedfordshire and Buckinghamshire
- In office 1529-1530; 1534-1535; 1549-1550

Member of Parliament for Bedfordshire
- In office c. 1529? 1539; 1542

Personal details
- Born: By 1495
- Died: 19 December 1558
- Spouse(s): Margaret Waldegrave (m. 1521) Anne Neville
- Children: 14, including Oliver
- Relatives: John St John (grandson); Oliver St John (grandson)

Sir John St John (by 1495 – 19 December 1558), of Bletsoe, Bedfordshire, was an English politician.

== Biography ==
He was the son of Sir John St John of Bletsoe and his wife Sybil, daughter of Rhys ap Morgan. He succeeded his father in 1525 and was knighted the following year.

He was High Sheriff of Bedfordshire and Buckinghamshire for 1529–30, 1534–35, and 1549–50. He was a Member (MP) of the Parliament of England for Bedfordshire in 1529?, 1539 and 1542.

He first married, in 1521, Margaret, the daughter of Sir William Waldegrave of Smallbridge, Suffolk, with whom he had 5 sons (including John and Oliver) and 4 daughters and secondly Anne, the daughter of Thomas Neville of Cotterstock, Northamptonshire, with whom he had a further son and four daughters.
