= Robert Drury (speaker) =

English knight and politician (died 1536)

Sir Robert Drury
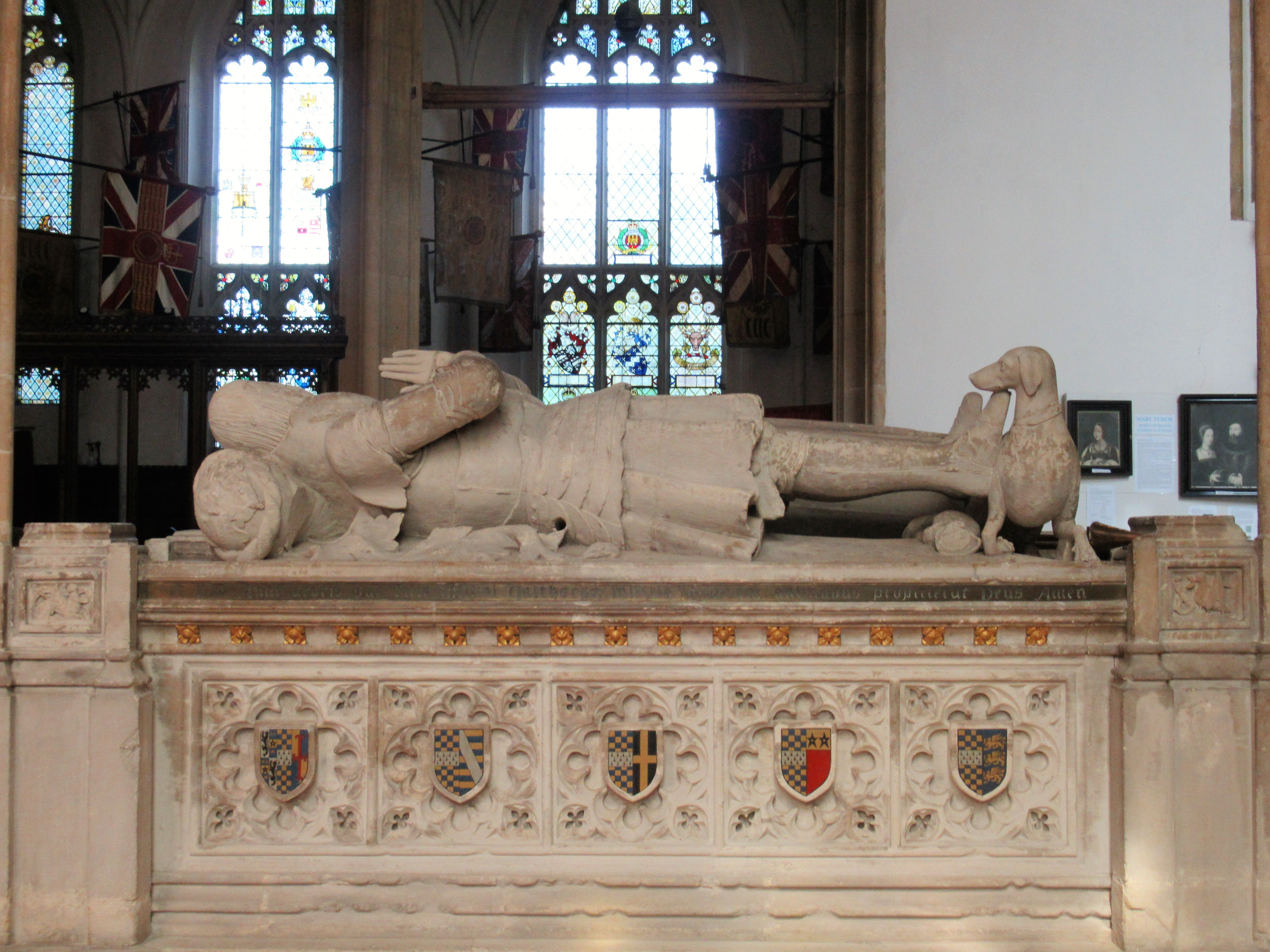
- Chest tomb with effigy of Sir Robert Drury; St Mary's Church, Bury St Edmunds
- Born: c. 1456; Hawstead, Suffolk
- Died: 2 March 1536
- Spouses: Anne Calthorpe; Anne Jerningham
- Children: Sir William Drury; Sir Robert Drury; Anne Drury; Elizabeth Drury; Bridget Drury; Ursula Drury
- Parent(s): Roger Drury, Felice Denston

Arms of Drury: Argent, on a chief vert a cross tau between two mullets pierced or, as seen on the chest tomb of Sir Robert Drury

Sir Robert Drury (c. 1456–1536) was an English knight, Lord of the manor of Hawstead, Suffolk, and Knight of the Body to Kings Henry VII and Henry VIII. As a politician he was Knight of the Shire for Suffolk, Speaker of the House of Commons (elected 4 October 1495), and Privy Councillor. He was also a barrister-at-law. His London townhouse was on the site of today's Drury Lane.

== Family ==
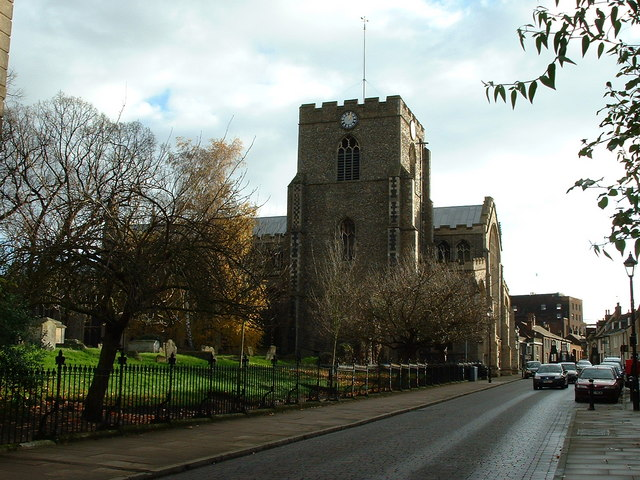
St. Mary's Church, Bury St Edmunds, Suffolk, burial place of Sir Robert Drury and his first wife

Robert Drury, born before 1456 at Hawstead, Suffolk, was the eldest of four sons of Roger Drury (d. 1496) of Hawstead, Suffolk, by his second wife Felice Denston, daughter and heiress of William Denston of Besthorpe, Norfolk.

== Career ==
With Sir Robert Drury began for this family a long connection with the courts of the Tudor sovereigns, and a succession of capable and eminent men whose careers are part of English history throughout the 16th century. In 1473 he was admitted to Lincoln's Inn, where he became a prominent figure. However, according to Hyde 'there is no evidence, as was once thought, that he was educated at Gonville Hall, Cambridge'.

Drury was named in many commissions in the county of Suffolk from 1486 onwards. Drury procured from Pope Alexander VI a licence for the chapel in his house at Hawstead, dated 8 July 1501 in the tenth year of that pontificate. The original is now in the museum at Bury. Another early reference to him is an indenture 15 December 1490 by which Robert Geddying, son and heir of John Geddyng, agreed with Robert Drury, esquire, for the erection of houses at Lackford, Suffolk, Roger and William Drury being co-feoffees.

He was elected Knight of the Shire (MP) for Suffolk in 1491, 1495 and 1510, acting as Speaker of the House in 1495.

Drury was knighted by King Henry VII on 17 June 1497, after the battle of Blackheath, and was present at the funeral of the young Prince Henry in 1511, where, amongst the list of mourners, he is included as one of the knights to bear the canopy. He was an executor of the will of John de Vere, 13th Earl of Oxford, who died in 1513.

Between June 1510 and February 1513 inclusive he was engaged with various colleagues in the attempt "to pacify the Scottish border by peaceful methods and to obtain redress for wrongs committed." Previously, on 29 August 1509, he had been a witness to the renewal of the "Treaty of Perpetual Peace" between England and Scotland, signed shortly after Henry VIII's accession to the throne.

In 1520 he sailed with other knights to France to attend the famous meeting between Henry VIII and Francis I of France now known as the Field of the Cloth of Gold.

== Legacy ==
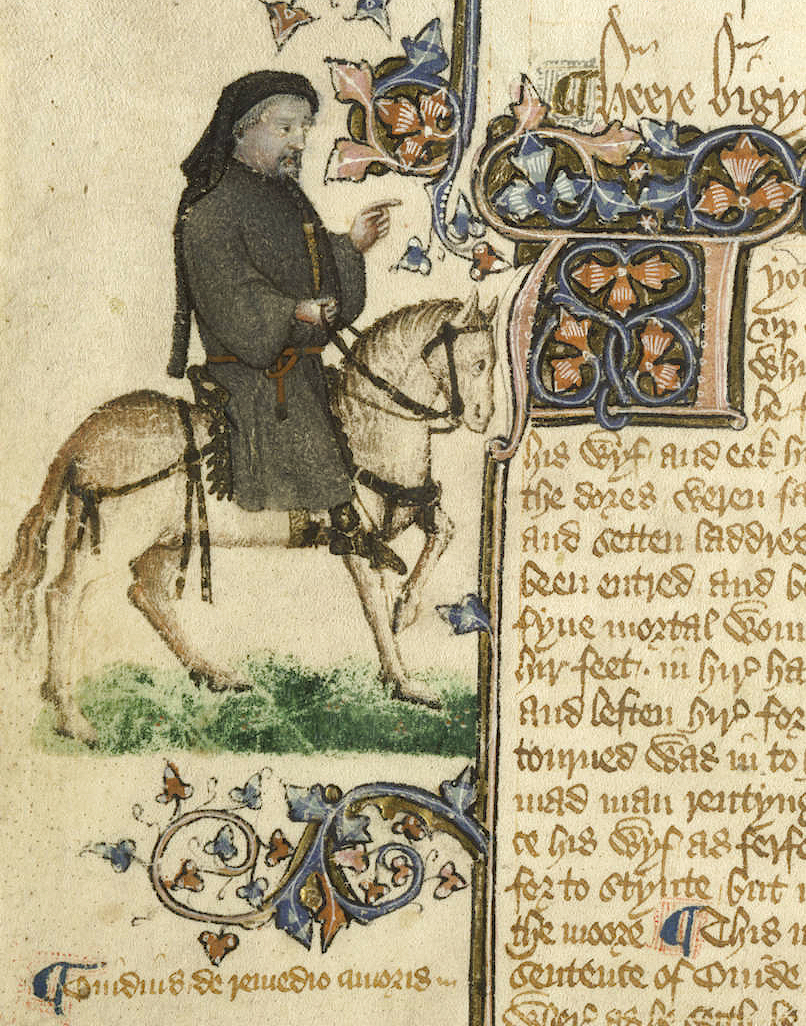
Detail showing Geoffrey Chaucer, in the Ellesmere manuscript of The Canterbury Tales, formerly in the library of Sir Robert Drury

Two splendid books once owned by Sir Robert Drury have survived. One, a fine Latin MS of the Vulgate, written by an English scribe early in the 13th century, is now in the library of Christ's College, Cambridge. Some blank leaves at the end have been used to record the marriages and progeny of his children. The first group of entries was made at the end of 1527; subsequent entries carry on the records of the growth of the family until 1566. The other book is the finest and most famous of all Chaucer MSS, the Ellesmere manuscript of The Canterbury Tales now in the Huntington Library. At the top of a preliminary fly-leaf is written "Robertus Drury, miles", and below a list of his children: "William Drury, miles, Robertus Drury, miles, Domina [Anne] Jarmin, Domina [Bridget] Jarningham, and Domina [Ursula] Allington."

On 1 May 1531 Drury made his last will, requesting burial in the chancel of St. Mary's Church, Bury St. Edmunds beside his first wife, Anne Calthorpe. He died 2 March 1535. Drury and Anne Calthorpe are buried under a stone monument in St. Mary's Church; a wooden palisade, no longer in situ*, once bore the inscription 'Such as ye be, sometime were we, such as we are, such shall ye be. Miserere nostri.' (*ref. visual inspection 21/6/2023)

Drury House, the mansion built by Robert Drury, eventually gave its name to London's Drury Lane and to the well-known Drury Lane Theatre.

== Marriages and issue ==
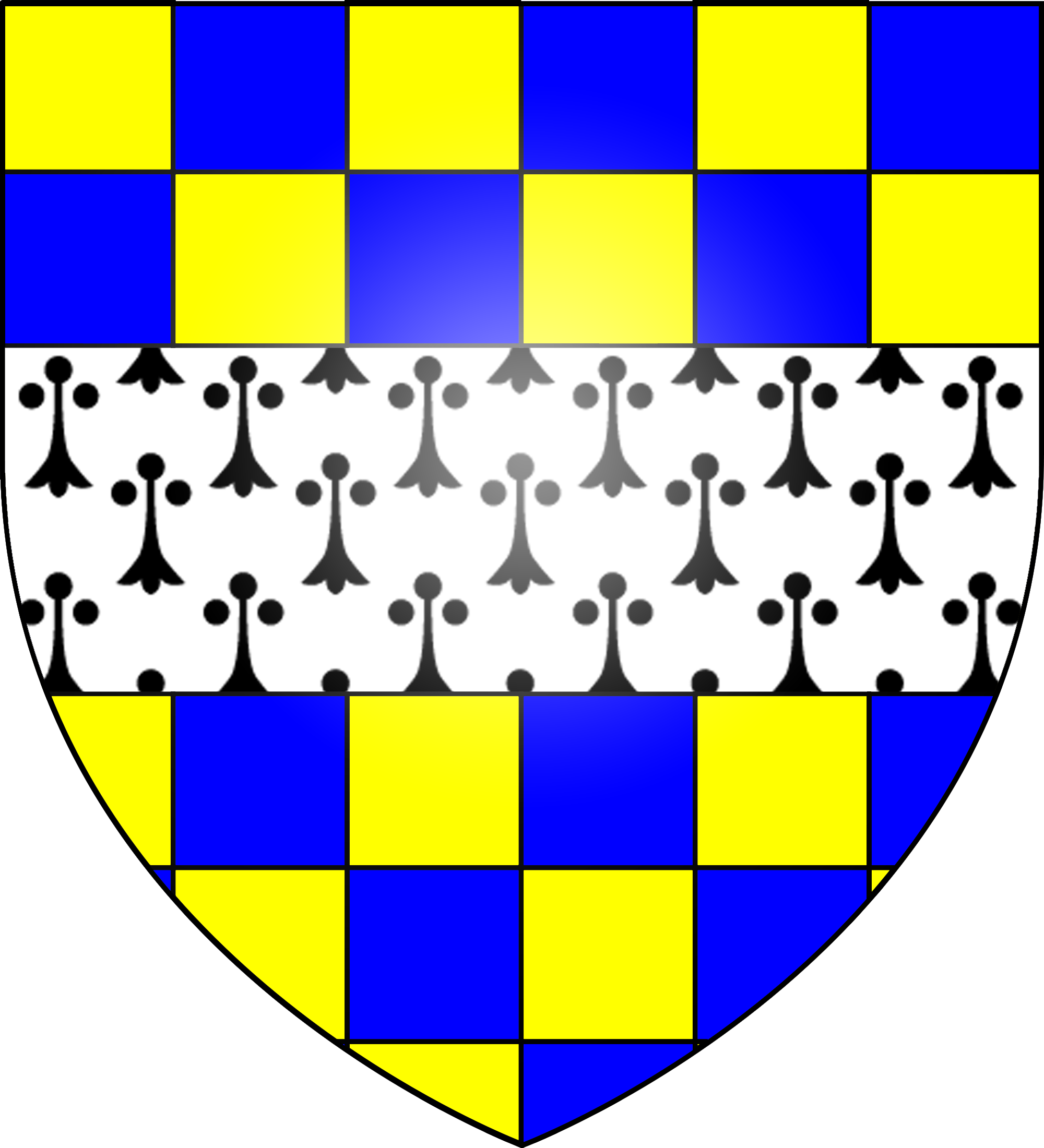
Arms of Calthorpe: Chequy or and azure, a fess ermine, as seen on the chest tomb of Sir Robert Drury

Drury married first, by 1494, Anne Calthorpe, daughter of Sir William Calthorpe of Burnham Thorpe, Norfolk, by whom he had two sons and four daughters:

- Sir William Drury (c. 1500–1558) of Hawstead, Suffolk, who married first, Jane Saint Maur (d. 1517), by whom he had no issue; and secondly, Elizabeth Sothill (1505–1575) a granddaughter of another Speaker of the House of Commons, and Chancellor of the Duchy of Lancaster, Sir Richard Empson (d. 17 August 1510).
- Sir Robert Drury.
- Anne Drury, who married first Sir George Waldegrave, esquire (c. 1483 – 8 July 1528) of Smallbridge, Suffolk, from whom descend the Earls Waldegrave, as well as a branch of the Highams of Higham Green and the Denham family; and secondly Sir Thomas Jermyn (c. 1500 – 1552) of Rushbrooke, Suffolk, from whom descend that family (including the Jacobite peer) as well as the Crane family of Chilton, later baronets.
- Elizabeth Drury, who married, in 1510, Sir Philip Boteler.
- Bridget Drury (d. 19 January 1518), who married Sir John Jerningham of Somerleyton, Suffolk, eldest son and heir of Edward Jerningham (d. 6 January 1515) of Somerleyton by his first wife, Margaret Bedingfield (d. 24 March 1504). By him she had three sons, George, Robert and John, and two daughters, Anne Jerningham, who married Sir Thomas Cornwallis of Brome, Suffolk, and Elizabeth Jerningham, who married John Sulyard of Wetherden, Suffolk.
- Ursula Drury, who married Sir Giles Alington of Horseheath, Cambridgeshire.

After Anne Calthorpe's death, Drury married secondly, Anne (née Jerningham), daughter of Sir Edward Jerningham (d. 6 January 1515) of Somerleyton, Suffolk, by Margaret Bedingfield (d. 24 March 1504), and sister of Sir John Jerningham (see above). At the time of her marriage to Sir Robert Drury, she is said to have been the widow of two husbands: Lord Edward Grey (d. before 1517), eldest son and heir of Thomas Grey, 1st Marquess of Dorset, and grandson of King Edward IV's wife, Elizabeth Woodville; and also of Henry Barley (d. 12 November 1529) of Albury, Hertfordshire. In his will Drury refers to her as 'my Lady Grey'. There was no issue of Drury's second marriage. After Drury's death, Anne (née Jerningham) married Sir Edmund Walsingham.

== Notes ==
Political offices
| Preceded by Sir Richard Empson | Speaker of the House of Commons; 1495 | Succeeded by Sir Thomas Englefield |
