= Philip Butler =

16th-century English politician

Philip Butler or Boteler (by 1493 – 6 June 1545), of Watton at Stone, Hertfordshire, was an English politician.

== Family ==
Butler was the eldest son of John Butler of Watton at Stone and his second wife Dorothy, a daughter of William Tyrrell of Gipping, Suffolk. The Butlers of Hertfordshire claimed descent from Ralph le Boteler, butler to Robert de Beaumont, Count of Meulan and Earl of Leicester in the time of Henry I, and by the 15th century they had been seated at Watton for some time.

Philip Butler married Elizabeth Drury in 1510, a daughter of Sir Robert Drury of Hawstead, Suffolk. They had twelve sons including Sir John Butler, and seven daughters.

== Career ==
He was a Member (MP) of the Parliament of England for Hertfordshire in 1529 and 1539.

Sir Philip was one of the Knights of the Body to King Henry VIII in 1516.

He was Sheriff of Hertfordshire in 1533 and 1540.

In 1530 he was one of the commissioners for Hertfordshire to inquire into the possessions of Wolsey.

In 1537 he was present at the christening of Prince Edward, who later became King Edward VI.

In 1539–40 he was among the knights appointed to meet Anne of Cleves, and was one of those who 'stood from the park pales upon the heath (Blackheath) to the meeting-place' (at Shooter's Hill).

In 1544 his name was enrolled as supplying men for the rearguard in the army against France, and later in the same year he was appointed to levy recruits.

== Lord of the Manor ==
At the dissolution of the monasteries King Henry VIII gave the manor of Aston, Hertfordshire for the tenth part of a Knight's fee, and a rent of seventeen shillings and eleven pence, to his local favourite, Sir Philip Boteler, Sheriff of Hertford. Sir Philip ruled at Woodhall in the contiguous parish of Watton. To establish himself on his new territory, he chose the site of a ruined building, probably of monastic origin and, using some of the structure and stone from the ruin, he built the manor house which we now know as Aston Bury.

He died on 6 June 1545 before his new manor house was completed. He was buried in Watton church where fragments of a brass on his tomb survive.
