= Hedgerley =

Village in Buckinghamshire, England

Coordinates: 51.576°N 0.602°W

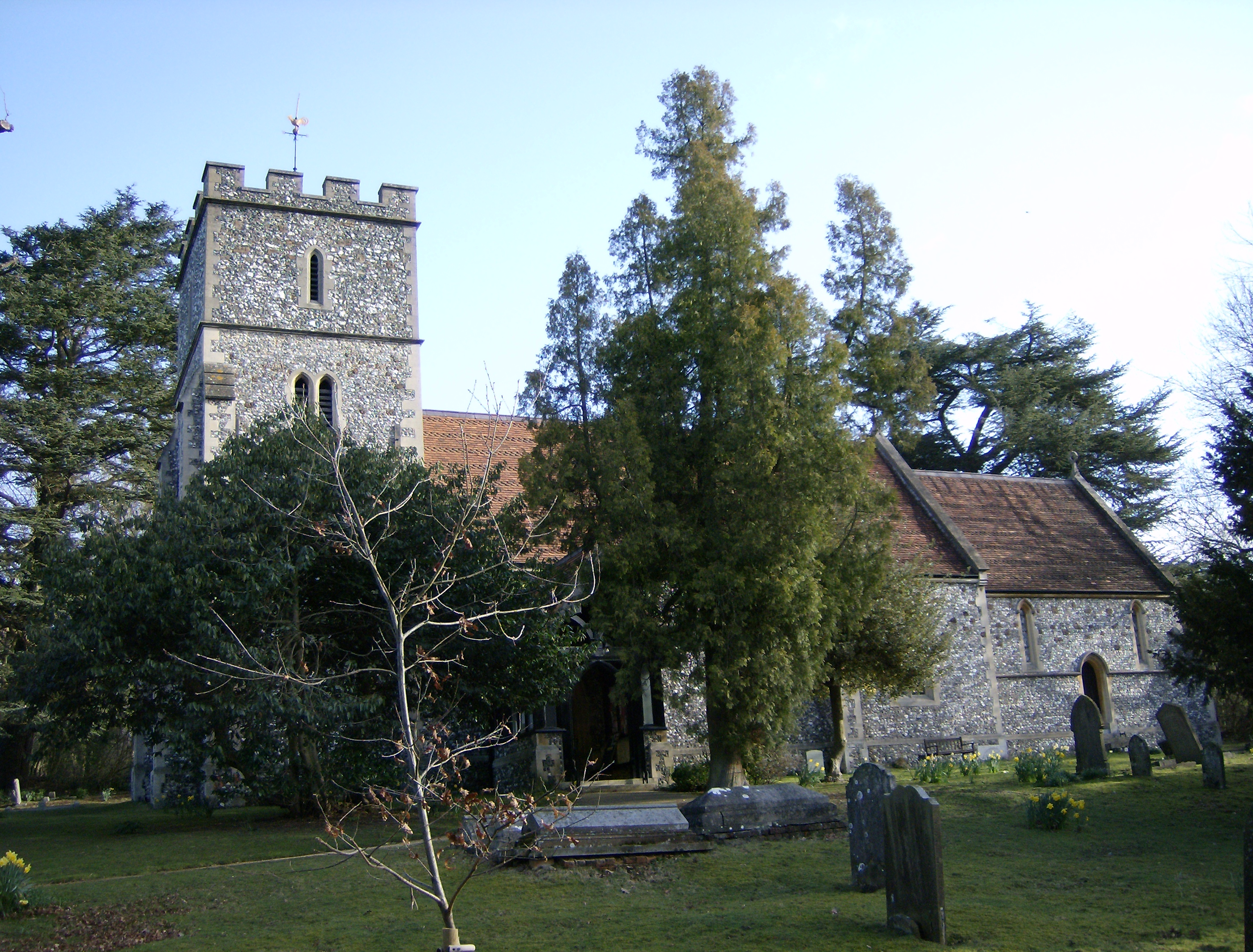
- Saint Mary the Virgin parish church

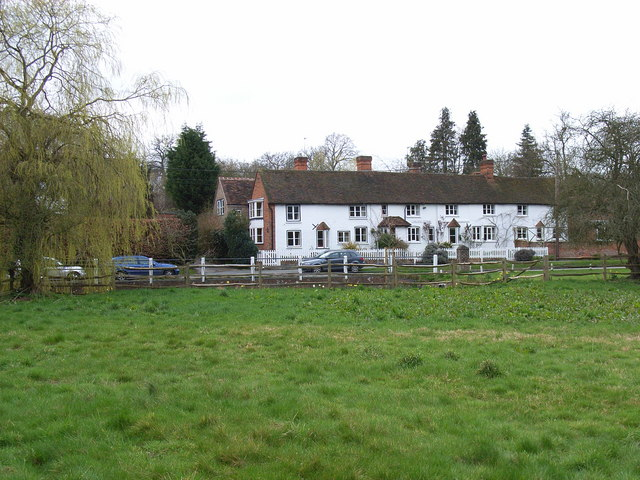
- Cottages in Hedgerley

- Location within Buckinghamshire
- Area: 6.8 km^{2} (2.6 sq mi)
- Population: 873 (2011 census including Jordans)
  - Density: 128/km^{2} (330/sq mi)
- OS grid reference: SU9687
- Civil parish: Hedgerley
- Unitary authority: Buckinghamshire
- Ceremonial county: Buckinghamshire
- Region: South East
- Country: England
- Sovereign state: United Kingdom
- Post town: Slough
- Postcode district: SL2
- Dialling code: 01753
- Police: Thames Valley
- Fire: Buckinghamshire
- Ambulance: South Central
- UK Parliament: Beaconsfield

Hedgerley is a village and civil parish in South Bucks district in Buckinghamshire, England. The parish is centred 3 miles (4.8 km) south-east of Beaconsfield and 2.5 miles (4.0 km) south-west of Gerrards Cross. The parish has incorporated the formerly separate parish of Hedgerley Dean since 1934 (which was once a hamlet in parish of Farnham Royal).

The toponym name "Hedgerley" is derived from the Old English meaning "Hycga's woodland clearing". In manorial rolls in 1195 it was recorded as Huggeleg.

== Architecture and geography ==
Situated in the foothills of the Chiltern Hills, Hedgerley is a linear layout of red-brick and timber-framed cottages, amongst which Victoria Cottages date from the 16th century. It is bounded to the north by the M40 motorway.

The old Quaker House on the northern edge of the village dates from 1487.

The Church of England parish church of Saint Mary the Virgin was designed by the Gothic Revival architect Benjamin Ferrey and built in 1852. The Tudor Revival Rectory was built in 1846.

== In film, fiction and the media ==
The 1953 British film Genevieve was shot on roads around Pinewood Studios and the couples stop for a “hair of the dog” at the old (now demolished) One Pin pub with Genevieve seen driving down Hedgerley Hill as well as actors John Gregson and Dinah Sheridan filmed in Collinswood Road.

Scenes from Lionel Jeffries' 1972 family film The Amazing Mr Blunden were filmed in the village and at the church.

The village including the fields and woods of the parish featured in the episode "Secrets & Spies" of Midsomer Murders.

== Demography ==
2011 Published Statistics: Population, home ownership and extracts from Physical Environment, surveyed in 2005
Output area	Homes owned outright	Owned with a loan	Socially rented	Privately rented	Other	km^{2} roads	km^{2} water	km^{2} domestic gardens	km^{2} domestic buildings	km^{2} non-domestic buildings	Usual residents	km^{2}
Civil parish	125	126	66	36	3	0.113	0.016	0.243	0.033	0.014	873	6.8

The village's most notable resident was the infamous Judge Jeffreys (1645–89).

A few fields in the parish are called the sea fields as in spring they become full with bluebells.

== Sources ==
- Pevsner, Nikolaus (1973) [1966]. The Buildings of England: Buckinghamshire. Harmondsworth: Penguin Books. p. 160. ISBN 0-14-071019-1.
