= Thomas Wharton =

Thomas Wharton may refer to:

- Thomas Wharton, 1st Baron Wharton (1495–1568), English nobleman
- Thomas Wharton, 2nd Baron Wharton (1520–1572), English nobleman
- Thomas Wharton (died 1622) (1588–1622), son of the 3rd Baron Wharton, father of the 4th Baron Wharton
- Thomas Wharton (anatomist) (1614–1673), English anatomist
- Thomas Wharton (died 1684) (c. 1615–1684), English politician, son of Thomas Wharton (died 1622)
- Thomas Wharton, 1st Marquess of Wharton (1648–1715), English nobleman and politician, credited with being the lyricist of Lilliburlero
- Thomas Wharton Jr. (1735–1778), American politician and 1st President of Pennsylvania
- Thomas Wharton (children's writer), American artist
- Thomas Wharton (author) (born 1963), Canadian novelist
- Tiny Wharton (Tom Wharton, 1927–2005), Scottish soccer referee

== See also ==
- Thomas Warton the elder (c. 1688–1745), English clergyman, schoolmaster and poet
- Thomas Warton (the younger) (1728–1790), English literary historian, critic, and Poet Laureate
