= Charles Tynte =

Charles Tynte may refer to:

- Sir Charles Tynte, 5th Baronet (1710–1785)
- Charles Kemeys-Tynte (1800–1882), English Liberal politician
- Charles Kemeys-Tynte (1778–1860), English Whig and Liberal politician
- Charles Kemeys-Tynte, 8th Baron Wharton (1876–1934)
- John Kemeys-Tynte, 9th Baron Wharton (Charles John Halswell Kemys-Tynte, 1908–1969)
