= Lord Wharton =

Lord Wharton may refer to:

- Baron Wharton, a title in the Peerage of England created in 1544 and in error in 1916
- Earl of Wharton, a title in the Peerage of England created in 1706 and forfeit in 1729
- Marquess of Wharton, a title in the Peerage of Great Britain created in 1715 and forfeit in 1729
- Duke of Wharton, a title in the Peerage of Great Britain created in 1718 and forfeit in 1729
- James Wharton, Baron Wharton of Yarm (born 1984), British politician and Conservative member of Parliament
