= Charles Wharton =

Charles Wharton may refer to:

- Charles Wharton (MP), Member of Parliament (MP) for Berwick-upon-Tweed
- Charles S. Wharton (1875–1939), U.S. Representative from Illinois
- Charles Wharton (American football) (1868–1949), American football player
- Charles Kemeys-Tynte, 8th Baron Wharton (1876–1934)
- Charles John Halswell Kemys-Tynte, 9th Baron Wharton
- Charles Henry Wharton (1748–1833), Episcopal clergyman and president of Columbia University

== See also ==
- Charles Warton (1832–1900), politician and businessman
