= Thomas Wharton (died 1684) =

English politician

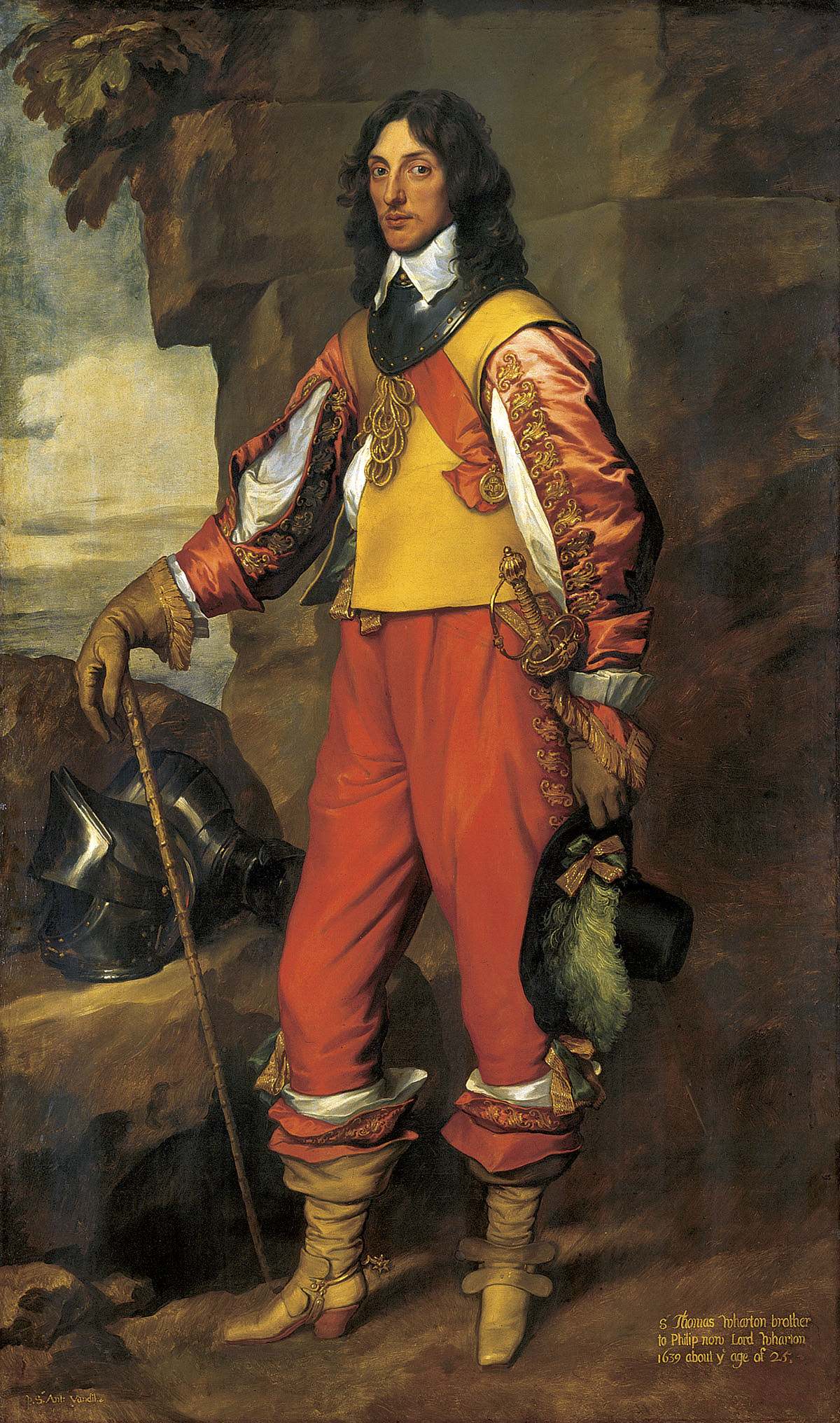
Sir Thomas Wharton by Anthony van Dyck (1639)

Sir Thomas Wharton KB (c. 1615 – 30 October 1684) was an English politician who sat in the House of Commons in 1659 and 1660.

Wharton was the son of Sir Thomas Wharton of Aske Hall and his wife Lady Philadelphia Carey, daughter of Robert Carey, 1st Earl of Monmouth and Elizabeth Trevannion. His father died in 1622. He was educated at Eton College from 1624 to 1625 and matriculated at Exeter College, Oxford on 3 March 1626, aged 11. He was created Knight of the Bath on 2 February 1626. From 1629 to 1632 he travelled abroad in France and entered Lincoln's Inn in 1638.

In 1659, Wharton was elected Member of Parliament for Westmorland in the Third Protectorate Parliament. He was re-elected MP for Westmorland in 1660 for the Convention Parliament. He was Warden of the Mint along with his son Philip from 1681-1684.

Wharton married firstly in 1645, his cousin Lady Mary Carey daughter of Henry Carey, 1st Earl of Dover and had a son, Philip, and three daughters. She died in June 1672 and he married secondly by licence dated 20 April 1677, Jane Robinson, widow of Leonard Robinson of Ravensworth, Yorkshire and daughter of Rowland Dand of Mansfield Woodhouse, Nottinghamshire. They had two daughters. His elder brother Philip inherited the barony from their grandfather.

Thomas Wharton's son Philip was the father of Mary Wharton, the divorced wife of James Campbell of Burnbank, Lanarkshire and daughter. Through her mother Elizabeth Hutton, Mary was also heiress to Goldsborough Hall and its estates. Mary was just 13 years old when she was abducted from her carriage in front of her guardian and great-aunt Anne Byerley and forced to marry Campbell. Her two-day marriage was annulled by an Act of Parliament in 1690; she married her cousin Robert Byerley on 17 March 1692 and lived at Goldsborough Hall, North Yorkshire.

Parliament of England
Preceded by Thomas Burton; Christopher Lister	Member of Parliament for Westmorland; 1659; With: Thomas Burton	Succeeded by Not represented in restored Rump
Preceded by Not represented in restored Rump	Member of Parliament for Westmorland; 1660; With: Sir John Lowther	Succeeded by Sir Thomas Strickland; Sir Philip Musgrave
