= Jane Wharton, 7th Baroness Wharton =

Lady Jane Wharton (1706–1761), considered de jure 7th Baroness Wharton, was the daughter of Thomas Wharton, 1st Marquess of Wharton by his second wife Lucy Loftus, and sister of Philip Wharton, 1st Duke of Wharton.

Lady Jane married first John Holt (d.1728), a nephew of Sir John Holt. She married secondly in 1733 Robert Coke, of the family of Sir Edward Coke, and Vice-Chamberlain to Queen Caroline. She died without issue from either marriage. On the death of her brother Philip in 1731, the family peerages, including Marquess and Duke of Wharton, became extinct. After the death of her sister Lady Lucy Morice, Lady Jane was the only surviving heir of the 1st Marquess of Wharton, until her death without issue.

== Wharton barony revived ==
In 1844, the extinct title Baron Wharton was claimed by Colonel Charles Kemeys-Tynte, formerly a member of parliament from 1820 to 1837. The documents that had created that peerage in 1544 had been lost, so the House of Lords's Committee for Privileges ruled (erroneously) that the barony had been created by writ, meaning that it would descend to heirs general. By this application of the succession, it was ruled that Lady Jane Coke had been Baroness Wharton in her own right, from her sister's death in 1739 to her own death. Colonel Kemeys-Tynte's claim came from his descent from Lady Jane's grandfather the 4th Baron, as after Jane's death the succession would be divided among his daughters' descendants, including Kemeys-Tynte.

The House of Lords did not act upon the barony (which it now considered to be in abeyance) due to the Duke of Wharton's status as an outlaw, but in 1916 Colonel Kemeys-Tynte's great-great-grandson, also named Charles Kemeys-Tynte, succeeded in having the title called out of abeyance in his favour. Because the Duke of Wharton was the 6th Baron Wharton and Lady Jane Coke was considered to have held the barony after him, the new Lord Wharton was counted as the 8th Baron. As the succession of the title between 1731 and 1916 is based on different rules than the (lost) ones actually implemented in 1544, he may be more properly considered the 1st Baron of a new creation given the precedence of 1544, but the so-called 7th Baroness is the only intervening person considered to have held the title at all.

Peerage of England
In abeyance from 1731 Title last held by Philip Wharton	Baroness Wharton de jure 1739–1761	In abeyance to 1916 Title next held by Charles Kemeys-Tynte
