= Henry Carey, 2nd Earl of Monmouth =

English politician (1596–1661)

The Right Honourable The Earl of Monmouth KB
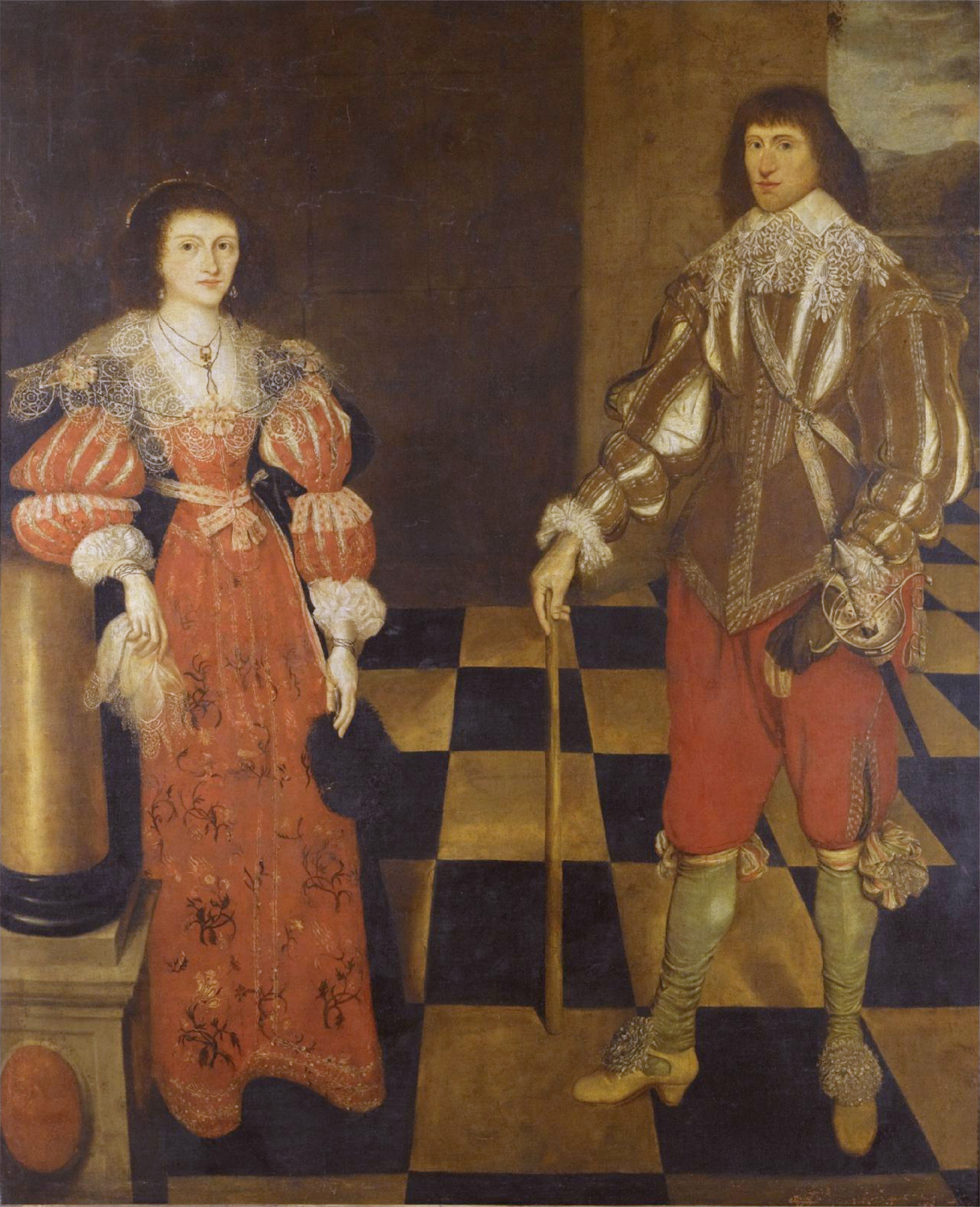
- The Earl of Monmouth and his wife.

Member of the England Parliament for Camelford
- In office 1621–1622 Serving with Edward Carr
- Preceded by: George Cotton; Robert Naunton
- Succeeded by: Francis Cottington; Edward Hare

Member of the England Parliament for Beverley
- In office 1624–1625 Serving with Edmund Scott
- Preceded by: Edmund Scott; Sir Henry Vane
- Succeeded by: Sir John Hotham; Sir William Alford

Member of the England Parliament for Tregony
- In office 1625–1625 Serving with Sebastian Goode
- Preceded by: Peter Specott; Ambrose Manaton
- Succeeded by: Thomas Carey; Sir Robert Killigrew

Member of the England Parliament for St Mawes
- In office 1629–1629 Serving with William Carr
- Preceded by: John Arundell; Nathaniel Tomkins
- Succeeded by: Thomas Carey; Hannibal Vyvyan

Personal details
- Born: 15 January 1595 Denham, Buckinghamshire
- Died: 13 June 1661 (aged 65) Rickmansworth, Hertfordshire
- Spouse: Martha Cranfield
- Parents: Robert Carey, 1st Earl of Monmouth (father); Elizabeth Trevannion (mother)

Henry Carey, 2nd Earl of Monmouth, KB (15 January 1596 – 13 June 1661), known as Sir Henry Carey between 1616 and 1626 and as Lord Leppington between 1626 and 1639, was an English nobleman and translator.

== Life ==
He was born in Denham, Buckinghamshire, to Sir Robert Carey (later 1st Earl of Monmouth) and Elizabeth Trevannion. He appears to have spent his childhood at the various places of residence which his father occupied from time to time on the borders, but after the death of Queen Elizabeth I he lived in the atmosphere of the court. He entered as a fellow commoner at Exeter College, Oxford, during Lent term 1611, and took the Bachelor of Arts degree in February 1613.

He spent the next three years in travelling on the continent and in acquiring that knowledge of foreign languages for which he became afterwards so distinguished. Returning to England during the autumn of 1616 he was one of twenty-six personages—and the only one of the number whose father was not a nobleman (his father being still a knight at this point)—who were made Knights of the Bath in November of that year on the occasion of Prince Charles (later King Charles I) being created Prince of Wales. He showed no inclination for the life of a courtier, and his parents busied themselves during the next year or two in making for their son some advantageous alliance. After feebly objecting to more than one of the proposals, he was at last married in 1620 to Martha Cranfield, eldest daughter of Sir Lionel Cranfield, who eventually became Lord High Treasurer of England and 1st Earl of Middlesex.

From this time he seems to have lived in retirement among his books in the country. He became Lord Leppington (a courtesy title derived from the territorial designation of his father's junior title, Baron Carey) in 1626 on his father's creation as Earl of Monmouth. His father's death in 1639 and his consequent succession as 2nd Earl of Monmouth made little change in his habits. Only once does he appear to have come forward to take part in the conflicts of the turbulent times, when he spoke in the House of Lords in June 1641 on the bill for depriving the bishops of their seats in parliament. When Charles I issued the famous declaration and profession in June 1642, Monmouth's name appears among the signatures, but from this time he retired from all political life, and henceforth till his death he was busily engaged in translating various works from the Italian and French, and letting the world go by him as if he had no interest in its concerns. The truth is that he had inherited none of the immense physical vigour and energy of his father and grandfather, and if he had any ambition there is no evidence to show that his abilities were at all more than respectable.

Horace Walpole's judgement upon him is probably correct:

Though there are several large volumes translated by him, we have scarce anything of his own composition, and are as little acquainted with his character as with his genius.

He served four terms as a member of parliament, representing Camelford, Beverley, Tregony and St Mawes between 1621 and 1626.

His titles became extinct upon his death in Rickmansworth, Hertfordshire on 13 June 1661.

== Translated works ==
Carey translated Virgilio Malvezzi's Romulus and Tarquin from the original Italian in 1637, and Giovanni Biondi's An History of the Civill Warres of England.. in 1641, also from the Italian. The Complete History of the Wars of Flanders, by Cardinal Guido Bentivoglio, followed in 1654. In 1658, Monmouth translated Paolo Paruta's Istoria Veneziana (The History of Venice) from Italian into English, the text was subsequently published in London in the same year. His last translation, Gualdo Priorato's The History of France, remained unfinished at Monmouth's death, and was completed in 1676 by William Brent.

== Children ==
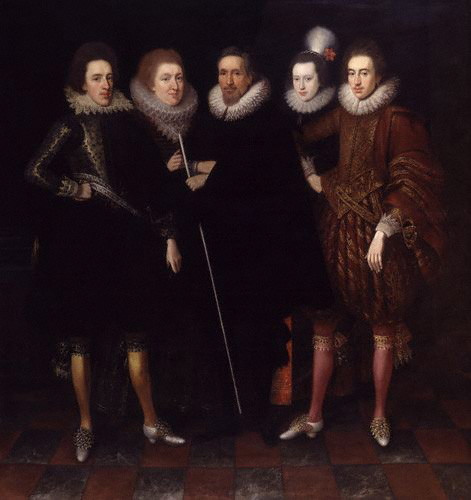
The 2nd Earl of Monmouth (left), posing with members of his family, c. 1617.

Henry married Martha Cranfield, daughter of Lionel Cranfield, 1st Earl of Middlesex and Elizabeth Shepard. Henry and Martha had ten children.

1. Lionel Carey (born about 1622). Killed at the Battle of Marston Moor on 2 July 1644 while fighting for the Royalists.
2. Henry Carey (1623 – 5 November 1649) married Lady Mary Scrope
3. Lady Anne Carey (c. 1626 – 15 January 1688/89) married (1) James Hamilton (2) Robert Maxwell
4. Lady Philadelphia Carey (born c. 1628 – died before June 1661)
5. Lady Elizabeth Carey (born c. 1630 – 14 December 1676)
6. Lady Mary Carey (born c. 1632 – died after 1682) married William Feilding, 3rd Earl of Denbigh
7. Lady Trevaniana Carey (born c. 1634 – died before June 1661)
8. Lady Martha Carey (born c. 1635 – 23 January 1705) married John Middleton
9. Lady Theophila Carey (born c. 1637 – died before June 1661)
10. Lady Magdalena Carey (born c. 1639 – died before June 1661)

== Sources ==
- thepeerage.com. Retrieved 21 March 2008
- Doyle, James William Edmund. The Official Baronage of England, Showing the Succession, Dignities, and Offices of Every Peer from 1066 to 1885, with Sixteen Hundred Illustrations. (p. 507) London: Longmans, Green, 1886.googlebooks. Retrieved 21 March 2008
- familysearch.org. Retrieved 21 March 2008
- Lord, E. (September 2004). "Carey, Henry, second earl of Monmouth (1596–1661)". Oxford Dictionary of National Biography (online ed.). Oxford University Press. doi:10.1093/ref:odnb/4650. (Subscription, Wikipedia Library access or UK public library membership required.)

Parliament of England
Preceded by George Cotton; Robert Naunton	Member of Parliament for Camelford; 1621–1622; With: Edward Carr	Succeeded by Francis Cottington; Edward Hare
Preceded by Edmund Scott; Henry Vane the Elder	Member of Parliament for Beverley; 1624–1625; With: Edmund Scott	Succeeded by Sir John Hotham, Bt; Sir William Alford
Preceded by Peter Specott; Ambrose Manaton	Member of Parliament for Tregony; 1625; With: Sebastian Goode	Succeeded by Thomas Carey; Sir Robert Kelligrew
Preceded by John Arundell; Nathaniel Tomkins	Member of Parliament for St Mawes; 1626; With: William Carr	Succeeded by Thomas Carey; Hannibal Vyvyan
Peerage of England
Preceded by Robert Carey	Earl of Monmouth; First creation 1639–1661	Extinct
