= Philip Wharton, 3rd Baron Wharton =

English peer

Philip Wharton, 3rd Baron Wharton (1555–1625) was an English peer of the Wharton barony.

== Life ==
He was born on 23 June 1555. Wharton was named after his godfather, Philip II of Spain. He succeeded his father Thomas Wharton, 2nd Baron Wharton when he was 17 years old. He owned land in Grisedale.

In August 1594 he travelled with his guardian Earl of Sussex to Stirling Castle for ceremonies and masques at the christening of Prince Henry of Scotland.

Notable in his life was his entertaining King James in 1617 which, as was common in those days, nearly bankrupted him. In 1618 his debts amounted to £16,713 on an annual income of £2,107.

== Personal life ==
Wharton was married twice, first to Frances Clifford, second daughter of Henry Clifford, 2nd Earl of Cumberland, in 1577. She died in 1592 and about 1597 he married Dorothy Colby (d. 1621).

He had two sons by Frances Clifford:

1. Sir George (d. 1609) who married Lady Anne Manners, daughter of John Manners, 4th Earl of Rutland, and was killed in a duel without issue.
2. Thomas of Aske(d. 1622). His son Philip inherited the barony on his grandfather's death.

== Death ==
Wharton died in 1625 and was buried at Healaugh.

Peerage of England
Preceded by Thomas Wharton	Baron Wharton; 1572–1625	Succeeded by Philip Wharton
