= Elizabeth Trevannion =

English aristocrat and keeper of Prince Charles

Elizabeth Trevannion, Countess of Monmouth (died 1641), was an English aristocrat and keeper of Prince Charles.

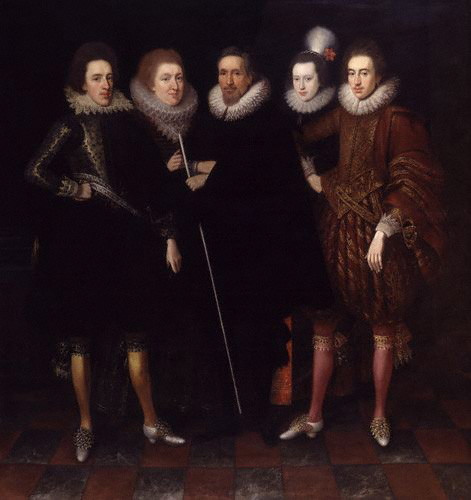
The Monmouth family, by Paul van Somer

Elizabeth Trevannion or Trevanion was a daughter of Hugh Trevannion of St Michael Caerhays and Sybilla Morgan of Lockstowe or Arkestone, Herefordshire. Their home was Caerhays Castle.

== Career ==
She first married Sir Henry Widdrington of Widdrington Castle. After his death in 1592, she married Robert Carey on 20 Aug 1593. They were first cousins, Robert's mother Anne Carey was the elder sister of Sybilla Morgan. According to Carey's memoir, she came to live with him at Carlisle Castle, where he was deputy to the border official Lord Scrope. Carey left this employment shortly after the birth of their daughter. They lived at Widdrington for a time, and then at Denham near Uxbridge, where their son was born in January 1596.

After the Union of Crowns in 1603, Prince Charles remained in Scotland at Dunfermline Palace in the keeping of Alexander Seton. Elizabeth Carey was sworn in as a lady in waiting of the privy chamber and Mistress of her Majesty's Sweet Coffers to Anne of Denmark, in charge of perfuming the queen's wardrobe. The occasion, at Windsor Castle, was probably 2 July 1603, when the "great ladies" paid homage to Anne of Denmark in turn, "most sumptuous in apparel, and exceeding rich and glorious in jewels". This event was held in parallel with the installation of King James' Knights of the Garter. Lady Anne Clifford described an "infinite company of lords of ladies" and an "infinite number of ladies sworn of the Queen's Privy Chamber".

In November 1603 the Spanish ambassador, the Count of Villamediana, invited the Duke of Lennox and the Earl of Mar to dinner. According to Arbella Stuart, he asked them "to bring the Scottish ladies for he was desirous to see some natural beauties". The women from the Queen's household who accepted this invitation included Jane Drummond (who had been involved in the care of Prince Charles in Scotland), the young Anna Hay, and Lady Carey. The ambassador gave her a present of Spanish leather gloves at the dinner, and afterwards sent a gold chain of little links that went twice about her neck. These were diplomatic gifts intended to leverage support for Spanish policy at court.

Alexander Seton and his wife Grizel Leslie brought Prince Charles to England. He met his parents at Easton Neston and was lodged at Oatlands Palace. On 23 February 1605 Lady Carey was made the governess of Prince Charles, who was now known as the "Duke of York". Between 1604 and 1611, the young prince flourished with the Careys, learning to both ride and shoot.

Lady Carey's daughter, Philadelphia, was brought up in the household of Princess Elizabeth at Coombe Abbey, in the care of Lord Harington.

Robert Carey was made Earl of Monmouth in 1626. Their main residence was Moor Park.

Elizabeth Carey, Countess of Monmouth died in 1641 at Monmouth House in Watford and was buried at Rickmansworth.

== The gunpowder plot and the household of Prince Charles ==
Several Scottish servants came south with the Prince from Dunfermline, including his laundry-woman Agnes Fortune and the elder George Kirke. In 1605 Agnes Fortune testified that one of the Gunpowder Plot conspirators Thomas Percy had asked her questions about Charles' lodging at Whitehall Palace and his activities. She recognised Percy because she had seen him before with Lady Carey at Greenwich Palace. Percy asked her about the way from the Hall to the Duke's private lodging, and she mentioned that Lady Carey had altered the access route to make it more secure and private. Fortune told Percy if he stayed a "bonnie while" he could meet the Duke and Sir Robert Carey.

According to Thomas Winter's confession, Percy was planning to "carry the Duke safe away" after the explosion at the House of Lords. The plan to capture Charles was mentioned in a Latin narrative of the discovery of the Gunpowder plot sent to Christian IV of Denmark, and was said to have been abandoned in favour of taking Princess Elizabeth. The incident seems not to have affected Agnes Fortune's career, as she remained "laundress for the Prince's body" until the household broke up in 1611.

In October 1607 Lady Carey heard there would be an investigation of the management of Prince Henry's household. She wrote to King James asking that the Duke of York's household should also be reviewed, since there was not always enough money allowed for food.

== Family ==
Her children included:

- Henry Carey, 2nd Earl of Monmouth (1596–1661)
- Thomas Carey (1598–1634), who married Margaret Smith, daughter of Thomas Smith.
- Philadelphia Carey (d. 1655), who married Sir Thomas Wharton and was the mother of Philip Wharton, 4th Baron Wharton.
