= Thomas Carey (English politician) =

English politician (1597–1634)

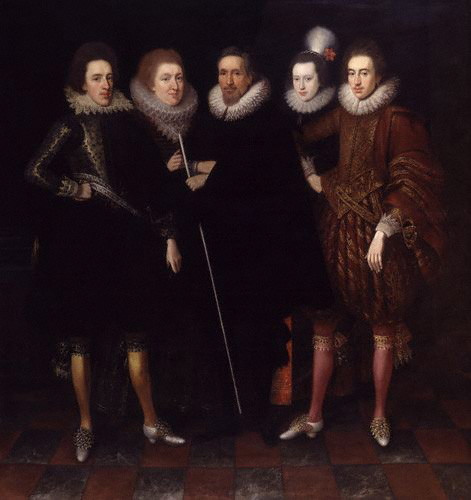
Carey (right), with members of his family including his father, the Earl of Monmouth (centre)

Thomas Carey (1597–1634) was a courtier to Charles I and English member of parliament.

== Life ==
He was born 16 September 1597, the second son of Robert Carey, 1st Earl of Monmouth and Elizabeth Trevannion. He was tutored within his father's household by Henry Burton. He became groom of the bedchamber to Charles, then Prince of Wales, in 1616 and retained that post until his death. In 1617 he was sent with Sir John Digby to Madrid and subsequently travelled in France and Germany. When Giles Mompesson was expelled from his parliamentary seat of Great Bedwyn in 1621, he was returned at the subsequent by-election as the Court candidate despite his lack of local connections.

In 1623 he was sent to Madrid in the wake of Prince Charles and Buckingham. In December 1624, he went to France with letters and jewels for Henrietta Maria.

Between 1624 and 1929 Carey was elected for Cornish constituencies through the influence of his mother's links to the local gentry. He represented Helston (1624–25), Tregony (1625–26) and St Mawes (1628–29). He was granted Sunninghill Park in Berkshire by the king in 1630. Carey was preparing to go on embassy to Venice, when his health failed and he died in 1634. He was buried in Westminster Abbey.

== Family ==
Carey married, Margaret, daughter of the Master of Requests, Thomas Smith of Abingdon, Berkshire (now Oxfordshire) & Parson's Green, Middlesex and his wife, Frances, later Countess of Exeter. They had three daughters:

- Philadelphia married Sir Henry Lyttelton, 2nd Baronet.
- Frances
- Elizabeth married John Mordaunt, 1st Viscount Mordaunt.

After Carey died, Margaret married Sir Edward Herbert.

== Notes ==
Parliament of England
Preceded by Sir Thomas Stafford; William Noy	Member of Parliament for Helston; 1624–1625; With: Francis Carew	Succeeded by Francis Godolphin; Francis Carew
Preceded by Sir Henry Carey; Sebastian Goode	Member of Parliament for Tregony; 1625–1626; With: Sir Robert Killigrew	Succeeded by Francis Rous; Sir John Arundell
Preceded by Sir Henry Carey; William Carr	Member of Parliament for St Mawes; 1628–1629; With: Hannibal Vyvyan	Succeeded by Dr George Parry; Lord Sheffield
