= Ambrose Manaton =

English politician

Ambrose Manaton (1589 – 1 June 1651) was an English politician who sat in the House of Commons of England in 1624 and 1640. He supported the Royalist side in the English Civil War.

Manaton was the second son of Peter Manaton of Trecarrell in Cornwall and his wife Ann Edgecumbe, daughter of Pierce Edgecumbe of Mount Edgecumbe.

In 1621 Manaton was elected Member of Parliament for Bossiney. He was elected MP for Tregoney in 1624. In 1627, he was called to the bar at Lincoln's Inn. He became a master of chancery extraordinary and recorder of Launceston.

Manaton was next elected as MP for Launceston in April 1640 for the Short Parliament. He was re-elected in November 1640 for the Long Parliament and sat until 1641 when he was disabled for supporting King Charles I. Manaton was created D.C.L. at the University of Oxford on 21 March 1644. He entertained King Charles at his house in 1644.

Manaton died in 1651 and was buried at South Petherwin, where his monument displayed the arms of Manaton and Reskymer, and Manaton and Edgcombe.

Manaton married as his second wife Jane Mapowder daughter of Narcissus Mapowder of Holsworthy, Devon. Their sons Ambrose and Henry were both subsequently Members of Parliament.

Parliament of England
Preceded by William Hakewill; Thomas Malet	Member of Parliament for Tregoney; 1624–1625; With: Peter Specott	Succeeded by Sir Henry Carey; Sebastian Goode
Vacant Parliament suspended since 1629	Member of Parliament for Launceston; 1640–1641; With: Bevil Grenville 1640; William Coryton 1640–1641	Succeeded by John Harris; Thomas Gewen
