= Elizabeth Mordaunt, Viscountess Mordaunt =

English royalist conspirator and diarist (1632/3 – 1679)

The Right Honourable The Viscountess Mordaunt
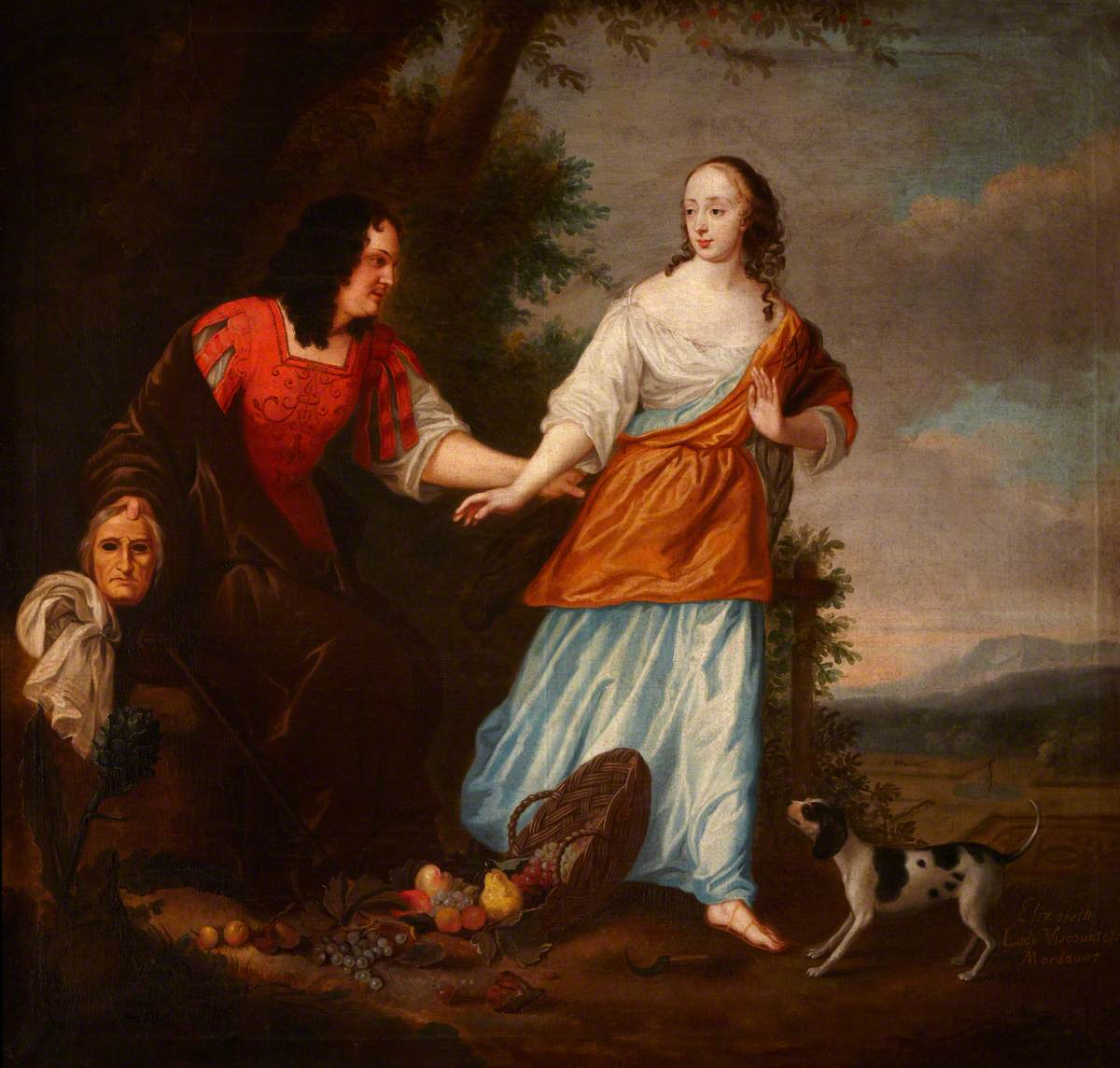
- Elizabeth Carey in 1656, after an original by Louise Hollandine of the Palatinate
- Born: Elizabeth Carey, 1632/3
- Died: 1679
- Spouse: John Mordaunt, 1st Viscount Mordaunt
- Children: 11+, including Charles
- Parent(s): Thomas Carey; Margaret Smith

Elizabeth Mordaunt, Viscountess Mordaunt (née Carey, 1632/3 – 1679) was an English royalist conspirator and diarist. She is credited with contriving the acquittal of her husband, the zealous but unsuccessful conspirator John Mordaunt, for treason in 1658, and she acted as an intelligencer for the royalist network in 1659. A lifelong friend of writer John Evelyn, she kept a private devotional diary which was published in 1856.

== Early life ==
She was born in 1632/3, one of three daughters of Thomas Carey, gentleman of the bedchamber to Charles I, and his wife Margaret, née Smith. Her father died in 1634.

When she was fifteen or sixteen and staying in Paris, she met Mary Browne and the writer John Evelyn, who would soon marry Mary. The three of them remained lifelong friends. Evelyn described the young Elizabeth as well-read and pious, with many admirers: she 'would entertaine them all, & was...full of a thousand pretty impertinences.'

Elizabeth’s 'breezy, phonetically spelled letters' to Evelyn show that she spent time in London and with her grandmother in Winchester in 1655. In 1656, after a first matchmaking attempt failed, Evelyn suggested that she marry John Mordaunt, whom he had met on his travels in Italy.

Elizabeth’s mother was staying at the court of Elizabeth Stuart, Queen of Bohemia at the Hague. During one of her stays with her mother in 1656/7, Louise, Princess Palatine, the Queen’s daughter, painted her in the character of the nymph Pomona and another portrait, which was given to Mary Evelyn at her request.

== Royalist conspirator ==
In May 1657 Elizabeth married John Mordaunt, and quickly aligned herself with his efforts to re-establish Charles II as king. Fellow royalist Edward Hyde described her shortly after the marriage as 'a young beautiful lady, of a very loyal spirit, and notable vivacity of wit and humour, who concurred with him [John] in all honourable dedication of himself.' Their first son, Charles, was born early the next year.

=== Treason trial ===
A major test of her commitment came in April 1658 when John was arrested for conspiring to raise troops for Charles II as part of the future king’s 'Great Trust and Commission.' When he was tried on 1 June by a special commission of forty, Elizabeth contrived to have him reprieved by a slender margin. She bribed some of the judges to get information on how they would conduct the trial, and managed to have advice handed to her husband by note. She persuaded one of the witnesses, Morley/Mallory, to escape, by letting him know that his promise of indemnity if he testified against John had been false. Allegedly, he was provided with money and a disguise by the Mordaunts' maid to help his escape. When another witness fell ill, there were nineteen votes for conviction and nineteen for acquittal: the president of the court, who owed a favour to John’s mother, cast his deciding vote in John’s favour. John had a further period of imprisonment before his release, and Elizabeth chose to share it with him, after having her clothes and hair searched for papers.

=== Intelligencer in Calais ===
In July 1659, John’s arrest was ordered for a second attempt at arranging an uprising, and Elizabeth also 'intended to escape, being much sought for by the rebels in England.' He escaped to France in September and Elizabeth, whose second child had been born in April that year, joined him a month later. Remaining in Calais alone, she began the main phase of her role as a Royalist intelligencer, passing encrypted letters between her husband, the king, and other conspirators, with the support of the Queen of Bohemia. Her relatives acknowledged how much she enjoyed the danger of it:

since you have escaped the danger, cannot say I am very sorrie you have been in some, for in the age we live, tis not easie to sever suffering from the honour of doing one’s dutie; And I know you prefere that so much before the lazy quiet most here place their happinesse in.

Her diary for this period records occasional thanks to God for deliverance from danger and asks forgiveness for dissembling and lying.

== Post-Restoration life ==
After the Restoration of Charles II in 1660, John was made viscount and Constable of Windsor. The Mordaunts had a residence at Windsor and another at Parsons Green, Fulham, which survived the Great Fire of London. Elizabeth had to deal with John’s continued troubles, including his impeachment after an accusation of false imprisonment and attempted rape in 1666 and a property dispute with his brother in 1672–4. In July 1674 their house and goods were seized, and she was only able to pay the household debts when she received delayed payments from the Exchequer after John’s death in 1675.

Throughout her life she kept up a pattern of charitable giving, usually on the anniversaries of events she was thankful for, like her husband’s acquittal for treason. She was assisted in these in her widowhood by Evelyn.

She died on a convalescent visit to France in 1679. Her diary records the births of eleven children in total, including Charles and Harry Mordaunt.

== Diary ==
From 1656/7 she kept a private devotional diary, where she recorded her reactions to everything from disagreements with her mother-in-law and concern over her children’s illnesses, to her feelings on the Restoration of the Monarchy. The diary also contains poetry, such as a verse on the birth of her son Louis. It was published as The Priuate Diaree of Elizabeth, Viscountess Mordaunt in 1856.
