= Elisabeth Kemeys-Tynte, 10th Baroness Wharton =

English peer (1906–1974)

Elisabeth Dorothy Kemys-Tynte, 10th Baroness Wharton (4 May 1906 – 4 May 1974), an English peeress, was the daughter of Charles Theodore Halswell Kemeys-Tynte, 8th Baron Wharton. She inherited the barony from her brother John Kemeys-Tynte, 9th Baron Wharton.

Kemeys-Tynte married first on 17 May 1933 (divorced 1946) David George Arbuthnot (7 April 1905 – 14 November 1985), eldest son of John Bernard Arbuthnot and maternal uncle of journalists Alexander Cockburn, Andrew Cockburn, and Patrick Cockburn. They had two daughters. She married second 1946 (div 1958) St John Vintcent, with no issue.

After her death, the Barony went into abeyance for sixteen years until 1990 when it was brought out of abeyance in favour of her elder daughter, Ziki Robertson.

== Children ==
1. Hon Myrtle Olive Felix Arbuthnot (1934–2000), later 11th Baroness Wharton as of 1990. She married Henry MacLeod Robertson (d. 1996), with issue;
2. Hon Caroline Elizabeth Arbuthnot, wife of Capt Jonathan Cecil Appleyard-List CBE RN, with issue.

Peerage of England
Preceded by John Kemeys-Tynte	Baroness Wharton; 1969–1974	Succeeded by Ziki Robertson
