= Baron Wharton =

Title in the Peerage of England

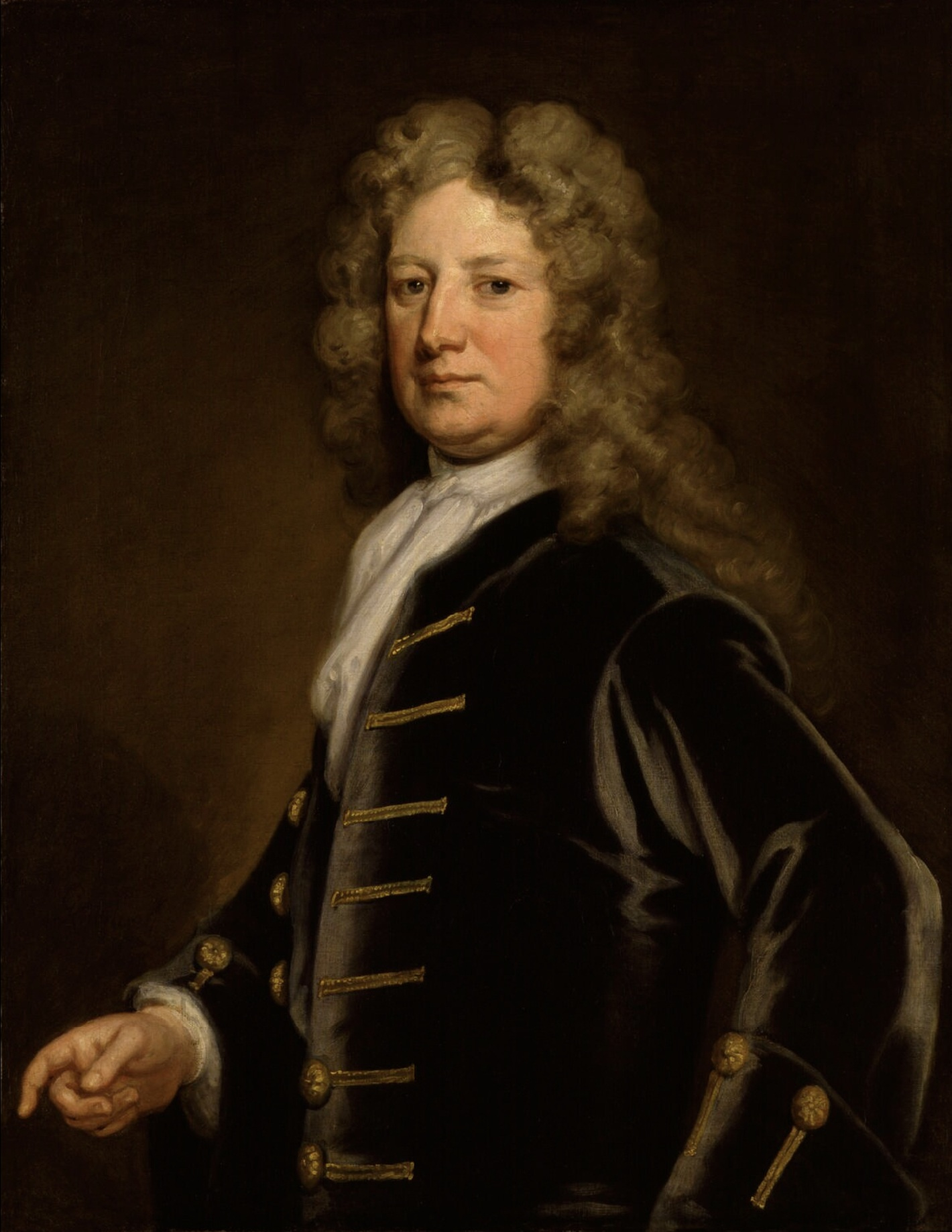
Thomas Wharton, 5th Baron Wharton

Baron Wharton is a title in the Peerage of England, originally granted by letters patent to the heirs male of the 1st Baron, which was forfeited in 1729 when the last male-line heir was declared an outlaw. The Barony was erroneously revived in 1916 by writ of summons, thanks to an 1844 decision in the House of Lords based on absence of documentation. As such, the current Barony of Wharton could more accurately be listed as a new Barony, created in 1916, with the precedence of the older (and extinct) Barony.

== The barony of 1544 ==
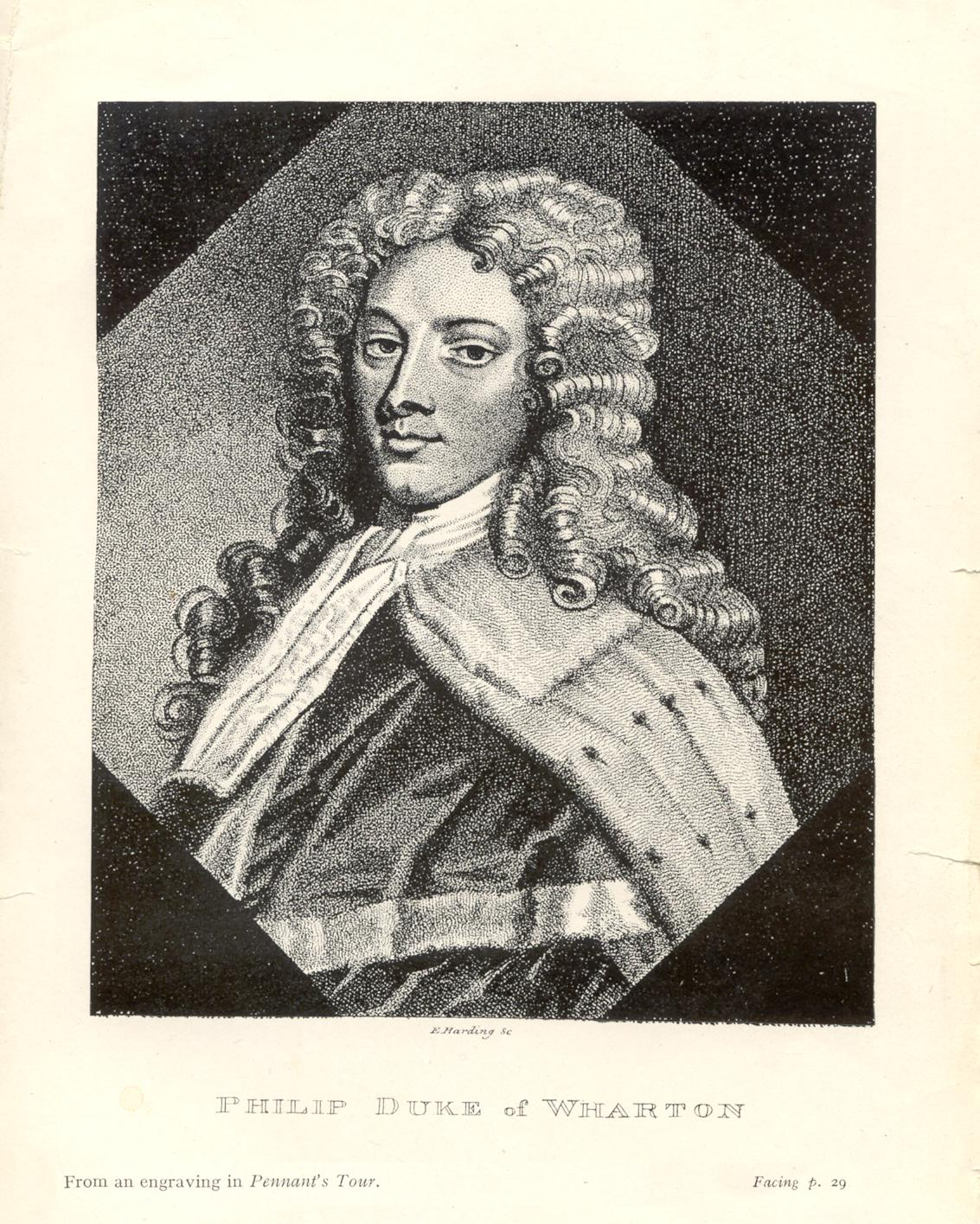
Philip Wharton, 1st Duke of Wharton.

The title Baron Wharton was created in 1544 by letters patent for Sir Thomas Wharton, who had previously served as a member of parliament for Cumberland, in recognition of his victory at the Battle of Solway Moss. Because of its creation by letters patent, the Barony could only be passed down to male heirs.

The 5th Baron (1648–1715) had a long and distinguished political career, serving at various times as a member of parliament, Lord Lieutenant of Oxford and Buckingham, Lord Lieutenant of Ireland and Lord Privy Seal. He was created Earl of Wharton, in the County of Westmorland, and Viscount Winchendon, of Winchendon in the County of Buckingham, in 1706, in the Peerage of England, and in 1715 was further created Marquess of Wharton, in the County of Westmorland, and Marquess of Malmesbury, in the County of Wilts, in the Peerage of Great Britain. Later that year, he was also created Marquess of Catherlough, (Note: The Marquessate of Catherlough referred to the Irish town now spelled Carlow.) Earl of Rathfarnham, in the County of Dublin, and Baron Trim, in the County of Meath, in the Peerage of Ireland.

His son, the 2nd Marquess (1698–1731), was created Duke of Wharton, in the County of Westmorland, in the Peerage of Great Britain, in 1718, but all the titles were forfeit in 1729 when the Duke of Wharton was declared an outlaw. In any event, since on the Duke's death there were no male heirs of the 1st Baron remaining, all the titles would have become extinct at that point.

== The Barony revived, or new Barony created ==
In 1844, however, the Barony was claimed by Colonel Charles Kemeys-Tynte, and, since the document creating the peerage had been lost, the Committee for Privileges of the House of Lords ruled erroneously that the Barony was created by writ and could therefore be passed down through the female line. As a consequence of their resolution, it was determined that at the death of the Duke of Wharton, the Barony had fallen into abeyance between the Duke's sisters, Lady Jane Holt and Lady Lucy Morice. It was further determined that, at Lady Lucy's death in 1739, Lady Jane (by now Lady Jane Coke) remained the sole heir, and had been therefore entitled to the Barony. Finally, it was determined that at her death the Barony again fell into abeyance, where it remained in the nineteenth century. The Committee for Privileges, however, also ruled that it did not have the authority to terminate the abeyance because of the existence of a judgement of outlawry against the Duke of Wharton. The matter remained unresolved for 72 years.

On 15 February 1916, the abeyance was terminated by a writ of summons from King George V to Parliament in favour of Charles Theodore Halswell Kemeys-Tynte, who became the 8th Baron. (He should be more properly listed as the 1st Baron Wharton, of the new barony.) At his death, the title was inherited successively by his son and thereafter by his daughter, Elisabeth, who became the 10th Baroness. At her death in 1974, the Barony again fell into abeyance, between her two daughters. It was once again revived in 1990, when the abeyance was terminated in favour of Myrtle Robertson. At her death, the Barony was inherited by her son Myles.

== Barons Wharton (1544) ==
- Sir Thomas Wharton, 1st Baron Wharton (c. 1495–1568)
- Thomas Wharton, 2nd Baron Wharton (1520–1572)
- Philip Wharton, 3rd Baron Wharton (1555–1625)
- Philip Wharton, 4th Baron Wharton (1613–1696)
- Thomas Wharton, 5th Baron Wharton (1648–1715, created Earl of Wharton in 1706 and Marquess of Wharton in 1715)

== Marquesses of Wharton (1715) ==
- Thomas Wharton, 1st Marquess of Wharton (1648–1715)
- Philip Wharton, 2nd Marquess of Wharton (1698–1731) (abeyant 1731) (created Duke of Wharton in 1718)

== Dukes of Wharton (1718) ==
- Philip Wharton, 1st Duke of Wharton (1698–1731) (forfeit 1729 (forfeiture retroactively reversed 1825), all except Barony extinct on his death, Barony abeyant on his death)

== Barons Wharton (1544; continued) ==
- Jane Wharton, 7th Baroness Wharton (1706–1761) (became sole heir 1739; abeyant on her death)
- Charles Theodore Halswell Kemeys-Tynte, 8th Baron Wharton (1876–1934) (abeyance terminated 1916)
- Charles John Halswell Kemeys-Tynte, 9th Baron Wharton (1908–1969)
- Elisabeth Dorothy Kemeys-Tynte, 10th Baroness Wharton (1906–1974) (abeyant on her death)
- Myrtle Olive Felix Robertson, 11th Baroness Wharton (1934–2000) (abeyance terminated 1990)
- Myles Christopher David Robertson, 12th Baron Wharton (b. 1964)

The heir presumptive is the present holder's only child, the Hon. Meghan Ziky Mary Robertson (b. 2006).

== Early Whartons ==
The Wharton landholding gentry status dates from 6 October 1292, when King Edward I granted to Gilbert de Querton "the Manor of Querton with its appurtenances". (Note: "Querton" was the earlier Latin spelling of "Wharton".) There de Querton built Lammerside for himself and his wife, Emma de Hastings. The remains of the building still stand and today resemble a pele tower. Emma was the daughter of Nicholas de Hastings of the family which were the ancestors of the present Earls of Huntingdon and of Pembroke.

The descendants of Sir Gilbert were:

- Sir Henry de Querton (c. 1281–after 1343)
- Sir Hugh de Querton (c. 1308–before 1389)
- Sir William de Wherton (c. 1327–before 1417)
- Sir John de Wharton (c. 1360–1434)
- Sir Thomas de Wherton (c. 1388 – c. 1440)
- Sir Henry Wharton (c. 1437–?)
- Sir Thomas Wharton II (1460 or 1465–1531)
- Sir Thomas Wharton, 1st Baron Wharton (c. 1495–1568)

== Family tree ==
Family tree of the Barons Wharton, Marquesses of Wharton, and Duke of Wharton

Thomas Wharton of Wharton
Baron Wharton, 1544
Thomas Wharton; 1495–1568; 1st Baron Wharton	Christopher Wharton a. 1546–1600
Thomas Wharton; 1520–1572; 2nd Baron Wharton
Philip Wharton; 1555–1625; 3rd Baron Wharton
Thomas Wharton c. 1588 – 1622	Philadelphia Carey d. 1654
Philip Wharton; 1613–1696; 4th Baron Wharton	Thomas Wharton c. 1615 – 1684
Marquess of Catherlough, Earl of Rathfarnham, and Baron Trim (Ireland), 1715; Marquess of Wharton and Marquess of Malmesbury (Great Britain), 1715
Anne Lee; 1659–1685	Thomas Wharton; 1648–1715; 1st Marquess of Catherlough, Malmesbury, and Wharton, etc., 5th Baron Wharton	Lucy Loftus	Mary Wharton; 1649–1699	Charles Kemeys d. 1702; 3rd Baronet of Kevanmabley
Duke of Northumberland, Marquess of Woburn, Earl of Malmesbury and Viscount Winchendon (all in the Jacobite peerage), 1715; Duke of Wharton, 1718
Philip Wharton; 1698–1731; 1st Duke of Wharton, 1st Duke of Northumberland, etc., 2nd Marquess of Catherlough, Malmesbury, and Wharton, etc., 6th Baron Wharton	Lucy (Wharton) Morice d. 1739	Jane (née Wharton) Holt, then Coke; 1706–1761; 7th Baroness Wharton, de facto	Charles Kemeys, 1688–1735; 4th Baronet of Kevanmabley	Jane Kemeys d. c. 1747	John Tynte d. 1709/10; 2nd Baronet
Dukedom of Wharton, etc. forfeit and barony Wharton abeyant, 1729, dukedom of Northumberland extinct, 1731	Barony Wharton abeyant, 1761
Jane Tynte d. 1741
Jane Hassell d. 1825
Charles John Kemeys-Tynte; 1778–1860
Charles John Kemeys-Tynte; 1800–1882
Charles John Kemeys-Tynte; 1822–1891
Halswell Milborne Kemeys-Tynte; 1852–1899
Baron Wharton abeyance terminated (or regranted), 1916
Charles Kemeys-Tynte; 1876–1934; 8th Baron Wharton
Elisabeth Dorothy Kemys-Tynte; 1906–1974; 10th Baroness Wharton	Charles John Halswell Kemeys-Tynte; 1908–1969; 9th Baron Wharton
Barony Wharton abeyant, 1974
Barony Wharton abeyance terminated, 1990
Myrtle Olive Felix "Ziki" Robertson; 1934–2000; 11th Baron Wharton
Myles Christopher David Robertson b. 1964; 12th Baron Wharton
Meghan Ziky Mary Robertson b. 2006
Heir presumptive to the barony Wharton
