= Sebastian Goode =

Sebastian Goode (born c. 1599) was an English politician who sat in the House of Commons in 1625.

Goode was the son of John Goode of Malden, Surrey. He matriculated at Christ Church, Oxford on 19 May 1615, aged 16. He was a student of Lincoln's Inn in 1618. In 1625, he was elected Member of Parliament for Tregoney.

Parliament of England
Preceded by Peter Specott; Ambrose Manaton	Member of Parliament for Tregoney; 1625; With: Sir Henry Carey	Succeeded by Thomas Carey; Sir Robert Kelligrew
