= Ziki Robertson, 11th Baroness Wharton =

English baroness and photographer (1934–2000)

The Right Honourable The Baroness Wharton

Member of the House of Lords
- Lord Temporal
- Hereditary peer 4 April 1990 – 11 November 1999
- Preceded by: The 10th Baroness Wharton
- Succeeded by: Seat abolished
- Elected Hereditary Peer; 11 November 1999 – 15 May 2000
- Election: 1999
- Preceded by: Seat established
- Succeeded by: The 2nd Baron Cobbold

Personal details
- Born: 20 February 1934
- Died: 15 May 2000 (aged 66)
- Spouse: Doug Robinson

Myrtle Olive Felix Robertson, 11th Baroness Wharton (née Arbuthnot; 20 February 1934 – 15 May 2000), known as Ziki Robertson and professionally as Ziki Arnot, was a British politician, animal welfare campaigner and photographer.

== Biography ==
Wharton was the daughter of David George Arbuthnot and Elisabeth, née Kemeys-Tynte, 10th Baroness Wharton. She was brought up in South Africa and was educated at the Herschel school for girls in Clarement, Cape Province. She was an advocate of animal welfare and became a vice-president of the RSPCA in 1997.

When her mother died in 1974, the Barony went into abeyance. This was terminated in 1990, and Ziki Robertson became 11th Baroness Wharton. She was one of the 92 hereditary peers who were elected under the House of Lords Act 1999 to continue as members of the Lords when most of the hereditary peers lost their seats.

She married Henry MacLeod Robertson and had four children including Myles Christopher David Robertson, 12th Baron Wharton. She died of sporadic Creutzfeldt–Jakob disease on 15 May 2000, aged 66.

Peerage of England
Preceded by Elisabeth Vintcent	Baroness Wharton; 1990–2000; Member of the House of Lords (1990–1999)	Succeeded by Myles Robertson
Parliament of the United Kingdom
New office created by the House of Lords Act 1999	Elected hereditary peer to the House of Lords under the House of Lords Act 1999; 1999–2000	Succeeded by The Lord Cobbold
