= Philip Wharton, 1st Duke of Wharton =

British Duke (1698–1731)

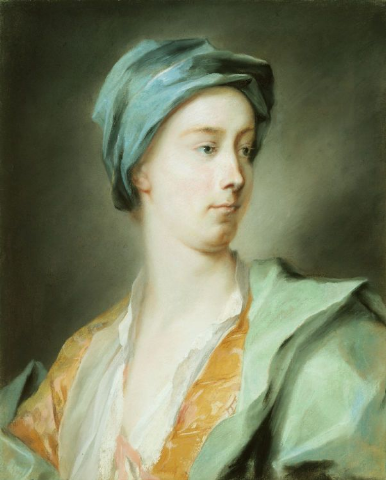
A portrait of the Duke of Wharton by Rosalba Carriera c. 1718

Philip Wharton, 1st Duke of Wharton PC (21 December 1698 – 31 May 1731) was an English peer and Jacobite politician who was one of the few people in the history of England, and the first since the 15th century, to have been raised to a dukedom whilst still a minor and not closely related to the monarch.

== Youth and marriage ==
Wharton was the son of "Honest Tom" Wharton, 1st Marquess of Wharton, the Whig partisan, and his second wife, Lucy Loftus, and had a good education. Well prepared for a life as a public speaker, the young Wharton was both eloquent and witty, but spoiled and prone to excess. When his father died in 1715, Philip, then sixteen years old, succeeded him as 2nd Marquess of Wharton and 2nd Marquess of Malmesbury in the Peerage of Great Britain and as 2nd Marquess of Catherlough in the Peerage of Ireland. Wharton did not get control of his father's extensive estate, as it had been put in the care of his mother and his father's Whig friends until he reached the age of 21.

In 1715, one month after inheriting these peerages, he eloped with 15-year-old Martha Holmes, the daughter of Major-General Richard Holmes, who lacked any noble pedigree. Thereafter, young Wharton began to travel, leaving his wife behind in England. He travelled to France and Switzerland chaperoned by a severe Calvinist tutor whose authority he resented. He met James Francis Edward Stuart, the "Old Pretender" and son of King James II and VII, sometimes known in Europe as the rightful James III and VIII, or as James, Prince of Wales, who in 1716 created him Duke of Northumberland in the Jacobite peerage.

Wharton then went to Ireland where, at the age of 18, he entered the Irish House of Lords as Marquess of Catherlough. When he was 19 years old, in 1718, he was created Duke of Wharton in the Peerage of Great Britain by King George I, part of an effort to solidify his support in the British House of Lords.

Upon returning to England from Ireland in 1718, he was reunited with Martha, now styled as the Duchess of Wharton. According to a letter written around this time by Lady Mary Wortley Montagu to her sister Lady Mary, the young Duke was pompous and unfaithful, and used his wife to make his mistresses jealous:

"The Duke of Wharton has brought his Duchess to town, and is fond of her to distraction; in order to break the hearts of all other women that have any claim upon him... he has public devotions twice a day and assists at them in person with exemplary devotion; and there is nothing pleasanter than the remarks of some pious ladies on the conversion of such a sinner."

On 7 or 11 March 1719, the Duchess of Wharton gave birth to a son and heir, Thomas, Marquess of Malmesbury. George I was sponsor at his baptism. Fatherhood appeared to have matured Wharton as he attempted to live a more respectable lifestyle as a husband.

However, the following year, Thomas died in a smallpox epidemic in London. Wharton blamed his wife, whom he had told to stay with the baby at their estate at Winchendon, Buckinghamshire. According to author Lewis Melville:

[The Duchess], whether irked by the dulness of the country, or desirous to be with her husband, or, what is still more probable, thinking by her presence to guard him against those temptations to which he was all too prone to yield, followed him to London. There, unfortunately, the child sickened of the epidemic, and died on March 1, 1720.... The Duke, terribly enraged, vowed he would never see or speak again to her who was responsible for the death of his heir.

Though they remained married, he never lived again with his wife (who died in 1726) and "followed his natural leanings and plunged into excesses of all kinds". He was a "boon companion" with the notorious Francis Charteris, dubbed the "Rape-Master General". Wharton is credited with founding the original Hellfire Club, made up of high-society rakes celebrating debauchery, and primarily performed parodies of religious rites, "which damned him in the eyes of all sober-minded persons."

== Political life ==
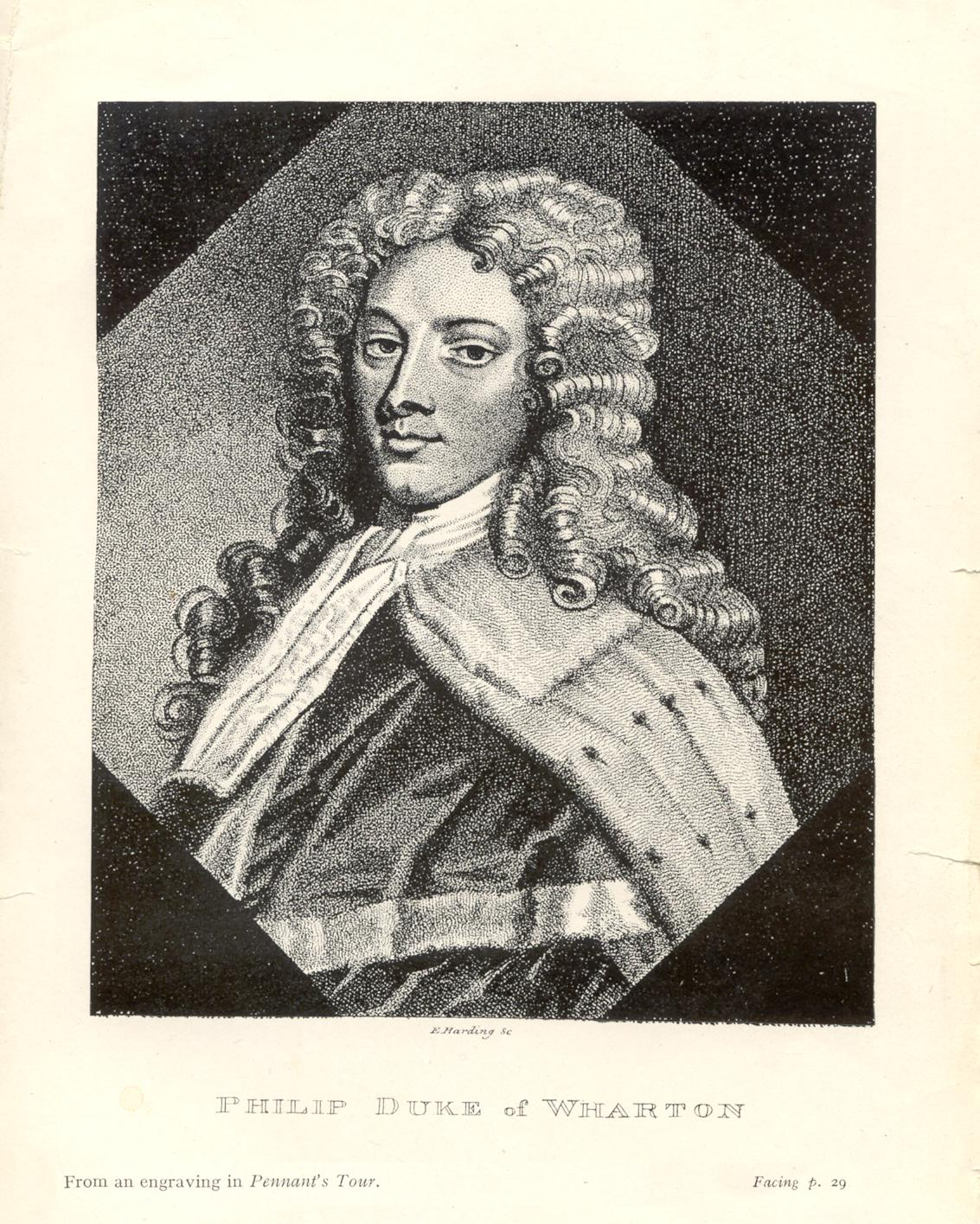
The Duke of Wharton.

Wharton turned Jacobite when travelling in 1716, or at least nominally Jacobite. He began signing his name "Philip James Wharton" to indicate his allegiance. Because he was a powerful speaker, an elegant writer, a wealthy (initially) peer, and a man with a seat in the House of Lords, the new Hanoverians always sought to gain him as an ally, while the old Jacobites were, at least initially, zealous to keep him on their side.

Even before his losses in the South Sea Bubble stock market crash of 1720, Wharton incurred heavy debts. He was so indebted that he sold his Irish estates and used that money to invest in South Sea Company stock. When the bubble burst, he lost the staggering sum of £120,000 (US$26,200,000 | 2020) (in an era when a middle-class salary in London might be £200 a year). In response, he hired musicians and a hearse and held a public funeral for the South Sea Company.

Wharton began to borrow money from Jacobite bankers and accumulated more debts. He became Grand Master of the Premier Grand Lodge of England in 1723, and was active in the House of Lords in opposition to Robert Walpole. In 1723, he wrote and spoke in favour of the exoneration of Francis Atterbury, the accused Jacobite bishop, although Atterbury's Jacobitism was superficial. He published The True Briton as a periodical to oppose the rise of Walpole. He was in favour of the Pretender not for religious or nationalist reasons but, he explained, because he was a true Old Whig like his father, whose principles had been betrayed by Walpole and the new non-native royals.

His substantive change to Jacobitism occurred in 1725, when Wharton joined Earl Orrery in attacking the court. He made allies among city politicians, which was valuable to the Jacobites as Jacobitism had previously been associated with Scotland and disaffected country squires. The city had been a Whig stronghold and any erosion in their support would have powerful consequences. Indeed, although Wharton did not benefit from it, much of this would bear fruit in the emergence of the Patriot Whigs a few years later. At the same time, Wharton was £70,000 in debt (equivalent to £12,470,000 in 2025)

== Debt and decline ==
Wharton's debts were impossible for him to overcome. He accepted or sought the position as Jacobite ambassador to the Holy Roman Empire in Vienna in 1725, but the Austrians did not like Wharton, whom they did not consider a satisfactory diplomat. His dissipated lifestyle also offended the more severe Austrians. He then went to Rome, where James gave him the Order of the Garter, which Wharton wore publicly. He moved on to Madrid. Wharton's wife died in 1726, and he married Maria Theresa O'Neill O'Beirne, a Maid of Honour to the Queen, only three months later. She was the daughter of Colonel Henry O'Beirne, an Irish officer in the service of Spain, and his wife Henrietta O'Neill. Walpole's spies were informed of Wharton's activities and other Jacobites considered him a dangerous person to be near. Additionally, his behaviour was growing more offensive, mainly with drunkenness, but also with inappropriate actions. At the reception for his wedding, he exposed himself to the wedding party (and bride) to show her "what she was to have that night in her Gutts" (cited in Smith). Even Francis Atterbury condemned him.

In 1728, Wharton began to help Nathaniel Mist with Mist's Weekly Journal. He wrote the infamous "Persian Letter" that caused the Walpole ministry to respond violently with arrests and the destruction of the presses. The power of Wharton's name and eloquence was such that Walpole offered Wharton a pardon and forgiveness of his debts if he were to agree to leave off writing. He also wrote, that year, a powerful piece against the "corruption" of Whig causes under Walpole entitled, "Reasons for Leaving his Native Country". Edward Young modelled "Lorenzo" in Night Thoughts on Wharton. Alexander Pope referred to Wharton as "the scorn and wonder of our days" – a man "Too rash for thought, for action too refined" (Epistle to Sir Richard Temple).

Wharton was soon stealing food from acquaintances and seeking money anywhere he could get it. He sold his title back to George I and took a position as a lieutenant colonel in the Jacobite forces in the Spanish army fighting England. He took up arms, therefore, against his native country, and this warranted a charge of treason in 1729. In the siege at Gibraltar in 1727, Wharton sought to prove that he was not a coward, and so he charged at the head of his men and was wounded in the foot.

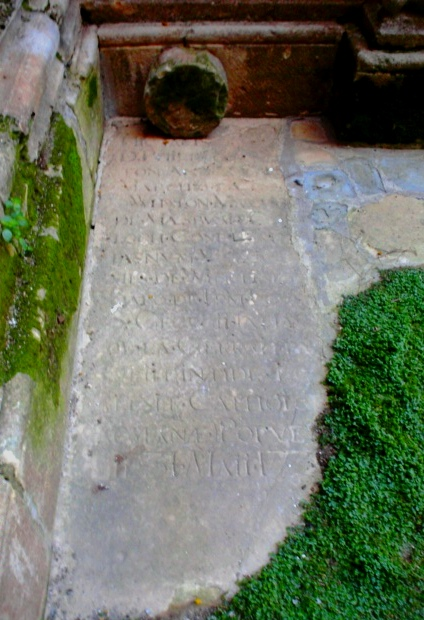
Tomb of the Duke of Wharton in Poblet, Spain

Before the treason charge, Wharton fitfully attempted a reconciliation with George. He offered to give Walpole's spies intelligence, but they rejected him as of little value, and he returned to Madrid to live on his army pay alone. When he was insulted by a valet, he caned him and was imprisoned briefly before being banished.

== Death and succession ==
In 1730, he renounced James and the Jacobite cause. In advanced stages of alcoholism, he and his wife moved to the Royal Cistercian Abbey of Poblet, in Catalonia, where he died on 1 June 1731. His widow returned to London, with the aid of James. When Wharton's will was proved in court in 1736, she was able to live comfortably in society in London. Wharton's titles became extinct on his death, other than Baron Wharton which was inherited by his sister Jane Wharton, 7th Baroness Wharton. In 1738 his valuable mining interests centred on Fremington in Yorkshire were sold, having many years earlier been placed in trust, with the mines of lead, iron and copper reserved for the use of his two sisters, Lady Jane Wharton (1707–1761) (wife of Robert Coke of Longford in Derbyshire, brother of Thomas Coke, 1st Earl of Leicester) and Lady Lucy Wharton (d.1739) (wife of Sir William Morice, Baronet, of Werrington in Devon). Lady Jane survived her sister and on her death in 1760 bequeathed the mines in trust to a certain "Miss Anna Maria Draycott" (c.1736–1787), who was referred to as her "niece", possibly a sobriquet, "whom she had brought up" (i.e. from childhood), according to Clarkson (1814). The identity of Anna Maria is uncertain, she is called Anna Maria Delagard, "sister of William Delagard of Bombay", and "grand-daughter and heiress of William Draycott of Chelsea, county Middlesex" "and of Sunbury Court in Middlesex". She later adopted the surname Draycott, having also inherited the Sunbury-on-Thames estates of the Draycott family, and in 1764 married George Fermor, 2nd Earl of Pomfret, who thereby inherited her large fortune and the Wharton mining interests. Her gratitude to Lady Jane her benefactor is recorded on an inscribed monument she erected to her in St Mary's Church, Sunbury, where she was buried, but with no stated indication of the relationship.

== See also ==
- Gormogons

== Bibliography ==
- Smith, Lawrence B. "Philip James Wharton, Duke of Wharton and Jacobite Duke of Northumberland." In Matthew, H.C.G. and Brian Harrison, eds. The Oxford Dictionary of National Biography. vol. 58, pp. 367–70. London: Oxford University Press, 2004.

Masonic offices
Preceded by The Duke of Montagu	Grand Master of the Premier; Grand Lodge of England; 1723	Succeeded by The Duke of Buccleuch
Peerage of Great Britain
New creation	Duke of Wharton; 1718–1729	Forfeit
Preceded by Thomas Wharton	Marquess of Wharton; Marquess of Malmesbury; 1715–1729	Forfeit
Peerage of Ireland
Preceded by Thomas Wharton	Marquess of Catherlough; 1715–1729	Forfeit
Peerage of England
New creation	— TITULAR — Duke of Northumberland; Jacobite peerage 1716–1731	Extinct
Preceded by Thomas Wharton	Baron Wharton; 1715–1729	Abeyant
