= Robert Carey, 1st Earl of Monmouth =

English nobleman and courtier (1526–1596)

The Right Honourable The Earl of Monmouth
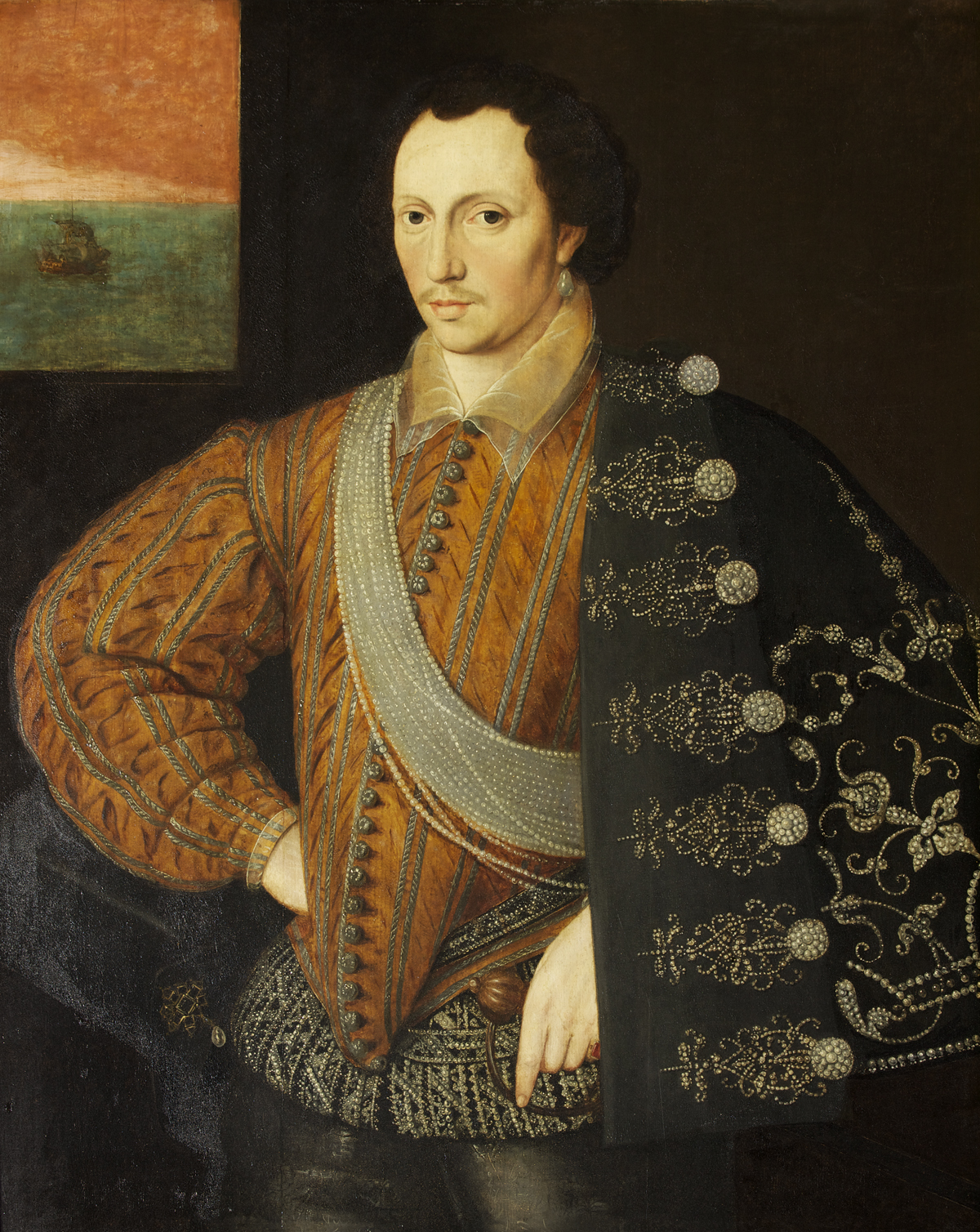
- Robert Carey, 1st Earl of Monmouth, c. 1591

Personal details
- Born: c. 1560
- Died: 12 April 1639 (aged 78–79)
- Spouse: Elizabeth Trevannion
- Children: Henry Carey, 2nd Earl of Monmouth; Thomas Carey; Philadelphia Carey
- Parent(s): Henry Carey, 1st Baron Hunsdon; Anne Morgan

Robert Carey, 1st Earl of Monmouth (c. 1560 – 12 April 1639) (or 'Cary') was an English nobleman and courtier. He was the youngest son of Henry Carey, 1st Baron Hunsdon, chamberlain and first cousin of Queen Elizabeth I, and his wife Anne Morgan, daughter of Sir Thomas Morgan and Anne Whitney.

== Biography ==
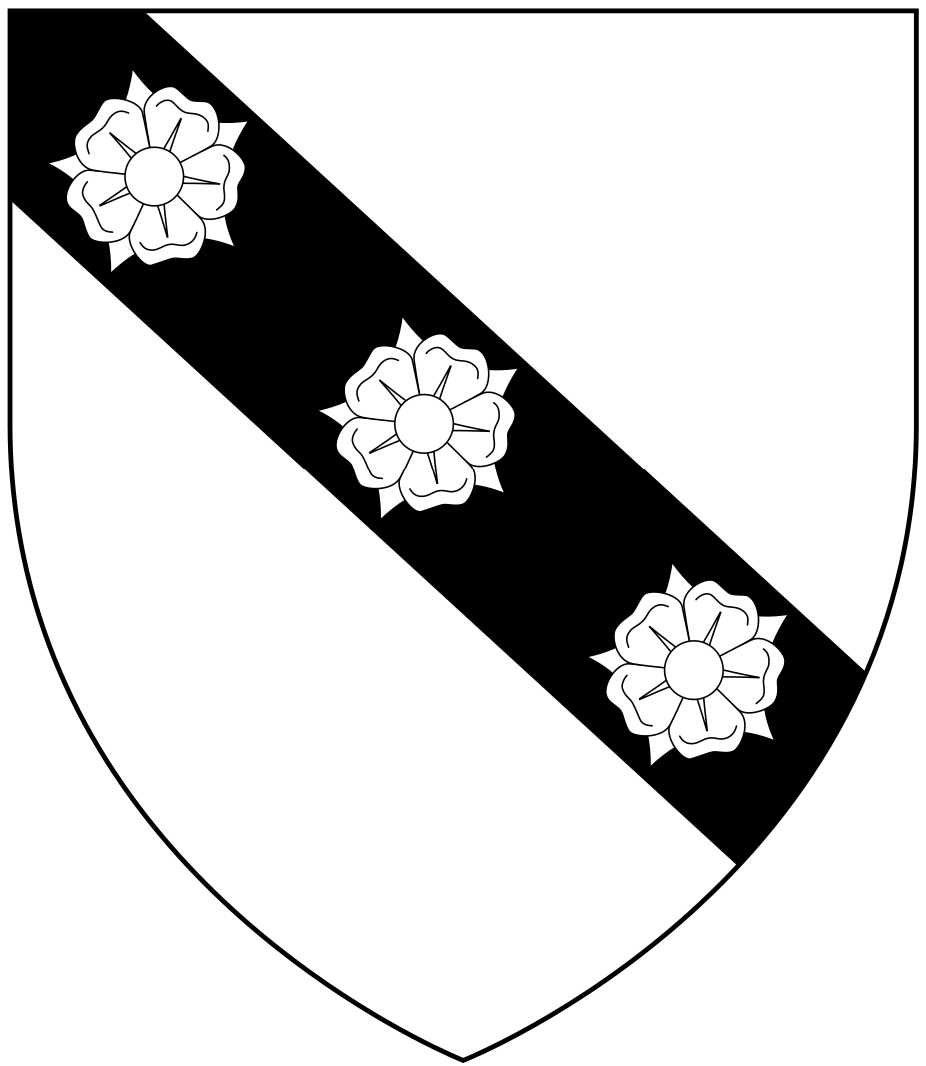
Arms of Cary: Argent, on a bend sable three roses of the field

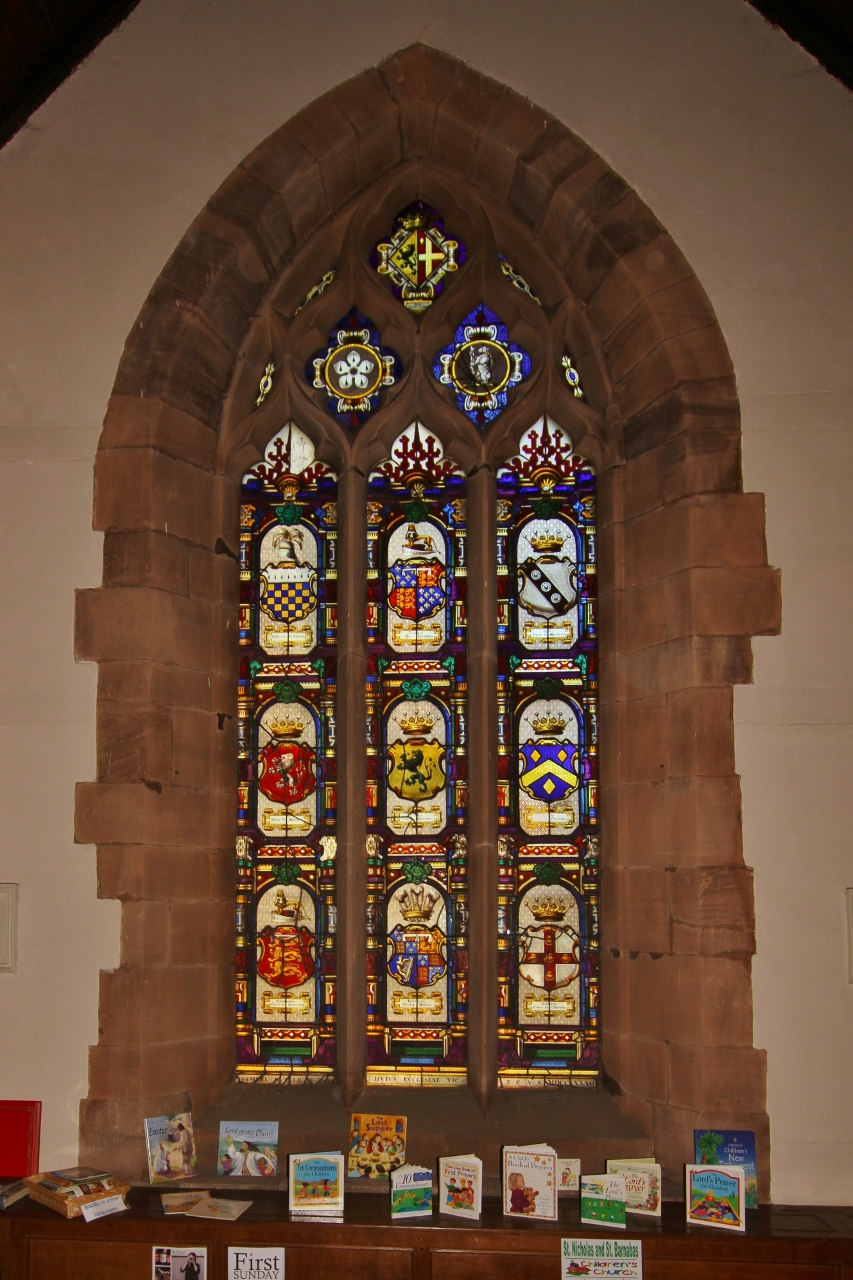
Arms of Robert Carey, 1st Earl of Monmouth, (top of right column), in a 19th-century (?) stained glass window in the Church of St Nicholas, Kenilworth, Warwickshire, showing the arms of the historical holders of Kenilworth Castle

As a young man he accompanied several diplomatic missions abroad and took part in military expeditions. He was sent to Scotland in February 1587 with certain news of the execution of Mary, Queen of Scots. He was met at Berwick-upon-Tweed by the Scottish diplomat George Young. According to David Moysie, Young withheld his passport and carried his news to James VI of Scotland.

In 1587, Carey joined in the attempt to relieve Sluys. In 1588 he served as a volunteer against the Spanish Armada; so disappointed was he to be left behind by Drake and Norris the following year that he walked from London to Berwick in twelve days, winning a wager worth two thousand pounds. Carey commanded a regiment in the Earl of Essex's expedition to Normandy in support of the Protestant Henry IV of France in 1591, taking part in the siege of Rouen. He was knighted by Essex the same year for having by his intercession with the Queen procured his recall.

In October 1593 he brought the Scottish rebel Francis Stewart, 5th Earl of Bothwell, as a guest to Carlisle Castle. This alarmed his brother-in-law, Thomas Scrope, who was Warden of the West March, because Elizabeth I had declared her nobles would not receive the earl.

In the parliaments of 1586 and 1588 he represented Morpeth; in that of 1593, Callington; and in those of 1596 and 1601, Northumberland. From 1592 till the end of Elizabeth's reign he occupied various posts in the government of the Scottish borders. In 1596, he was appointed Warden of the Middle March, which he held till February 1598. He was also Captain of Norham Castle.

This was some of the most important work of his life, and he was largely responsible for easing the troubles and the depredations of the Border Reivers. His conflict with the Scottish fyrebrande Robert Ker, 1st Earl of Roxburghe was only settled after great skill and tact on Carey's part.

In March 1603 he visited the court, and witnessed Queen Elizabeth I's last illness, which he described in his memoirs. Anxious to recommend himself to her successor James I, and disobeying the orders of the council, he started on horseback immediately after the Queen's death on the morning of 24 March 1603, in order to be the first to communicate the tidings to James. He arrived at Holyrood late on 26 March. The next day, King James confirmed in a letter to Robert Cecil that Carey had been first with the news. Carey was appointed a Gentleman of the Bedchamber, but his conduct met with general disapproval and merited censure as "contrary to all decency, good manners and respect," and on James's arrival in England he was dismissed from his new post.

Carey went into Scotland again to transact business with Sir George Home over the ownership of Norham. He went to Dunfermline Palace and was the guest of Alexander Seton who was the guardian of Prince Charles. Charles had stayed behind in Scotland, partly because he was sickly, and Carey wrote that he was "a very weak child". Prince Charles came south in September 1604 and the king sent Carey to meet him at Bishop Auckland.

On 23 February 1605, he was made governor of Prince Charles. Carey's wife, Elizabeth Trevanion (not Aletta Hogenhove, who was the wife of his nephew Sir Robert Carey), a lady in waiting to Anne of Denmark, was responsible for the early training of the weak, stammering Charles. She taught the Prince, a late-developer, to walk and talk at the age of three, and was close to him throughout his life. Upon her husband's accession to the peerage, she became known as Dame Robert Carey, and is said to be the "Old Dame Dob" referred to in the Jack and Jill nursery rhyme, for her ministrations to the "bruised" King Charles I after his plan to raise revenue by lowering the volume of liquid in the jack (1/2 pint) and gill (1/4 pint) was foiled by publicans by simply making up the difference (up to the 1/2 pint line that is marked by a crown on pint glasses) with water.

In 1611, he was made the Master of the Robes to the Prince, in 1617 his Chamberlain, and on 6 February 1622, he was created Baron Carey of Leppington. In 1623 he followed Charles in his visit to Philip IV of Spain with a parcel of jewels. Following Charles' succession to the throne he was created Earl of Monmouth in 1626. In 1621 he sat in Parliament for the last time as MP for Grampound.

He died on 12 April 1639. His eldest son by Elizabeth Trevannion, Henry Carey, 2nd Earl of Monmouth (1596–1661) succeeded him, and on his death without surviving male issue the peerage became extinct.

His Memoirs were published first by John Boyle, 5th Earl of Cork in 1759. A second edition, annotated by Sir Walter Scott, was printed in 1808.

A new edition was published in 2005, ISBN 1-904466-29-X. The Stirring World of Robert Carey: Robert Carey's Memoirs 1577-1625.

== Family and issue ==
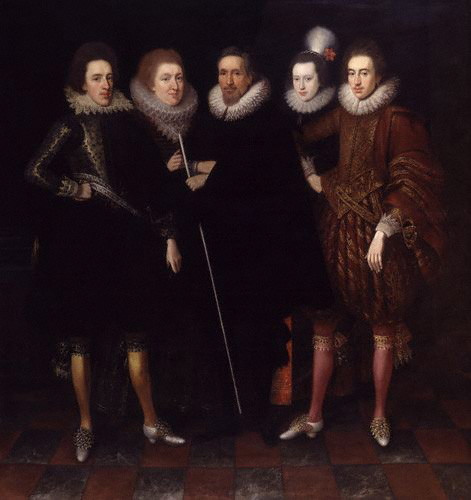
The 1st Earl of Monmouth (centre), with his wife Elizabeth and their children Henry (left), Philadelphia, and Thomas.

Robert Carey married Elizabeth Trevannion, the daughter of Sir Hugh Trevannion and Sybilla Morgan, on 20 Aug 1593. They were first cousins, with Robert's mother Anne, being the elder sister of Sybilla. They had three children:

- Henry Carey, 2nd Earl of Monmouth (1596–1661)
- Thomas Carey (1598–1634). Thomas married Margaret Smith, daughter of Thomas Smith.
- Lady Philadelphia Carey (died in c. 1654/5), married to Sir Thomas Wharton. She was the mother of the 4th Baron Wharton.

== Historical fiction ==
Patricia Finney, writing as P. F. Chisholm, has written a series of historical mysteries featuring Sir Robert Carey, set during his time as Deputy Lord Warden of the Marches.

An elderly Robert Carey, supposedly speaking in 1626, narrates portions of George Garrett's The Succession: A Novel of Elizabeth and James (1983).

== Notes ==
Political offices
Preceded by The Lord Eure	Custos Rotulorum of Northumberland; 1598–bef. 1605	Succeeded by Lord Edward Talbot
Preceded by The Earl of Essex	Lord Lieutenant of Staffordshire; 1627–1629	Succeeded by The Earl of Essex
Parliament of England
Preceded by Thomas St Aubyn; Francis Barnham	Member of Parliament for Grampound; 1621–1624; With: John Hampden	Succeeded by John Mohun; Richard Edgcumbe
Peerage of England
New creation	Earl of Monmouth; First creation 1626–1639	Succeeded by Henry Carey
New creation	Baron Carey of Leppington; 1622–1639	Succeeded by Henry Carey
