= Philadelphia Carey =

English courtier

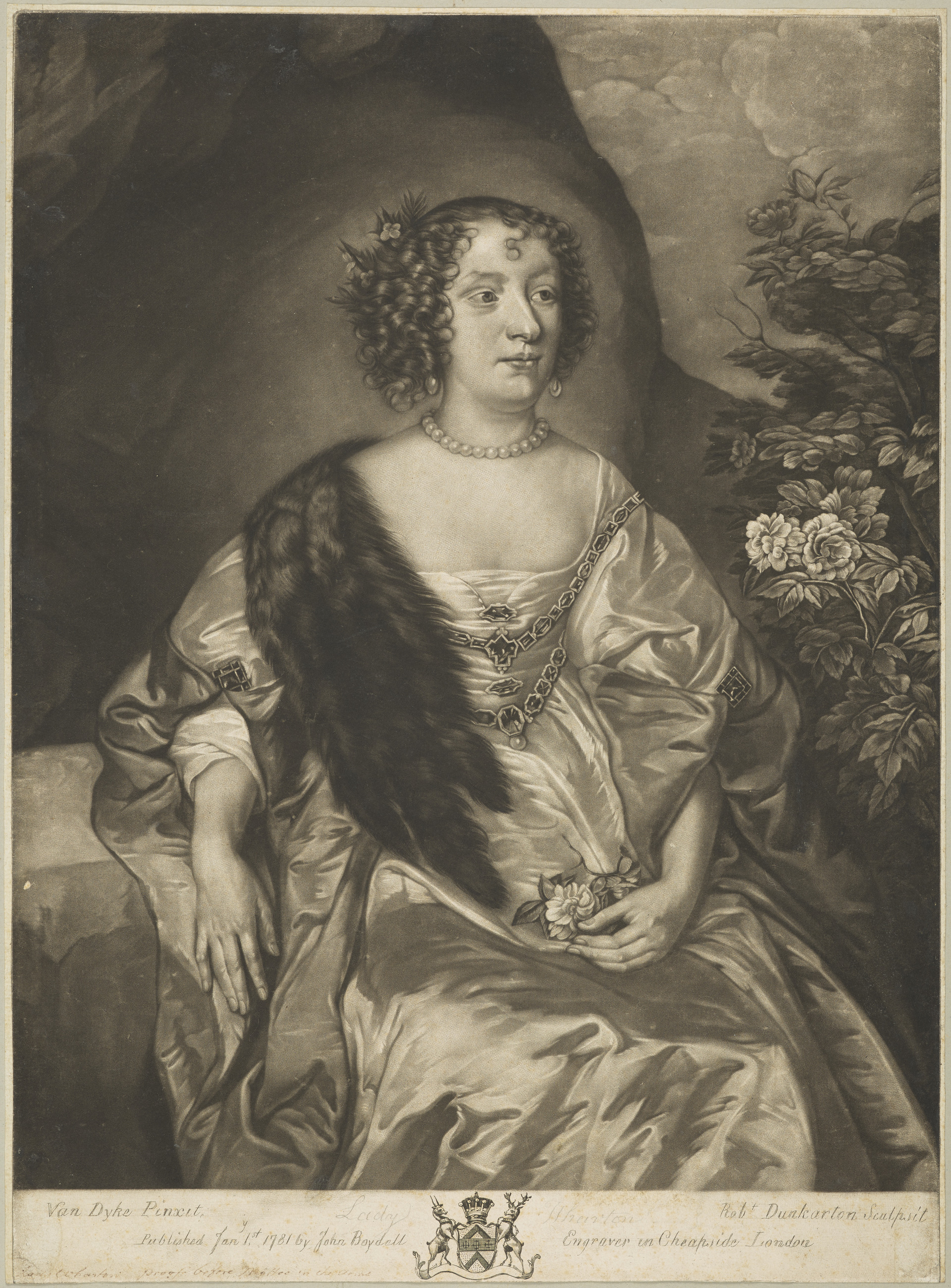
Philadelphia Carey, after Anthony van Dyck

Lady Philadelphia Carey (died 1654) was an English courtier.

Philadelphia Carey was a daughter of Robert Carey, 1st Earl of Monmouth and Elizabeth Trevannion.

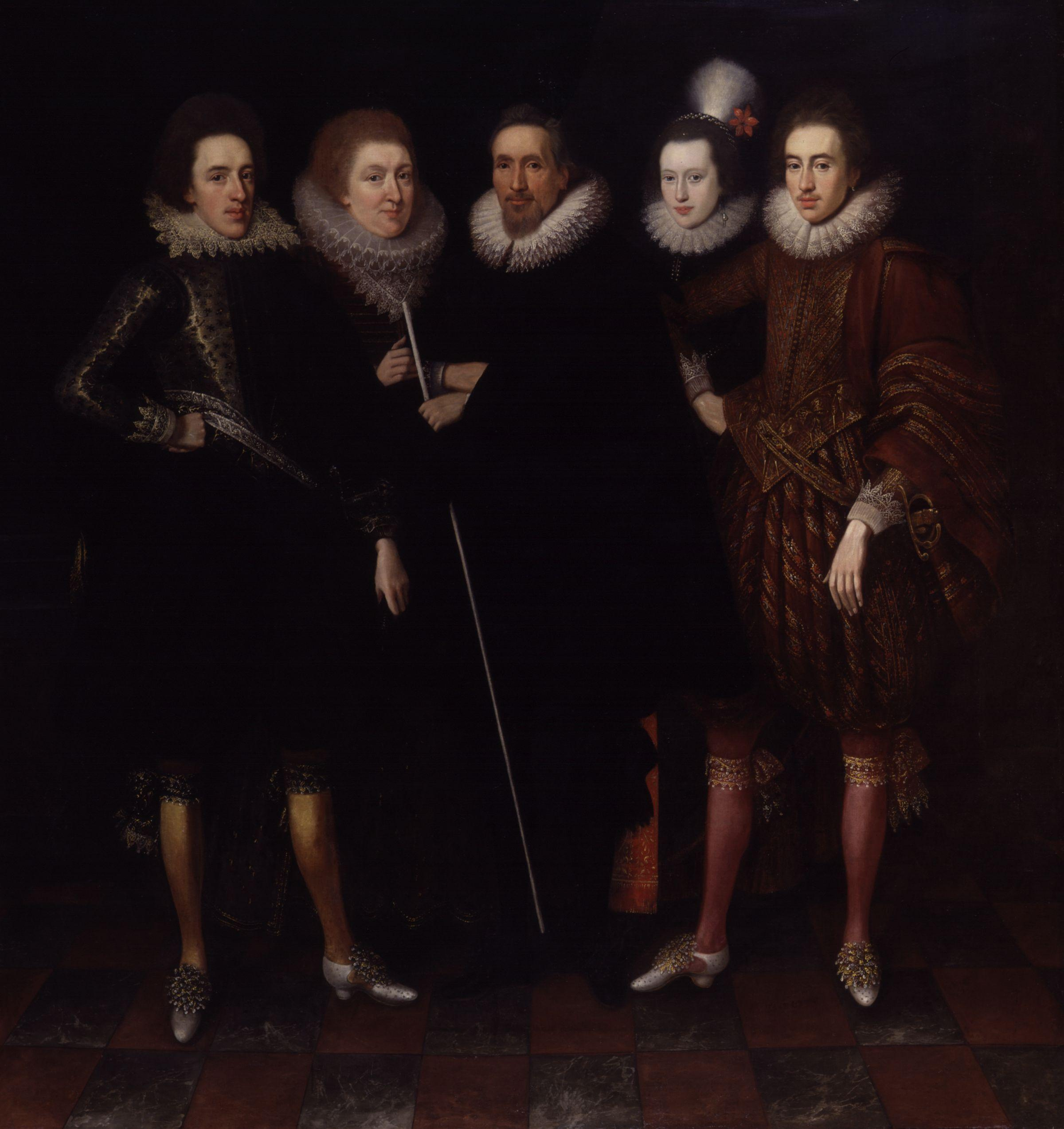
Philadelphia Carey and her family, attributed to Paul van Somer

== Namesake aunt ==
She was the niece of another "Philadelphia Carey" (1552–1627), who was a daughter of Henry Carey, 1st Baron Hunsdon and Ann Morgan. She married Thomas Scrope, 10th Baron Scrope of Bolton in 1584 and was a lady-in-waiting to Queen Elizabeth. On the queen's death she passed her ring to her brother Robert Carey, who rode to Scotland to give it to James VI.

== Career ==
The younger Philadelphia Carey was a lady-in-waiting to Princess Elizabeth.

Her portrait appears in a picture of the family of the Earl of Monmouth in 1617 attributed to Paul van Somer and she was also painted by Anthony van Dyck. A version of the Van Dyck portrait, in different costume from the mezzotint, had the inscription "about the age of 44".

King James stayed with her at Aske on 16 April 1617 on his way to Scotland, and at Wharton Hall on 8 August on his return.

In June 1623 she travelled to The Hague to see Elizabeth Stuart, Queen of Bohemia, with Elizabeth, Lady Knollys, Isabella Smythe, Lady Hatton and her daughter Lady Purbeck. They sent a comic letter to Dudley Carleton, in the spirit of a masque, explaining their arrival deposited on the shore by Neptune, in hope of an introduction to the King and Queen of Bohemia.

She died in 1654 and was buried at Easby, Richmondshire.

== Marriage and children ==
She married Sir Thomas Wharton of Aske Hall (d. 1622) in April 1611. George Calvert noted the financial settlement of £6000 from her father and an annual £1200 jointure.

They had two sons:

- Philip Wharton, 4th Baron Wharton (1613 - 1696). He married two times, with issue.
- Thomas Wharton (1615 - 1684). He married two times, with issue.
