= Thomas Wharton (children's writer) =

American writer

Thomas Wharton is an American artist, musician, children's book author, app producer, designer and communications specialist. He is co-founder and co-owner of Adventure House Communications Group and One Hundred Robots.

== Biography ==
Born in Wheeling, West Virginia, Thomas Wharton received a master's degree in music at the University of West Virginia before moving to New York City. He then studied art and design at The Art Student's League, the School of Visual Arts, the New York Studio School, and Parsons. His paintings have won The Georgie Read Barton Award from the Hudson Valley Art Association, The Katlin Seascape Award and the Windsor Newton Award from the Salmagundi Club.

Thomas Wharton co-founded Adventure House Communications Group with business partner Robert Lowe in 1990. Adventure House has partnered with Cambridge University Press to design educational books for fifteen years. Adventure House has also completed design and branding projects for New York Stock Exchange, MasterCard, McGraw-Hill, Clarins, Lifetime Television, Citigroup, The Girl Scouts, and Simon & Schuster.

In 1991, Thomas Wharton wrote and illustrated the children's book Hildegard Sings about an opera singing hippo who aspires to be an opera star. Publishers Weekly describes the book as a "lighthearted and triumphant tale" while Kirkus sees it as "an excellent way to introduce kids to the opera."

Thomas Wharton and Robert Lowe then established One Hundred Robots, an iOS application development and publishing company. Their first iOS application, The Night Before Christmas, was released in December 2010. Their next release, Cinderella - A Princess Story was in April 2011. Hildegard Sings, an adaptation of the original book, which was released as an app for iPhone, iPad, and iPod Touch on June 23, 2011.
