= John Kemeys-Tynte, 9th Baron Wharton =

British aristocrat

The Right Honourable The Lord Wharton
- Born: Charles John Halswell Kemeys-Tynte; 12 January 1908
- Died: 22 July 1969 (aged 61)
- Education: Christ Church, Oxford
- Spouse: Joanna Law-Smith (m. 1967)
- Father: Charles Kemeys-Tynte
- Relatives: Elisabeth Vintcent (sister)
- Military career
- Allegiance: United Kingdom
- Branch: Royal Air Force
- Service years: 1939-1945
- Rank: Flight Lieutenant
- Unit: Royal Air Force Volunteer Reserve
- Conflicts: World War II

Charles John Halswell Kemeys-Tynte, 9th Baron Wharton (12 January 1908 - 22 July 1969) was a British aristocrat. He was the son of Charles Theodore Halswell Kemeys-Tynte, 8th Baron Wharton.

He was educated at Christ Church, Oxford, he then served in World War II from 1939 to 45 as Flight Lieutenant of the Royal Air Force Volunteer Reserve. He married Joanna Morgan (née Russell; born, Law-Smith), widow of John Morgan, 6th Baron Tredegar, who was previously the wife of the late Commander Archibald Boyd Russell. After his death, the Barony devolved upon his sister Elisabeth Vintcent, 10th Baroness Wharton.

Peerage of England
Preceded by Charles Kemeys-Tynte	Baron Wharton; 1934–1969	Succeeded by Elisabeth Vintcent
