= Charles Kemeys-Tynte, 8th Baron Wharton =

British aristocrat and Justice of the Peace (1876-1934)

The Right Honourable The Lord Wharton JP
- Born: 18 September 1876
- Died: 4 March 1934 (aged 57)
- Occupation: Justice of the peace
- Spouse: Dorothy Ellis (m. 1899)
- Children: 2; John Kemeys-Tynte; Elisabeth Kemeys-Tynte

Charles Theodore Halswell Kemeys-Tynte, 8th Baron Wharton JP (18 September 1876 – 4 March 1934) was a British aristocrat and Justice of the Peace. He was the son of Halswell Milborne Kemeys-Tynte.

He served as a JP of Monmouth & Somerset, he was also an honorary Lieutenant in the Army 1915–1918. He had also served as a Lieutenant of the Royal Monmouthshire Royal Engineers. The abeyance of the Barony of Wharton was terminated in his favour by Writ of Summons to Parliament 15 February 1916. In 1899 he married Dorothy Ellis and had issue John Kemeys-Tynte, 9th Baron Wharton and Elisabeth Kemeys-Tynte, 10th Baroness Wharton.

Peerage of England
| Preceded by Jane Wharton | Baron Wharton; 1916–1934 | Succeeded by John Kemeys-Tynte |
