= Thomas Wharton (died 1622) =

English landowner and politician

Sir Thomas Wharton (c 1588 – 17 April 1622) was an English landowner and politician who sat in the House of Commons between 1614 and 1622.

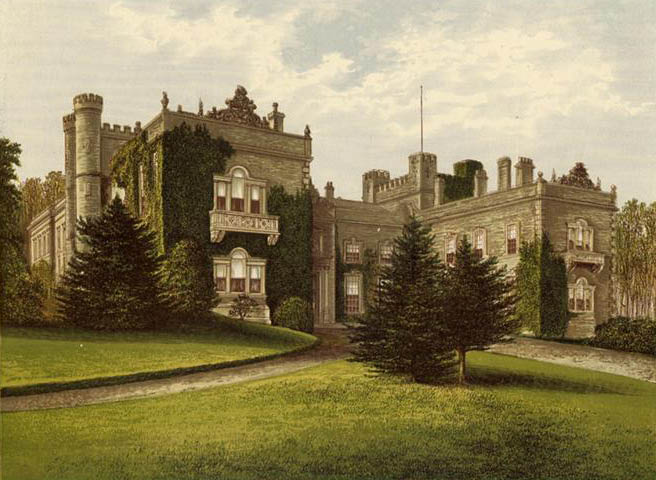
Aske Hall, Easby, Yorkshire in 1880

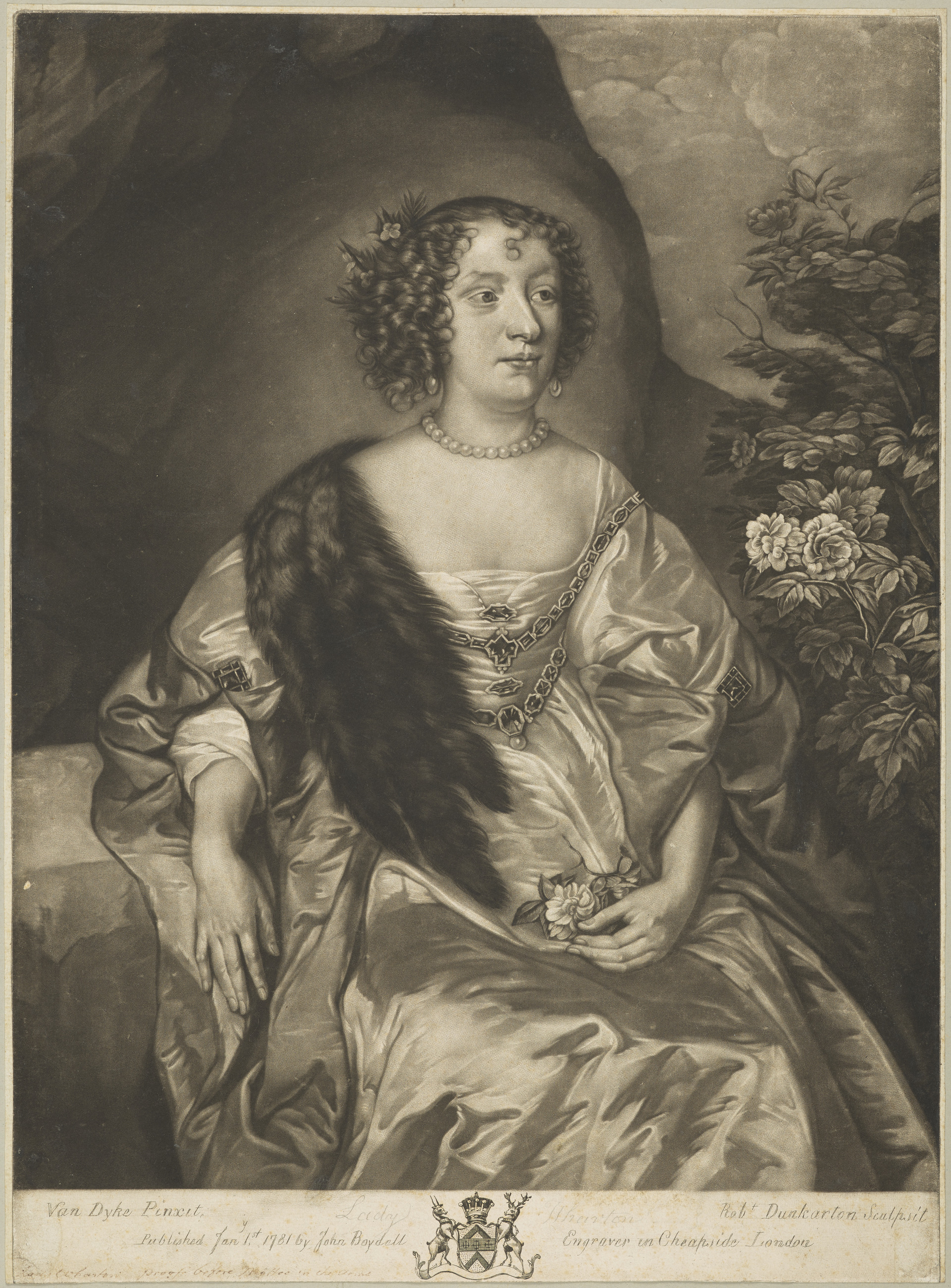
His wife, Lady Philadelphia Carey

Wharton was the second son of Philip Wharton, 3rd Baron Wharton and his wife Lady Frances Clifford, second daughter of Henry Clifford, 2nd Earl of Cumberland. He purchased the estate of Aske Hall at Easby, Yorkshire from Lady Eleanor Bowes, a distant relative early in 1611 and was knighted at Whitehall on 25 April 1611. In 1614, he was elected Member of Parliament for Westmorland and re-elected in 1621.

King James came to Aske on 16 April 1617.

Wharton died at the age of about 34. He had married Lady Philadelphia Carey, daughter of Robert Carey, 1st Earl of Monmouth on 11 April 1611. His elder brother George had been killed in a duel in 1609, and thus his eldest son young Philip inherited the barony when the 3rd Baron died in 1625. Wharton's second son Thomas was also MP for Westmorland.

Parliament of England
Preceded by Sir Richard Musgrave; Sir Thomas Strickland	Member of Parliament for Westmorland; 1614–1622; With: Lord Clifford	Succeeded by Sir John Lowther; Robert Strickland
