= Philip Wharton, 4th Baron Wharton =

English soldier and politician

The Right Honourable The Lord Wharton
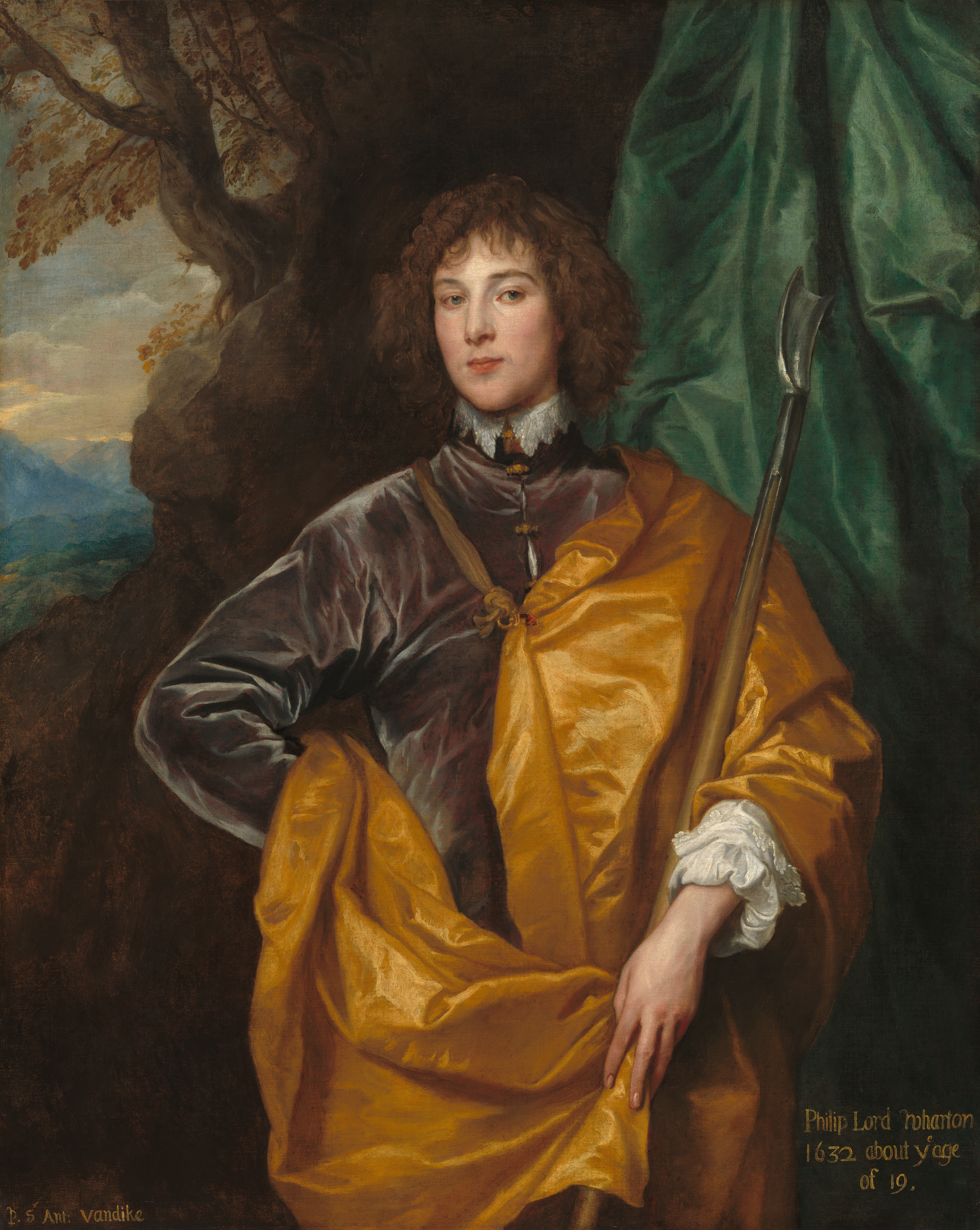
- Lord Wharton, 1632, by Van Dyck.

Personal details
- Born: 18 April 1613
- Died: 4 February 1696 (aged 82)
- Spouse(s): Elizabeth Wandesford; Jane Goodwin; Anne Popham
- Children: 10
- Parents: Sir Thomas Wharton (father); Lady Philadelphia Carey (mother)

Philip Wharton, 4th Baron Wharton (18 April 1613 – 4 February 1696) was an English soldier, politician and diplomat. He was a Parliamentarian during the English Civil War.

Wharton was the son of Sir Thomas Wharton of Aske Hall and his wife Lady Philadelphia Carey, daughter of Robert Carey, 1st Earl of Monmouth and Elizabeth Trevannion. His father died in 1622 and he inherited the peerage on the death of his grandfather in 1625.

== Parliamentarianism ==
Wharton was appointed as the Lord Lieutenant of Buckinghamshire by Parliament in July 1642. He led an armed force to seize the local magazine at Manchester, a puritan stronghold. However Lord Strange arrived first. Nevertheless, some of the local inhabitants resisted his entry to the town and suffered one casualty in repelling him. This is one of the first skirmishes of the First English Civil War. He also served on the Committee for Both Kingdoms. He was involved in unmasking a plot involving Thomas Ogle, which aimed to separate any unity between the Scottish Covenanters and the English Parliament, while simultaneously drawing the Independents to support the King in exchange for religious toleration. He was a Puritan and a favourite of Oliver Cromwell.

== After the restoration ==
Following the restoration of the monarchy, he frequently ran into difficulty with the Crown. In 1676 he was imprisoned in the Tower of London and later (in 1685) fled the country when King James II came to the throne.

He spent time while abroad in the Court of the Prince of Orange and subsequently his family line was back in Royal favour when the latter came to the throne of England in 1688. He was unfailing in his admiration for Cromwell, and his belief that Parliament had been in the right in the Civil War: in 1689 he angrily demanded that Henry Hyde, 2nd Earl of Clarendon, withdraw a reference to the Civil War as a rebellion.

He had one surviving daughter, Elizabeth, by his first wife, Elizabeth Wandesford. By his second wife, Jane, only daughter of Colonel Arthur Goodwin and heiress to the extensive Goodwin estates in Buckinghamshire, he had seven additional children: Anne, Margaret, Thomas Wharton, 1st Marquess of Wharton, Mary, Goodwin, Philadelphia, and Henry. On 21 April 1658, his second wife Jane died and on 26 August 1661, he married for the third time. Lord Wharton married Anne Popham (née Carr), the widow of Colonel Edward Popham. Anne brought two children from her marriage with Edward: Letitia aged 13 and Alexander aged 12. Alexander was a deaf-mute and under the guidance of Dr. John Wallis in Oxford, was one of the first deaf people in the world to learn to speak. Lord Wharton and his third wife had a son named William, born around June/July 1662. William died on 14 December 1687, killed in a duel.

Lord Wharton was a prominent art collector and patron. In the 1630s he commissioned a series of portraits painted by Anthony van Dyck of several members of his family, including himself, his wife Jane, his father-in-law Arthur Goodwin, and his daughters Philadelphia and Elizabeth.

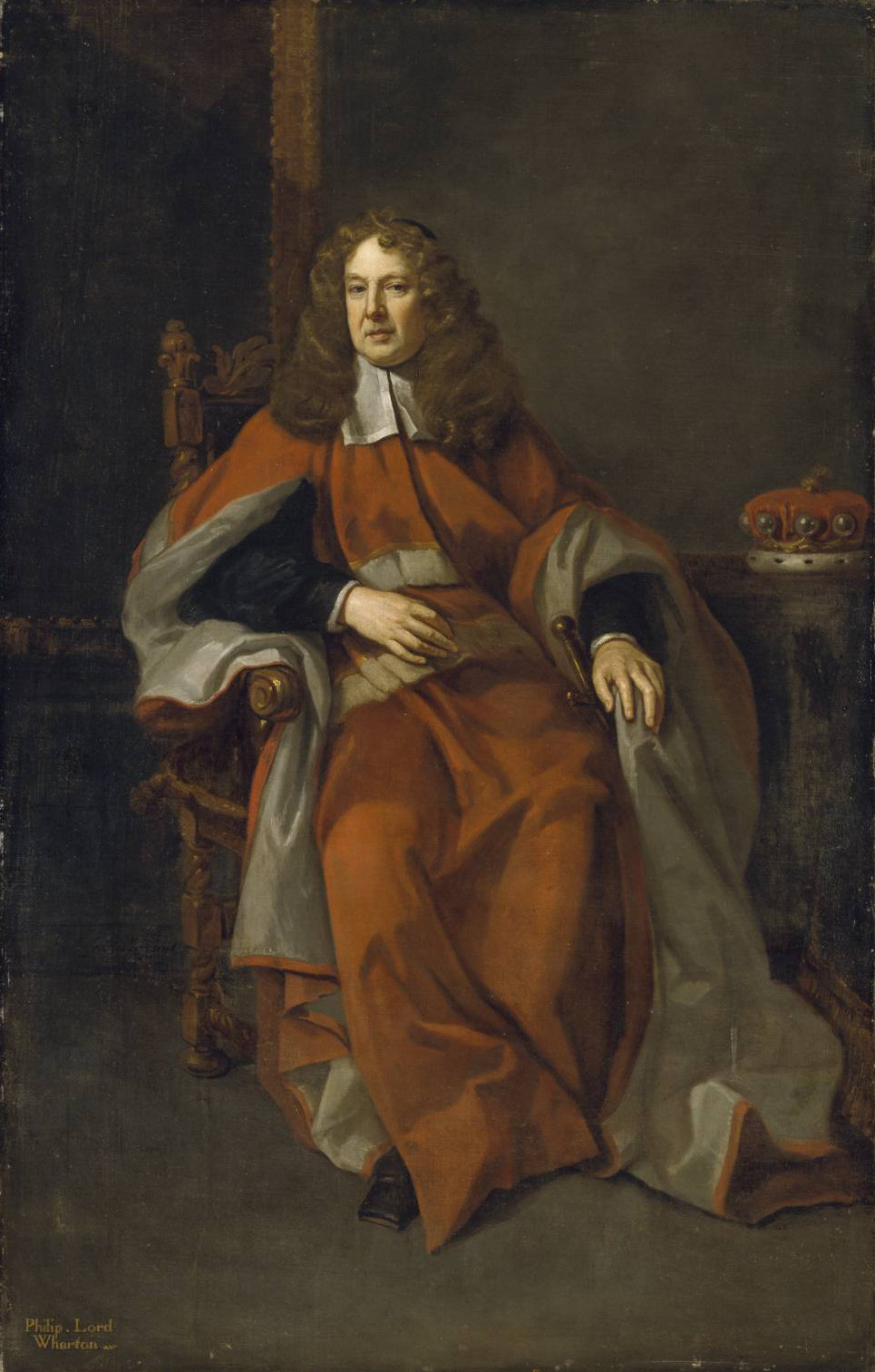
Lord Wharton in a 1685 portrait by Kneller.

Lord Wharton gave much support to church ministers, particularly those who shared his perspectives. he also gave money to establish chapels at Ravenstonedale and Smarber and to provide for the ministers at both places. The latter survives as Low Row United Reformed Church.

In his will, he left land near York to support a Bible charity, which was devoted to the distribution of bibles to children for use outside of the church or school. The terms of the will require the recipient to learn by rote the 1st, 15th, 25th, 37th, 101st, 113th, 145th psalms. The will also requires the Shorter Catechism also be included. Many thousands of Bibles have been distributed and the Trust still distributes Bibles to under eighteen-year-olds. http://www.lordwhartonbibles.org.uk/

Honorary titles
Preceded by The Lord Paget	Lord Lieutenant of Buckinghamshire (Parliamentarian); 1642	Succeeded by Vacant
Peerage of England
Preceded by Philip Wharton	Baron Wharton; 1625–1695	Succeeded by Thomas Wharton
