= Lord Lonsdale's ninepins =

Lord Lonsdale's ninepins, Sir James's ninepins, or Lowther's ninepins, was a derogatory label applied to certain Members of Parliament during the Georgian era who owed their Parliamentary seats to the patronage of James Lowther, 1st Earl of Lonsdale (1736–1802).

Sir James Lowther, who was ennobled as Earl of Lonsdale in 1784, was the scion of an old Cumberland family. He succeeded his father in his baronetcy and estates in 1745 and inherited the wealth and estates of two other branches of the family on the death of a cousin in 1756. He thus became the richest commoner in England while still in his minority, and wielded enormous power in the northwestern counties of England. Under his mother's tuition, he began his involvement in Parliamentary affairs in 1753 with a struggle with Sackville Tufton, 8th Earl of Thanet over the borough of Appleby in Westmorland, where both had inherited a Parliamentary interest. This was to develop into an obsessive campaign to control Parliamentary representation and dictate civil and military appointments in Westmorland and Cumberland, in which Lowther spent his fortune lavishly and made many enemies.

The height of his electoral power was reached in the general elections of 1780 and 1784, when he obtained the return of two of his candidates for Westmorland, one for Cumberland, two for Cockermouth, one for Appleby, one for Carlisle and two for the Surrey borough of Haslemere, control of which he purchased in 1780. While politicians of note such as Charles Jenkinson and William Pitt the Younger had heretofore been returned under his direction, his insistence on absolute obedience from the Members he nominated led them to find other seats or break with him. The last of these was Pitt, returned in 1781 for Appleby; the members returned in 1784, and after, were either relatives, personal friends, or dependent clients of Lonsdale, political non-entities who achieved no distinction in the House of Commons.

The following comprise the "ninepins" who sat at Lowther's direction from 1780 until 1790 (aside from Lowther himself, returned for both Haslemere and Cumberland in 1780 and sitting for the latter):

- John Baynes Garforth: returned for Cockermouth in 1780 and Haslemere in 1784. Steward and agent of Lonsdale.
- Sir Michael le Fleming: returned for Westmorland in 1780 and 1784. A friend of Lonsdale.
- Edward Knubley: returned for Carlisle in 1786 after the Earl of Surrey succeeded as Duke of Norfolk, but unseated there on petition in 1787. A placeman of Lonsdale's.
- James Lowther: returned for Westmorland in 1780 and 1784, and Haslemere in 1780, where he did not sit. Fourth cousin of Lonsdale and second to him in two duels.
- John Lowther: returned for Cockermouth in 1780 and 1784, for Carlisle in 1786, but unseated on petition the same year, and for Haslemere in 1786. Third cousin twice removed of Lonsdale.
- William Lowther: returned for Carlisle in 1780 and Cumberland in 1784, and for Appleby, where he did not sit, in 1780. Third cousin twice removed of Lonsdale.
- Edward Norton: returned for Haslemere in 1780 and Carlisle in 1784. Lonsdale's friend and electoral agent in Lancaster.
- Richard Penn: returned for Appleby in 1784. Grandson of William Penn and a friend of Lonsdale.
- William Pitt the Younger: returned for Appleby in 1781 to replace William Lowther, sitting for Carlisle.
- Thomas Postlethwaite: returned for Haslemere. His identity is not certain and he was evidently a dependent of Lonsdale's.
- James Clarke Satterthwaite: returned for Cockermouth in 1784. A retainer and electoral agent for Lonsdale.
- Humphrey Senhouse: returned for Cockermouth in 1786 after John Lowther succeeded the deceased Norton at Carlisle (Lowther was unseated on petition the same year). A friend of Lonsdale.
- Walter Spencer-Stanhope: returned for Haslemere in 1780 after Sir James Lowther (Lonsdale) chose to sit for Cumberland. Third cousin twice removed of Lonsdale.

Before the general election of 1790, two of Lonsdale's members were ousted at Carlisle on electoral petitions, and he also withdrew support from his cousins John and William, perhaps because the latter (only) broke with him over the Regency Bill. While he was not able to control all nine seats at subsequent elections, he got Penn returned at Lancaster in 1796 after a string of defeats, and continued his expensive and unscrupulous electioneering until his death in 1802. William, with whom he was reconciled in 1801, inherited his fortune and electoral interests.

The term "Lord Lonsdale's ninepins" was made popular by a piece of wit attributed to Richard Brinsley Sheridan. According to the story, Edmund Burke made a cutting, sarcastic reply to a speech by one of Lonsdale's members that drew cheers from the House of Commons. Charles James Fox, arriving in the midst of this, asked Sheridan what had caused the cheering, to which Sheridan replied "Burke has knocked down one of Lord Lonsdale's ninepins". However, most of the members returned in 1784 are not known to have spoken in the House (William Lowther did so twice and le Fleming once). A. M. W. Stirling reports a passage between "another of Sir James's ninepins", James Adair (seated for Cockermouth by Lonsdale) and Burke in 1775, but Lonsdale did not control nine seats at the time (he returned seven members in 1774).
