= John Baynes Garforth =

British politician

John Baynes Garforth (1727? – 15 October 1808), born John Baynes, was an English attorney and man of business for James Lowther, 1st Earl of Lonsdale. As one of "Lord Lonsdale's ninepins", he sat as a Member of Parliament for two of Lonsdale's pocket boroughs from 1780 through 1802.

Baynes was baptized on 24 January 1727. He was the second son of Ralph Baynes of Mewith Head Hall in Bentham, and his second wife Elizabeth Garforth. In 1744, he succeeded his maternal uncle Edward in the Garforth estates and adopted his surname. Trained to the law, he qualified as an attorney in 1750 and practiced in London. Before 1755, he had married a Miss Shrimpley there, by whom he had one son and two daughters.

He acted as the attorney for Robert Mackreth, and was involved in his transactions with James Fox-Lane, which terminated in a lawsuit won by the latter. However, he is principally known for his role as steward, agent, and attorney for Sir James Lowther (created Earl of Lonsdale in 1784). Lowther was believed to be the richest commoner in England by the time he reached his majority in 1757, and employed his fortune, influence and energy on an obsessive attempt to dominate the Parliamentary representation of northwestern England. At the height of his influence, he returned nine members to Parliament, "Lord Lonsdale's ninepins", whom he expected to vote and act completely in obedience to his directions.

Lowther obtained the appointment of Baynes Garforth as clerk of the peace for Cumberland in 1768, although the routine work of this office was delegated to the Carlisle attorney Joseph Hodgson. By the 1780 British general election, Lowther had obtained control of nine seats by buying control of the pocket borough of Haslemere, and put Baynes Garforth in at Cockermouth, a Cumberland pocket borough of Lonsdale's, as one of the "ninepins". During his tenure as an MP, he lived at No. 39, Brook Street. At the 1784 British general election, he was switched to Haslemere. Lowther's members rarely showed independence (or kept their seats if they did), and Baynes Garforth was not exceptional in this regard. Following Lowther, he was in opposition to the Fox-North Coalition, and then supported Pitt (who sat in one of Lowther's seats from 1781 to 1784) until 1788, when Lowther, now Earl of Lonsdale, broke with Pitt over the Regency Bill. He is not known to have spoken in the House of Commons.

At the 1790 British general election, Baynes Garforth was put in for Cockermouth again. By this time Lonsdale had been reconciled with Pitt and Baynes Garforth continued to act as part of Lonsdale's voting bloc. He was to be rewarded with the post of collector of customs for Carlisle, but as this was incompatible with his sitting in Parliament, it was given in trust to a Mr. Fearon instead. Baynes Garforth sued Fearon to collect the revenues he felt were due him, resulting in a ruling by the Court of Common Pleas that the holding of offices in trust was illegal. Lonsdale died shortly before the 1802 United Kingdom general election, and his successor, William Lowther, 2nd Viscount Lowther, replaced Baynes Garforth at Cockermouth with his own attorney, James Graham. Baynes Garforth did not sit in Parliament again, and died on 15 October 1808.

Parliament of Great Britain
Preceded by Ralph Gowland; James Adair	Member of Parliament for Cockermouth; 1780–1784; With: John Lowther	Succeeded by John Lowther; James Clarke Satterthwaite
Preceded by Edward Norton; Walter Spencer-Stanhope	Member of Parliament for Haslemere; 1784–1790; With: Thomas Postlethwaite 1784–1786; John Lowther 1786–1790	Succeeded by James Lowther; William Gerard Hamilton
Preceded by James Clarke Satterthwaite; Humphrey Senhouse	Member of Parliament for Cockermouth; 1790–1800; With: Sir John Anstruther 1790–1796; Edward Burrow 1796–1800; Walter Spencer-Stanhope 1800	Succeeded by Parliament of the United Kingdom
Parliament of the United Kingdom
Preceded by Parliament of Great Britain	Member of Parliament for Cockermouth; 1801–1802; With: Walter Spencer-Stanhope 1801–1802	Succeeded by James Graham; Robert Plumer Ward
