= James Clarke Satterthwaite =

British politician

James Clarke Satterthwaite (1746–1827) was a British politician who sat in the House of Commons during the late 18th and early 19th centuries.

Satterthwaite was a placeman for James Lowther, 1st Earl of Lonsdale. He died on 28 November 1827.

Parliament of Great Britain
Preceded by John Baynes Garforth; John Lowther	Member of Parliament for Cockermouth; 1784–1790; With: John Lowther 1784–1786; Humphrey Senhouse 1786–1790	Succeeded by John Baynes Garforth; Sir John Anstruther
Preceded by John Christian; Rowland Stephenson	Member of Parliament for Carlisle; 1790–1791; With: Edward Knubley	Succeeded by Wilson Gale-Braddyll; John Christian Curwen
Preceded by William Gerard Hamilton; Richard Penn	Member of Parliament for Haslemere; 1791–1800; With: William Gerard Hamilton 1791–1796; James Lowther 1796; George Wood 1796–1800	Succeeded by Parliament of the United Kingdom
Parliament of the United Kingdom
Preceded by Parliament of Great Britain	Member of Parliament for Haslemere; 1801–1802; With: George Wood	Succeeded by Viscount Garlies; Richard Penn
