= Thomas Postlethwaite (MP) =

British politician

Thomas Postlethwaite was a British politician. One of "Lord Lonsdale's ninepins", he represented the pocket borough of Haslemere, in Surrey, from 1784 to 1786.

Postlethwaite's identity is uncertain. He may have been the son of Rev. James Postlethwaite of Fleckney, Leicestershire, or a member of a Cumberland family. He was a client of James Lowther, 1st Earl of Lonsdale, a peer notorious for his attempts to control Parliamentary representation in the northwest of England, and who had bought up the burgages at Haslemere in 1780 to obtain sole control over its elections. Returned by Lonsdale in the 1784 British general election, he was, like Lonsdale's other members, expected to rigidly adhere to his patron's line in politics, which at the time amounted to support for Pitt's ministry and its measures. He vacated the seat by taking the Chiltern Hundreds in 1786 to make way for Lonsdale's relative, John Lowther, who had been ousted from a seat at Carlisle on petition. Postlethwaite did not sit in Parliament again, and may have been the banker who died in 1829.

== Notes ==
Parliament of Great Britain
Preceded by Edward Norton; Walter Spencer-Stanhope	Member of Parliament for Haslemere; 1784–1786; With: John Baynes Garforth	Succeeded by John Baynes Garforth; John Lowther
