= Henry Fawcett (MP) =

English merchant and politician (1762–1816)

Member of Parliament for Carlisle
- In office 1812–1816 Serving with Sir James Graham, Bt
- Preceded by: Walter Spencer-Stanhope; John Christian Curwen
- Succeeded by: Sir James Graham, Bt; John Christian Curwen

Member of Parliament for Grampound
- In office 1806–1807 Serving with Christopher Hawkins
- Preceded by: Benjamin Hobhouse; Christopher Hawkins
- Succeeded by: Hon. Andrew Cochrane-Johnstone; Hon. George Cochrane

Personal details
- Born: 26 May 1762 Dent, Cumbria
- Died: 15 February 1816 (aged 53)
- Spouse: Helen Hutchins Bellasis (m. 1794; died 1816)
- Relations: Rowland Stephenson (uncle)
- Children: 8
- Parent(s): James Fawcett; Agnes Stephenson

Henry Fawcett (26 May 1762 – 15 February 1816) of Scaleby Castle, was an English merchant and politician.

== Early life ==
Fawcett was born into the prominent Fawcett family on 26 May 1762 at Broadfield House, in Dent, Cumbria. He was the eldest son of James Fawcett of Broadfield, and Agnes (née Stephenson) Fawcett. He succeeded to his father's estate in 1803. His younger brother, Rowland Fawcett, was married to Frances Mercy Farish.

His maternal grandparents were Dorothy (née Dennison) Stephenson and Henry Stephenson of Docker Garth and Lupton High, Cumberland, and his uncle was prominent banker Rowland Stephenson of Scaleby Castle, MP for Carlisle from 1787 to 1790.

== Career ==
While in the service of the East India Company, he was one of the original partners of the firm of Bruce & Fawcett of Bombay. He left India in 1803 and took up residence at 47 Portland Place, continuing his partnership with Patrick Craufurd Bruce, George Simson, and John de Ponthieu. Like his business partners, he sought a seat in the House of Commons, and purchased one at Grampound from Christopher Hawkins in 1806. In 1812, with his mother's family seat of Scaleby Castle as his base, he contested Carlisle, which his uncle Rowland had represented from 1787 to 1790. He represented Carlisle until his death in February 1816.

He launched the 1798 ship, Scaleby Castle.

== Personal life ==
On 18 February 1794 at Bombay, he married Helen Hutchins Bellasis (1777–1840), the only daughter of Anne Martha (née Hutchins) Bellasis (a daughter of John Hutchins) and Maj.-Gen. John Bellasis, East India Company Artillery. Together, they were the parents of five sons and three daughters, including:

- Agnes Fawcett (1795–1831), who married Strickland Charles Edward Neville-Rolfe.
- Henry Fawcett (1798–1884), a captain in the Bombay Cavalry; he married Mary Sophia Sullivan in 1837.
- James Fawcett (1800–1831), who married Isabella Pruen. After his death, she married his step-father, Barrington Tristram.
- John Fawcett (1802–1878), a Lt.-Col. with the Bombay Army and mayor of Brighton; he married Amelia Smith. After her death, he married Eliza Arnold.
- Edward Gordon Fawcett (1806–1875), of the Bombay Civil Service; he married Louisa Charlotte Hill.

Fawcett died on 15 February 1816 "after a horse had stepped on his foot". At the time of his death, he owned the Coldale Hall Estate in Caldecot under the Dean and Chapter's Manor of John le Chappele. After his death, his widow married Barrington Tristram, of the Royal Army, before her own death on 23 March 1840.

=== Descendants ===
Through his son Henry, he was posthumously a grandfather Edward Boyd Fawcett (1839–1884), an equerry to the Prince of Wales (later King Edward VII) who was the father of philosopher Edward Douglas Fawcett and explorer Percy Harrison Fawcett.

Through his daughter Agnes, he was a grandfather of Charles Fawcett Neville-Rolfe.

Parliament of the United Kingdom
Preceded by Benjamin Hobhouse; Christopher Hawkins	Member of Parliament for Grampound; 1806–1807; With: Christopher Hawkins	Succeeded by Hon. Andrew Cochrane-Johnstone; Hon. George Cochrane
Preceded by Walter Spencer-Stanhope; John Christian Curwen	Member of Parliament for Carlisle; 1812–1816; With: Sir James Graham, Bt	Succeeded by Sir James Graham, Bt; John Christian Curwen
