= Hyde House, Buckinghamshire =

Grade II listed country house in Buckinghamshire, England

Coordinates: 51°42′1.21″N 0°39′43.11″W

Hyde House is a Grade II listed early 18th-century country house near Hyde Heath in Buckinghamshire, England. It had previously belonged to Woburn Abbey and was known as Chesham Woburn Manor.

Hyde House was owned by the politician and barrister Robert Plumer Ward in the early 19th century. In 1811, Ward anticipated the dismissal of the government in the wake of the passing of the Regency Act, and looked forward to "...being at Hyde House in a fortnight. My garden, farm, plantations and library are the prevailing ideas, and every purchase I have lately made, whether books or pruning-knives are all with a view to my long wished retreat." Ward retired to Hyde House in 1823 to write his novel Tremaine, or The Man of Refinement. The writer and scholar Isaac D'Israeli rented the house during the autumn of 1825, and his son, Benjamin Disraeli, the future Prime Minister of the United Kingdom, later claimed that he wrote his novel Vivian Grey at the house before his 21st birthday in December 1825. However, that has been considered unbelievable considering the short time and the large size of the novel. Tremaine has subsequently been claimed as a model for Vivian Gray.

Architectural historian Nikolaus Pevsner, in the Buckinghamshire edition of his Buildings of England describes Hyde House as having the "proportions of a late c17 or c18 house hidden behind the stucco and sashes of the early c19." Pevsner also believed that some "antiquarian flourishes" such "heraldic glass, lattice glazing and shields of arms" might have dated from Plumer Ward's occupancy of the house. Pevsner noted that a long wing had been built on the house in 1929, and an early 18th-century staircase was also highlighted.

During the Second World War, the patients of the pioneering plastic surgeon Archibald McIndoe recuperated at Hyde House.

After the war, Hyde House was a school before being converted into apartments in 1965. It was subsequently bought in 2000 and converted back from apartments into a single house. The gardens at Hyde House featured in Country Life magazine in June 2012.

The grounds of Hyde House also contain a Grade II listed granary and dovecote, which is now a summer house. It is believed to date from the 17th or 18th century.
