= Robert Plumer Ward =

British politician

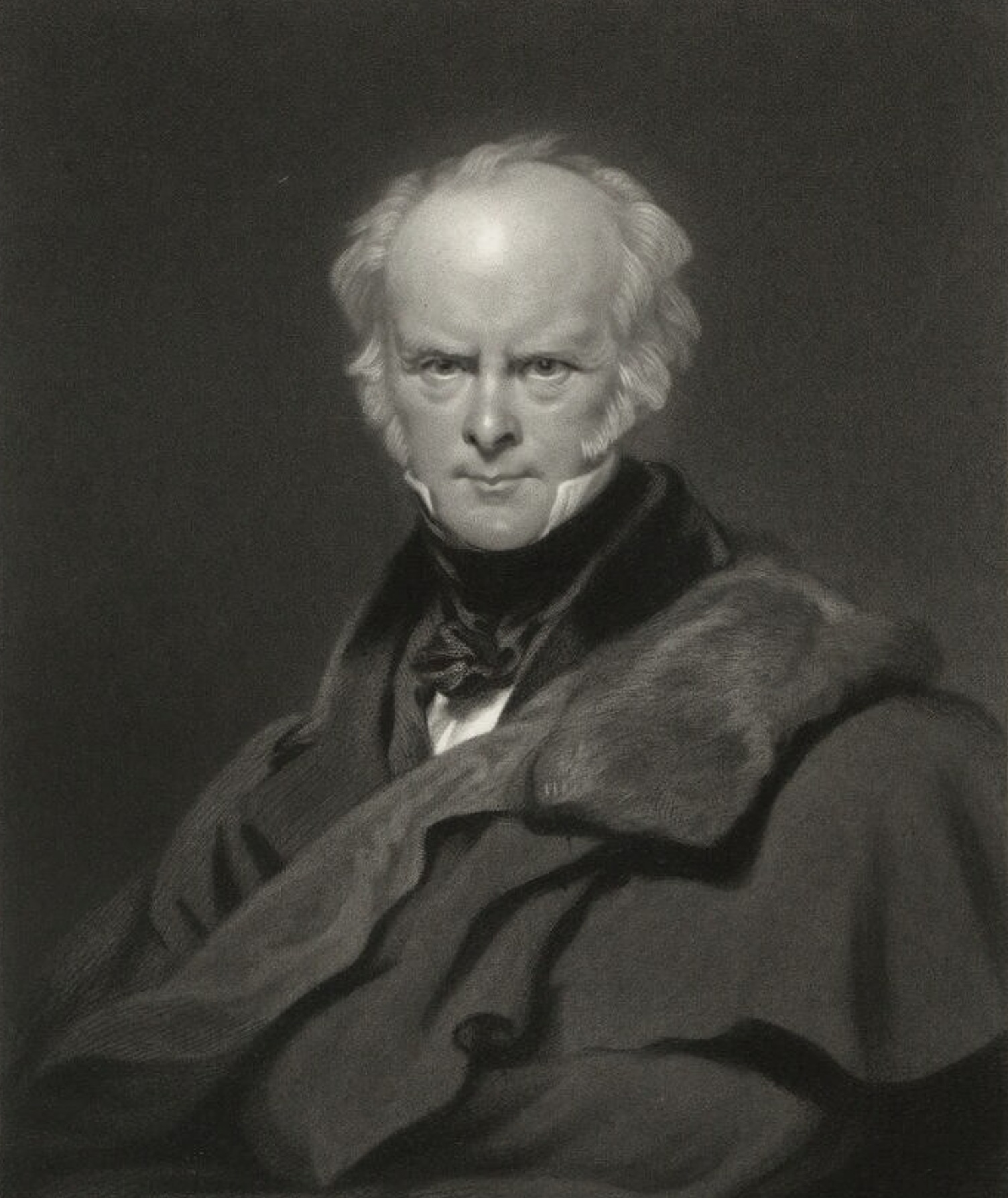
1850 portrait of Ward

Robert Plumer Ward (born Robert Ward; 19 March 1765 – 13 August 1846) was an English barrister, politician, and novelist. George Canning said that his law books were as pleasant as novels, and his novels as dull as law books.

== Life ==
He was born in Mount Street, Mayfair, London, on 19 March 1765, the son of John Ward by his wife Rebecca Raphael. His father was a merchant in Gibraltar and, also for many years, was chief clerk to the civil department of the ordnance in the garrison there. His mother belonged to a Sephardic Jewish family from Genoa. Robert Ward was educated first at Robert Macfarlane's private school at Walthamstow, and then at Westminster School. He entered Christ Church, Oxford, matriculating on 12 February 1783. In 1785 he became a student of the Inner Temple.

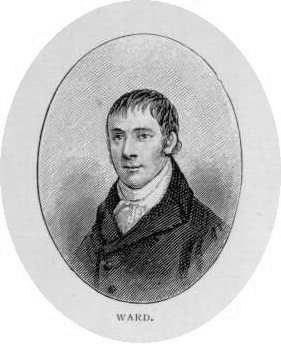
Robert Plumer Ward as a young man

Ward then passed some years abroad, and travelled in France during the early part of the revolutionary period. He was called to the bar on 17 June 1790, and soon after went the western circuit. In London in 1794, a chance conversation in Bell Yard near Fleet Street put him in possession of information about subversion, and Ward took it to Richard Ford, who was a police magistrate. Ford took Ward directly to William Pitt the Prime Minister, and the law officers Archibald Macdonald and John Scott. This fortuitous discovery gave Ward his political and legal contacts.

Ward now switched from the western to the northern circuit, to take advantage of his new connections. He had also a small common-law practice in London and before the privy council. He wrote another legal work to order, for the government. A reward in the shape of a judgeship in Nova Scotia was offered Ward; then in June 1802, he received from Pitt an offer of a safe seat in the House of Commons. Ward was Member of Parliament (MP) for Cockermouth from 1802 to 1806, after Pitt had recommended him to Lord Lowther for the seat. He was returned on 8 July 1802, but did not speak in the house till 13 December, when, somewhat to the annoyance of his friends, he supported Henry Addington.

Pitt returned to power in summer 1804. Lord Mulgrave succeeded Lord Harrowby at the Foreign Office at the beginning of 1805, and gave Ward (a family connection through their wives) the post of under-secretary, Ward resigning a sinecure post he held as Welsh judge. Charles James Fox took over from Mulgrave in 1806, and Ward lost the post, taken up by George Hammond. On the formation of the Duke of Portland's ministry of 1807, with the appointment of Mulgrave as First Lord of the Admiralty, Ward was given a seat on the Admiralty board.

Ward was MP for Haslemere from 1807 to 1823. Turning down an offer of a Treasury lordship, Ward remained at the Admiralty till June 1811, when he was appointed Clerk of the Ordnance. He served in this office under Mulgrave, who was head of the department, till 1823. He made a lengthy report on the state of the ordnance department in Ireland, which was published on 9 November 1816. The following year he made a survey of the eastern and southern coast of England for the same purpose, and in 1819 for the north of England. Retiring from the Commons after the session of 1823, he was appointed auditor of the Civil List.

Ward owned Hyde House near Hyde Heath in Buckinghamshire, in the early 19th century. In 1811, he anticipated the dismissal of the government in the wake of the passing of the Regency Act, and looked forward to "...being at Hyde House in a fortnight. My garden, farm, plantations and library are the prevailing ideas, and every purchase I have lately made, whether books or pruning-knives are all with a view to my long wished retreat." Ward retired as a widower to Hyde House in 1823 to write his novel Trentaine, or The Man of Refinement.

He was married for a second time in 1828 to Jane Plumer, the widow and heiress of William Plumer (1736–1822), adopted the additional name of Plumer and took up residence at Gilston Park, Hertfordshire, which his wife had inherited from her late husband. In 1832 he was appointed High Sheriff. His office as auditor of the Civil List was incorporated into the treasury in January 1831, and, again a widower, he spent time abroad.

He was married for a third time in 1833 to Mary, the daughter of General Sir George Anson. In 1845, the couple were living at 2 Upper Brook Street, Mayfair. Early in 1846 he moved with his wife to the official residence of her father, who was the governor of Chelsea Hospital, and died there on 13 August the same year. There is a portrait of Ward by Henry Perronet Briggs, an engraving of which by Charles Turner is prefixed to his Memoirs.

== Works ==
He wrote non-fiction and fiction, with some books on international law.

- An Enquiry into the Foundation and History of the Law of Nations in Europe from the Time of the Greeks and Romans to the Age of Grotius. Vol. I. London: Printed by A. Strahan and W. Woodfall for J. Butterworth. 1795 – via Internet Archive. This has been regarded as the first attempt to write a history of international law. It was at the suggestion of William Scott.
- A Treatise of the relative Rights and Duties of Belligerents and Neutral Powers in Maritime Affairs, in which the Principles of the armed Neutralities and the Opinions of Hübner and Schlegel are fully discussed (1801). This work related to the Second League of Armed Neutrality 1800–1 and was undertaken at Lord Grenville's request, as Foreign Secretary, to represent the rights of belligerents from the British point of view. It was not published in complete form, and in an introduction to an 1875 reprint, Henry Stanley, 3rd Baron Stanley of Alderley commented on the extremely low subsequent profile of the work.
- An Essay on Contraband; being a Continuation of the Treatise of the relative Rights and Duties (1801).
- A View of the relative Situations of Mr. Pitt and Mr. Addington previous to and on the night of Mr. Patten's Motion (1804) was Ward's (anonymous) involvement in early 1804 in a pamphlet war, on Pitt's side against supporters of the Addington Ministry. It had been set off by A Few Cursory Remarks upon the State of Parties (1803, anonymous, by Thomas Richard Bentley). Henry Addington was probably not involved, but Hiley Addington and Charles Bragge quite likely were; on Pitt's side Thomas Courtenay was used to reply, but Ward involved himself on his own initiative. There was a reply from John Adolphus.
- An Enquiry into the Manner in which the different Wars of Europe have commenced during the last two Centuries (1804 or 1805). This work defended the seizure of a Spanish treasure-ship (6 October 1804); and was read and approved by Pitt before publication.
- Tremaine; or, the Man of Refinement (1825), novel.
- De Vere; or, the Man of Independence (1827), novel. In it George Canning is supposedly depicted under the character of Wentworth.
- Illustrations of Human Life, 1837; 2nd edit. 1843. Saint Lawrence in this work is based on a true story, from Joseph Hunter, A True Account of the Alienation and Recovery of the Estates of the Offleys of Norton (1754).
- An Historical Essay on the real Character and Amount of the Precedent of the Revolution of 1688, 1838, 2 vols. When this work was badly reviewed in the Edinburgh Review and styled a Tory pamphlet in the guise of history, Ward answered the reviewer in an anonymous pamphlet entitled The Reviewer Reviewed
- Pictures of the World at Home and Abroad, 1839, 3 vols.
- An Historical Essay on the Real Character and Amount of the Precedent of the Revolution of 1688 (1838)
- De Clifford; or, the Constant Man (1841), novel.

Memoirs of the Political and Literary Life of Robert Plumer Ward appeared in 1850, edited by Edmund Phipps. Selections from Ward's unpublished works are contained in vol. ii. of the Memoir; they are short essays on different subjects under the title of The Day Dreamer. The published portion of Ward's Diary extends from 1809 (when he began it) to 22 November 1820; the remaining portion was not published because the editor regarded it (in 1850) as too recent. Its historical value is that Ward was on intimate terms with Spencer Perceval.

Many of his letters to Peter George Patmore, who advised in literary matters, are in Patmore's Friends and Acquaintances. Ward edited Chatsworth, or the Romance of a Week, a number of tales by Patmore.

== Family ==
Ward married three times.

1. His first marriage, on 2 April 1796, was to Catherine Julia, the fourth daughter of Christopher Thompson Maling of Durham. By it, Ward became acquainted with Henry Phipps, 1st Earl of Mulgrave, who had married the eldest daughter. Henry George Ward, their son, was a diplomat, politician, and travel author.
2. On 16 July 1828 Ward married, secondly, Mrs. Plumer Lewin of Gilston Park, Hertfordshire, and on this occasion took the surname of Plumer in addition to Ward. She died in 1831. Her first husband had been the MP William Plumer, who died in 1822. She then married Captain Richard John Lewin R.N., brother of Harriet Grote, in 1825; he died in 1827. On her death in 1833, the fortune she had from William Plumer passed to Henry George Ward, her stepson.
3. He married, thirdly, in 1833, Mary Anne, the rich widow of Charles Gregory Okeover. She was the daughter of General Sir George Anson and the sister of Admiral Talavera Anson.

Ward was the grandfather of the judge Dudley Ward; the uncle by marriage of his biographer Edmund Phipps, and the great-uncle of the theologian William George Ward.

Parliament of the United Kingdom
Preceded by Walter Spencer Stanhope; John Baynes Garforth	Member of Parliament for Cockermouth; 1802–1806; With: James Graham	Succeeded by James Graham; Viscount Garlies
Preceded by Viscount Garlies; Charles Long	Member of Parliament for Haslemere; 1807–1823; With: Charles Long	Succeeded by George Lowther Thompson; Charles Long
Military offices
Preceded by Cropley Ashley-Cooper	Clerk of the Ordnance; 1811–1823	Succeeded by Sir Henry Hardinge
Honorary titles
Preceded by Thomas Robert Dimsdale	High Sheriff of Hertfordshire; 1832	Succeeded by George Jacob Bosanquet
