= John Bellasis =

John Bellasis may refer to:

- John Bellasis, 1st Baron Bellasis or John Belasyse, 1st Baron Belasyse (1614–1689), English nobleman, soldier and politician
- John Bellasis (East India Company officer) (died 1808), British major-general who was commanding the forces at Bombay
- John Bellasis, a fictional character in the Belgravia TV series
