= John Christian Curwen =

English agriculturist and politician

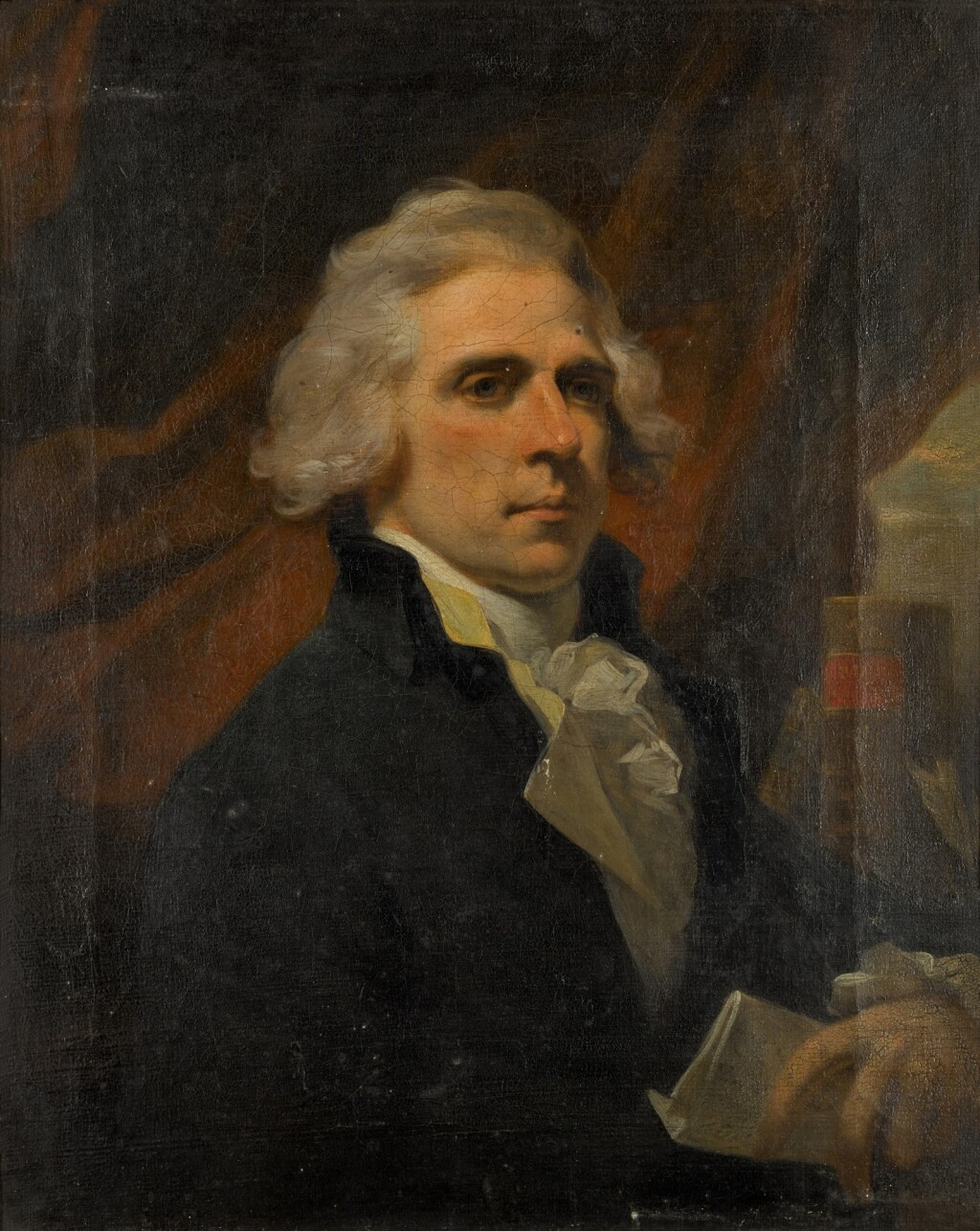
John Christian Curwen

John Christian Curwen, born John Christian (12 July 1756 – 11 December 1828) was an English Member of Parliament and High Sheriff.

== Early life ==
He was born on 12 July 1756. He was the eldest surviving son of John Christian of Ewanrigg, Cumberland (now Cumbria), and the same's wife Jane (née Curwen), who was the daughter of Eldred Curwen of Workington Hall, Cumberland.

He was educated at Peterhouse, Cambridge in 1773 before going on the Grand Tour between 1779 and 1782.

== Career ==
He succeeded his father in 1767 and served as High Sheriff of Cumberland from 1784 to 1785, although he twice refused a peerage.

He was elected Member of Parliament (MP) for Carlisle for 1786 to 1790 and again for 1791 to 1812 and for 1816 to 1820. He was then elected to represent the county seat of Cumberland. He was a member of the Whig party and an active campaigner in Parliament, and known as something of a radical, having approved of the French Revolution.

== Personal life ==
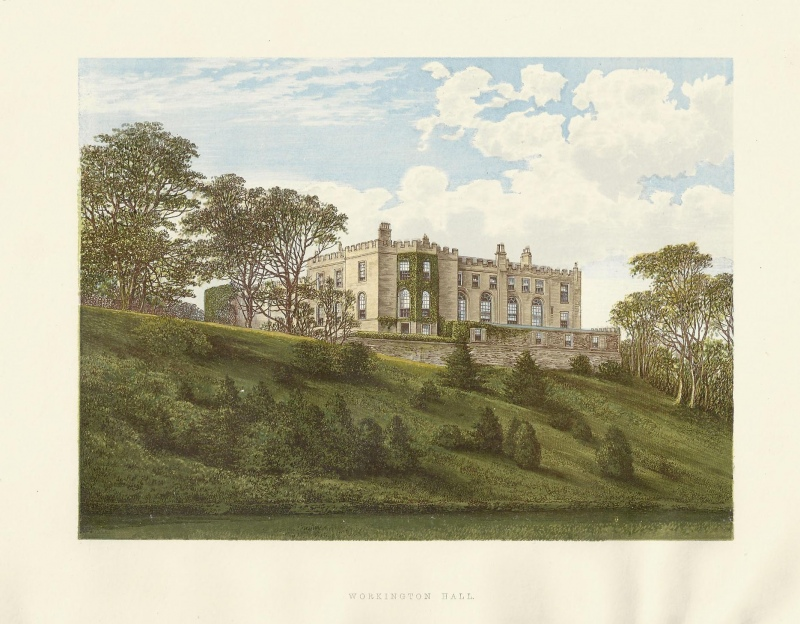
Workington Hall circa 1880

He married twice. His first marriage was on 10 September 1775 to Margaret Taubman (d. 1778), the daughter of John Taubman, Speaker of the House of Keys, of Castletown, Isle of Man, with whom he had a son:

- John Christian (1776–1852), who inherited Ewanrigg Hall and married Susanna Allen, daughter of Lewis Robert Allen of Dalston.

His second marriage was on 5 October 1782 to his cousin Isabella Curwen, the daughter and heiress of Henry Curwen of Workington. On 6 March 1790, he took the name of Curwen after inheriting Workington Hall. Workington Hall, now ruined after a wartime fire, is a Grade I listed building. Together, John and Isabella were the parents of five sons and three daughters, including:

- Henry Curwen (1783–1861), who inherited Workington Hall and married Jane Stanley.

He died on 11 December 1828 in financial difficulties because of increased costs and reduced profits from his coal mines and was buried in an unmarked grave in Workington. At his death, he owed £118,334 and only £16,579 was owed to him.

Parliament of Great Britain
Preceded by Sir John Lowther; The Earl of Surrey	Member of Parliament for Carlisle; 1786–1790; With: The Earl of Surrey to November 1786; Edward Knubley November 1786 – 1787; Rowland Stephenson 1787–1790	Succeeded by James Clarke Satterthwaite; Edward Knubley
Preceded by James Clarke Satterthwaite; Edward Knubley	Member of Parliament for Carlisle; 1791–1800; With: Wilson Gale-Braddyll to 1796; Sir Frederick Fletcher-Vane, 2nd Bt from 1796	Succeeded by Parliament of the United Kingdom
Parliament of the United Kingdom
Preceded by Parliament of Great Britain	Member of Parliament for Carlisle; 1801–1812; With: Sir Frederick Fletcher-Vane, 2nd Baronet to 1802; Walter Spencer-Stanhope from 1802	Succeeded by Sir James Graham, 1st Bt; Henry Fawcett
Preceded by Viscount Morpeth; Sir John Lowther, 1st Bt	Member of Parliament for Cumberland; 1820–1829; With: Sir John Lowther, 1st Bt	Succeeded by Sir James Graham, 2nd Bt; Sir John Lowther, 1st Bt
