= George Stewart, 8th Earl of Galloway =

Royal Navy Admiral and politician (1768–1834)

Admiral The Right Honourable The Earl of Galloway KT
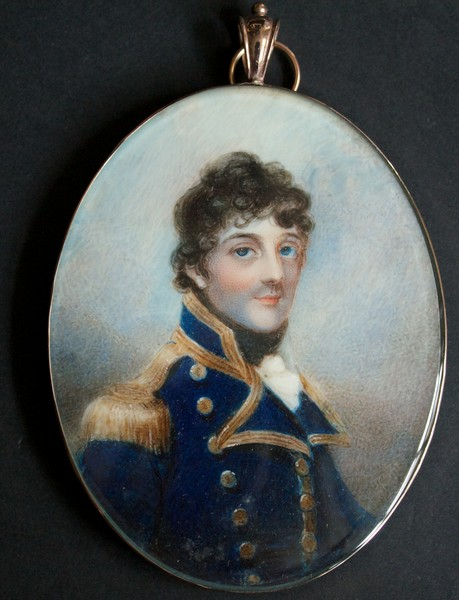
- George Stewart wearing the naval uniform of post-captain. Watercolour on ivory by Anne Mee.

Member of Parliament for Haslemere
- In office 1806 – November 1806
- Preceded by: George Wood
- Succeeded by: Robert Plumer Ward

Member of Parliament for Cockermouth
- In office 22 July 1805 – 1806
- Preceded by: James Graham
- Succeeded by: John Lowther

Member of Parliament for Saltash
- In office 1790 – February 1795
- Preceded by: John Lemon
- Succeeded by: William Stewart

Personal details
- Born: 24 March 1768
- Died: 27 March 1834 (aged 66)
- Party: Tory
- Spouse: Lady Jane Paget
- Children: 8
- Parent(s): John Stewart, 7th Earl of Galloway; Anne Dashwood
- Education: Westminster School
- Awards: Order of the Thistle

Military service
- Allegiance: Great Britain; United Kingdom
- Branch/service: Royal Navy
- Years of service: 1781–1806
- Rank: Admiral
- Commands: HMS Vulcan; HMS Winchelsea; HMS Lively; HMS Hussar; HMS Bellerophon; HMS Ajax
- Battles/wars: American Revolutionary War; Battle of Dogger Bank; Great Siege of Gibraltar; French Revolutionary Wars; Invasion of Guadeloupe; Battle of Cape St Vincent; Napoleonic Wars

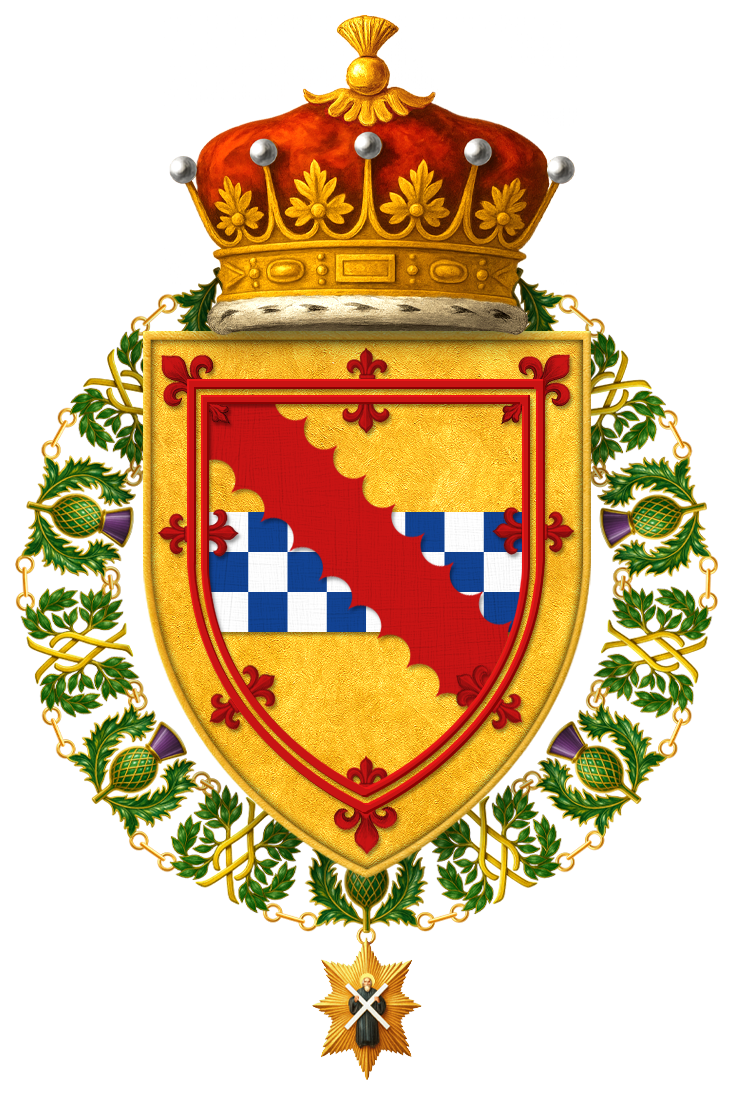
Shield of Arms of George Stewart, 8th Earl of Galloway, KT

Admiral George Stewart, 8th Earl of Galloway, KT (24 March 1768 – 27 March 1834), styled Lord Garlies between 1773 and 1806, was a British naval commander and politician.

== Background ==
Garlies was the eldest son of John Stewart, 7th Earl of Galloway, and Anne, daughter of Sir James Dashwood, 2nd Baronet, and attended Westminster School before embarking on a career in the Royal Navy.

== Military career ==
Garlies entered the navy at an early age, serving as a 13-year-old midshipman under the command of his uncle, Commodore Keith Stewart at the Battle of Dogger Bank in August 1781, and also in the Great Siege of Gibraltar in 1782. In 1789 he was promoted to lieutenant, serving in the frigate Aquilon in the Mediterranean. He returned to England in early 1790, when appointed commander of the fire ship Vulcan. He was promoted to post-captain on 30 April 1793, and soon after was appointed to the frigate Winchelsea, serving in the West Indies, and being wounded while covering the landing of the army at Guadaloupe in April 1794, and was then sent with detachments of troops to accept the surrender of the islands of Marie-Galante and La Désirade.

In 1795 he took command of the frigate Lively, and took Sir John Jervis out from England to assume command in the Mediterranean. Commanding a division of four frigates and a sloop, he engaged the Spanish ship of line San Francisco de Asís in the action of 25 January 1797, in which he was forced to withdraw. He served in the area until the Battle of Cape St Vincent in February 1797. After the battle Lively carried Sir Robert Calder, with the account of the victory, and Lord Minto, Viceroy of Corsica, and his suite, who were on board during the battle, back to England.

Around November 1799 Garlies commissioned the frigate Hussar, and commanded her in the Channel and on the coast of Ireland until early 1801, making several captures and recaptures:

- On 17 May 1800 Hussar, the frigate Loire and the schooner Milbrook recaptured the ship Princess Charlotte, and captured the French schooner La Francoise.
- On 2 March 1801 Hussar captured the French schooner Le General Bessieres.
- On 12 April 1801 Hussar recaptured the ship James of Liverpool.

In early 1801 Garlies moved into the Bellerophon, to serve on the blockade of Brest, remaining there until the Treaty of Amiens in early 1802 brought a short-lived period of peace. Following the renewal of hostilities in May 1803 he commanded the ship Ajax, and sat on the Board of Admiralty in between May 1805 and February 1806. Galloway saw no further active service, but was promoted to Rear-Admiral on 31 July 1810; to Vice Admiral on 12 August 1819; and to Admiral on 22 July 1830.

== Political career ==
Apart from his military career Garlies also sat as a Member of Parliament. He was first elected in 1790 for the constituency of Saltash, and served until vacating his seat in favour of his brother William in February 1795. He returned to Parliament when elected MP for Cockermouth on 22 July 1805, and then sat for Haslemere after the 1806 election, but was shortly after obliged to quit his seat following the death of his father on 13 November, when he became the Earl of Galloway, and moved to the House of Lords.

He served as Lord Lieutenant of Kirkcudbright from 26 December 1794 to 1807, and from 1820 to 1828, and of Wigtownshire from 28 March 1807 to 1828. On 30 May 1814 he was invested as a member of the Order of the Thistle. He also served as vice-president of the Board of Agriculture in 1815.

== Family ==
In April 1797 he married Lady Jane Paget, the daughter of Henry Paget, 1st Earl of Uxbridge, and sister of Henry Paget, 1st Marquess of Anglesey. They had eight children:

1. Lady Jane Stewart (1798–1844), m. George Spencer-Churchill, 6th Duke of Marlborough.
2. Lady Caroline Stewart (1799–1857)
3. Hon Randolph Stewart, later 9th Earl of Galloway (1800–1873)
4. Lady Louisa Stewart (1804–1889), m. William Duncombe, 2nd Baron Feversham.
5. Hon Arthur Stewart (1805–1806)
6. Hon Alan Stewart (1807–1808)
7. Lady Helen Stewart (1810–1813)
8. Vice Admiral Hon Keith Stewart CB (1814– 15 September 1879), m. Mary FitzRoy, daughter of Charles Augustus FitzRoy. Had issue, 9 daughters, and 1 son.

Parliament of Great Britain
Preceded by Charles Ambler; John Lemon	Member of Parliament for Saltash; 1790–1795; With: Edward Bearcroft	Succeeded by Edward Bearcroft; Hon. William Stewart
Parliament of the United Kingdom
Preceded by Robert Plumer Ward; James Graham	Member of Parliament for Cockermouth; 1805–1806; With: Robert Plumer Ward	Succeeded by James Graham; John Lowther
Preceded by George Wood; Richard Penn	Member of Parliament for Haslemere; 1806; With: Charles Long	Succeeded by Charles Long; Robert Plumer Ward
Honorary titles
Preceded by ?	Lord Lieutenant of Kirkcudbright; 1794–1803	Succeeded by The Earl of Galloway
Preceded by The Earl of Selkirk	Lord Lieutenant of Kirkcudbright; 1820–1828	Succeeded by The Earl of Galloway
Preceded by The Earl of Galloway	Lord Lieutenant of Wigtownshire; 1807–1828	Succeeded by The Earl of Galloway
Peerage of Scotland
Preceded by John Stewart	Earl of Galloway; 1806–1834	Succeeded by Randolph Stewart
