= Marianne Spencer Stanhope Hudson =

Marianne Spencer Stanhope Hudson was an English novelist. She published a silver-fork novel, titled Almack's, in 1826.

== Biography ==
Hudson was born in 1786. She was the second child and eldest daughter of Walter Spencer-Stanhope of Cannon Hall and his wife Mary Winifred. Her father was an industrialist and politician. She married Robert Hudson of Tadworth Court in 1828.

== Almack's ==
Hudson published the novel the Almack's: A Society Novel of the Times of George IV with the publishers Saunders and Otley in 1826. It was published anonymously, but is now generally attributed to Hudson. At least three editions of the novel were published.

Almack's is a silver-fork novel, set in the Georgian era of the early nineteenth century during the reign of King George IV. The title of the novel likely refers to the Almack's social clubs in London. Like several other silver-fork novels, Almack's made reference to the fashionable Persian ambassador, Mirza Abul Hassan Khan.
