= Sir Henry Fletcher, 1st Baronet, of Clea Hall =

British politician

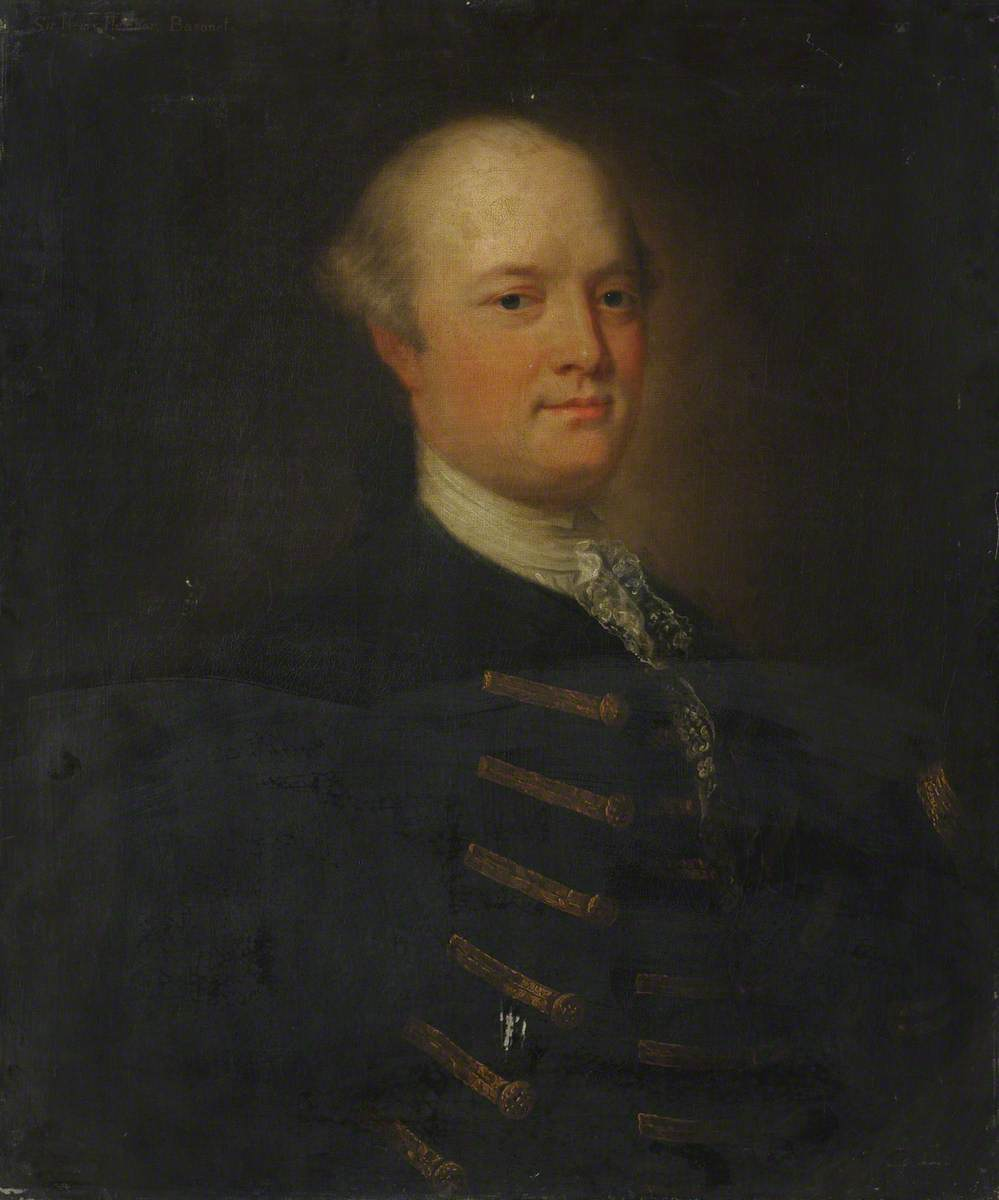
Did Henry Fletcher Portrait

Commander Sir Henry Fletcher, 1st Baronet of Clea Hall (1727 – 29 March 1807) was an MP for Cumberland in the Parliament of Great Britain between 1768 and 1800, and in the Parliament of the United Kingdom between 1801 and 1802.

Born Henry Fletcher in circa 1727 he was the son of John Fletcher and Isabella Senhouse. In 1759 he gained the rank of Commander in the service of the Honourable East India Company and was a director of the Honourable East India Company between 1766 and 1784. He established the family seat at Ashley Park, Walton-on-Thames, Surrey.

He was created a Baronet of Clea Hall in 1782.

He was married to Catherine Lintot and they had two children, Catherine and Henry, who succeeded as baronet.

== Arms ==
Coat of arms of Sir Henry Fletcher, 1st Baronet, of Clea Hall
| Crest A horse's head argent charged with a trefoil gules. Escutcheon Sable, a cross engrailed argent, between four plates, each charged with an arrow of the first. Motto Martis non Cupidinis (Belonging to Mars, not Cupid) |

Parliament of Great Britain
| Preceded by Sir James Lowther; Henry Curwen | Member of Parliament for Cumberland; 1768–1801; With: Henry Curwen 1768–1774; Sir James Lowther 1774–1784; Sir William Lowther 1784–1790; Humphrey Senhouse 1790–1796; John Lowther 1796–1801 | Succeeded by Parliament of the United Kingdom |
Parliament of the United Kingdom
| Preceded by Parliament of Great Britain | Member of Parliament for Cumberland; 1801–1802; With: John Lowther | Succeeded by John Lowther; Viscount Morpeth |
Baronetage of Great Britain
| New creation | Baronet (of Clea Hall); 1782–1807 | Succeeded by Henry Fletcher |
