= Sir James Graham, 1st Baronet, of Kirkstall =

British Tory politician

Sir James Graham, 1st Baronet (18 November 1753 – 21 March 1825) was a British Tory politician.

He was elected as a Member of Parliament (MP) for Cockermouth at the 1802 general election, but resigned that seat in 1805 to stand for Wigtown Burghs, where he was elected in July 1805.

At the 1806 general election he was returned as an MP for Cockermouth, where he was re-elected in 1807 and held the seat until 1812. At the 1812 general election he was returned for Carlisle, and held that seat until his death in 1825, aged 71.

In 1781, James married Anne Moore (1762-1821), daughter of Thomas Moore. They had three sons and two daughters, of whom two children survived him : Sandford, who succeeded to the title and Anne, who married Adolphus Dalrymple, 2nd Baronet, of High Mark.

He was made a baronet in 1808, of Kirkstall, Yorkshire.

Parliament of the United Kingdom
Preceded by John Baynes Garforth; Walter Spencer-Stanhope	Member of Parliament for Cockermouth; 1802 – 1805; With: Robert Plumer Ward	Succeeded by Viscount Garlies; Robert Plumer Ward
Preceded by William Stewart	Member of Parliament for Wigtown Burghs; 1805 – 1806	Succeeded by Edward Richard Stewart
Preceded by Viscount Garlies; Robert Plumer Ward	Member of Parliament for Cockermouth; 1806 – 1812; With: John Lowther 1806 – Jan 1807; Lord Binning Jan 1807 – May 1807; John Lowther May 1807 – Jul 1807; John Osborn Jul 1807–1808; Viscount Lowther from 1808	Succeeded by John Lowther; Viscount Lowther
Preceded by Walter Spencer-Stanhope; John Christian Curwen	Member of Parliament for Carlisle; 1812 – 1825; With: Henry Fawcett 1812–16; John Christian Curwen 1816–20; William James 1820–26	Succeeded by Sir Philip Musgrave, Bt; William James
Baronetage of the United Kingdom
New creation	Baronet (of Kirkstall); 1808–1825	Succeeded by Sandford Graham
