= Sir Michael le Fleming, 4th Baronet =

British politician

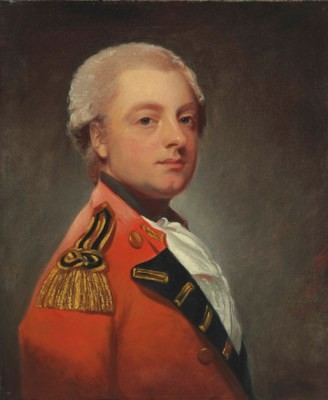
Sir Michael le Fleming, 4th Baronet

Sir Michael le Fleming, 4th Baronet (1748–1806) was a British politician who sat in the House of Commons for 32 years from 1774 to 1806.

Fleming was the only son of Sir William Fleming, 3rd Baronet of Rydal, Westmorland, and his wife Elizabeth Petyt, daughter of Christopher Petyt of Skipton, Yorkshire and was born on 10 December 1748. His father died on 31 March 1757 and he succeeded to the baronetcy aged nine. Sir James Lowther became his ward. Fleming was educated at Eton College from 1760 to 1765. In 1770 he became High Sheriff of Cumberland and in 1779 was appointed Lieutenant-colonel in the Westmorland Militia.

At the 1774 general election Fleming was returned as Member of Parliament for Westmorland jointly with Sir James Lowther after a contest. In parliament he followed Lowther in his politics and made little impression. He was returned unopposed in 1780, 1784, 1790, 1796 and 1802.

Fleming was described as “a most abandoned profligate.” However, his friend James Boswell described him as “a very fashionable baronet in the brilliant world, who had a great love of literature”. Fleming married Lady Diana Howard, daughter of Thomas Howard, 14th Earl of Suffolk on 23 November 1782, but in 1793 she was said to be on the verge of leaving him. He died on 19 May 1806. He was succeeded in the baronetcy by his cousin Sir Daniel Fleming who married Anne, his only legitimate daughter.

Parliament of Great Britain
Preceded by John Robinson; Thomas Fenwick	Member of Parliament for Westmorland; 1774– 1806; With: Sir James Lowther 1774–1775; James Lowther 1775–1806	Succeeded by James Lowther; The Lord Muncaster
Baronetage of England
Preceded by William Fleming	Baronet (of Rydal); 1757-1806	Succeeded by Daniel Fleming
