= Humphrey Senhouse (politician) =

Humphrey Senhouse (1731–1814) was a British Tory politician from a Cumberland family.

He was the eldest son of Humphrey Senhouse (1705–1770), a landowner and High Sheriff who had founded the port of Maryport, and the heiress Mary, daughter of Sir George Fleming, Bt, Bishop of Carlisle.

Humphrey junior was elected at a by-election in 1786 as a Member of Parliament (MP) for Cockermouth, which was generally regarded as a pocket borough. He held that seat until the 1790 general election, when he was returned as an MP for Cumberland. He did not contest the seat at the 1796 general election

He had married in 1768 Catherine, the daughter of Thomas Wood, of Beadnell, Northumberland; they had one surviving child, another Humphrey.

Parliament of Great Britain
Preceded by John Lowther; James Clarke Satterthwaite	Member of Parliament for Cockermouth; 1786 – 1790; With: James Clarke Satterthwaite	Succeeded by John Baynes Garforth; John Anstruther
Preceded by Sir William Lowther, Bt; Sir Henry Fletcher, Bt	Member of Parliament for Cumberland; 1790 – 1796; With: Sir Henry Fletcher, Bt	Succeeded by John Lowther; Sir Henry Fletcher, Bt
