= Richard Penn (governor) =

British politician (1735–1811)

Acting Governor of Pennsylvania
- In office Late 1771 – 1773
- Preceded by: John Penn (remained in office during Richard Penn's tenure)

Lieutenant Governor of Pennsylvania
- In office 1771–1773

President of the Board at the University of Pennsylvania
- In office 1773–1774

Member of the British Parliament
- In office 1784–1791
- In office 1796–1802

Personal details
- Born: 1735 England, Kingdom of Great Britain
- Died: 27 May 1811 (aged 75–76) Richmond, England, Kingdom of Great Britain

Richard Penn Jr. (1735 – 27 May 1811) served as the lieutenant governor of the Province of Pennsylvania from 1771 to 1773, and was later as a member of the British Parliament from 1784 to 1791.

== Early life and education ==
Penn, of Laleham in Middlesex, was the second son of Richard Penn Sr. (1706–1771) and his wife Hannah Lardner, daughter of Richard Lardner M.D.; and the grandson of William Penn, the founder of the colonial-era Province of Pennsylvania. He was educated at Eton College and St John's College at the University of Cambridge before joining the Inner Temple.

== Career ==
=== Province of Pennsylvania ===
In 1763, Penn and his brother John visited the colonial-era Province of Pennsylvania, where his family were sole proprietors. He was qualified as a councilor on 12 January 1764. In 1768, he was elected as a member of the American Philosophical Society.

In 1771, Penn returned to Pennsylvania and was appointed lieutenant governor. He later became acting governor when his brother returned to England to manage the colony's legal interests. Richard Penn was popular with in the province and took care of the commercial interests of the province, but less so with his uncle, the proprietor. After two years, he was replaced as governor by his brother.

=== American Revolutionary War ===
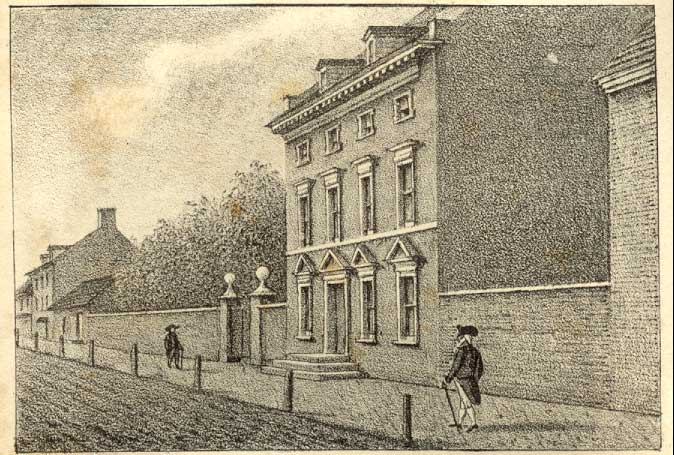
President's House in Philadelphia, which later served as the presidential mansion for George Washington and John Adams between 1790 and 1800

In 1772, Penn was elected a trustee of the College and Academy of Philadelphia, which is now the University of Pennsylvania, and served as president of its board from 1773 to 1774.

After the American Revolutionary War commenced in 1775, he retired, and the Second Continental Congress charged him with delivering the Olive Branch Petition to the King George III that summer. George III, however, refused to accept the petition, but Penn met with the House of Lords to discuss the views of the Thirteen Colonies on independence.

After the conclusion of the Revolutionary War, he was compensated by the U.S. government for his loss of his proprietary rights in Pennsylvania, and he visited Philadelphia again in 1808. James Boswell, who was his friend, recorded in 1789 that Earl of Lonsdale urged the government to appoint Penn as Britain's first Ambassador to the United States, though he was not appointed.

=== British Parliament ===
In 1784, Penn entered Parliament as a member for Appleby, elected on the Lonsdale interest, and subsequently also represented two other Lonsdale-dominated boroughs, Haslemere and Lancaster. He was a reliable supporter of Pitt's government (breaking with the other Lonsdale-backed members to support Pitt over the Regency crisis in 1788–89), but rarely if ever spoke in the House of Commons. He resigned his seat in 1791, but returned to Parliament at the next general election, in 1796.

== Personal life ==
On 21 May 1772, Penn married Mary "Polly" Masters, daughter of the late William Masters of Philadelphia, at Christ Church in Philadelphia. The bride's mother gave them a splendid city house as a wedding present. Penn entertained members of the Continental Congress at his house in Center City Philadelphia, including First Continental Congress delegate George Washington.

Richard and Polly Penn had two sons, William Penn (1776–1845) and Richard Penn, FRS (1784–1863), and two daughters, Hannah, who died, and Mary who married Samuel Paynter; Polly died in 1829.

== President's House ==
Penn sold his Philadelphia city house to Robert Morris in 1785. From 1790 to 1800, while Philadelphia was the temporary capital of the United States, it served as the executive mansion for Presidents George Washington and John Adams until the national capital moved to Washington, D.C., in November 1800.

== Death ==
Penn died on 27 May 1811 in Richmond-on-Thames.

== Notes ==
Parliament of Great Britain
| Preceded by Hon. William Pitt; Philip Honywood | Member of Parliament for Appleby; 1784–1790; With: Hon. John Leveson Gower | Succeeded by Hon. Robert Jenkinson; Richard Ford |
| Preceded by William Gerard Hamilton; James Lowther | Member of Parliament for Haslemere; 1790–1791; With: William Gerard Hamilton | Succeeded by William Gerard Hamilton; James Clarke Satterthwaite |
| Preceded by John Dent; Sir George Warren | Member of Parliament for Lancaster; 1796–1800; With: John Dent | Succeeded by Parliament of the United Kingdom |
Parliament of the United Kingdom
| Preceded by Parliament of Great Britain | Member of Parliament for Lancaster; 1801–1802; With: John Dent | Succeeded by Marquess of Douglas; John Dent |
| Preceded by George Wood; James Clarke Satterthwaite | Member of Parliament for Haslemere; 1802–1806; With: George Wood | Succeeded by Viscount Garlies; Charles Long |
