= William Gerard Hamilton =

British politician

The Right Honourable William Gerard Hamilton PC (Ire)
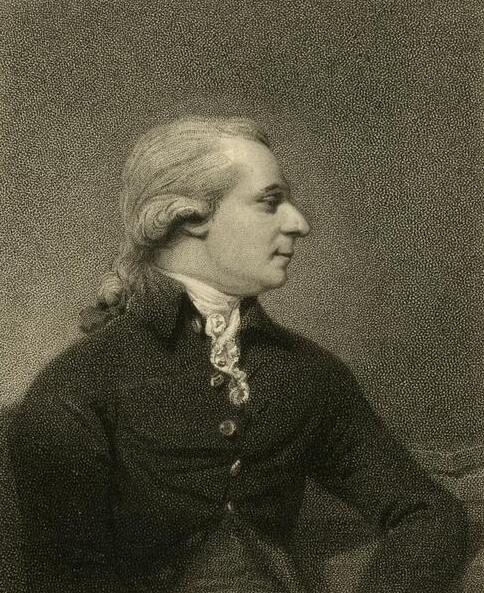

Member of Parliament
- In office 1754–1796
- Constituency: Haslemere (1790–1796); Wilton (1780–1790); Wareham (1774–1780); Old Sarum (1768–1774); Pontefract (1761–1768); Petersfield (1754–1761)

Chancellor of the Exchequer of Ireland
- In office 1763–1784
- Preceded by: Lord Yorke
- Succeeded by: John Foster

Chief Secretary for Ireland
- In office 1761–1764

Member of Parliament for Killybegs
- In office 1761–1768

Personal details
- Born: 28 January 1729 London, England
- Died: 16 July 1796 (aged 67) London, England
- Resting place: St Martin-in-the-Fields,
- Education: Winchester College
- Alma mater: Oriel College, Oxford

William Gerard Hamilton (28 January 1729 – 16 July 1796), was a British politician, popularly known as "Single Speech Hamilton".

== Biography ==
He was born in London, the son of William Hamilton, a Scottish bencher of Lincoln's Inn, and succeeded his father in 1754. He was educated at Winchester, Lincoln's Inn and Oriel College, Oxford. With his father's fortune he entered political life and became Member of Parliament for Petersfield in Hampshire. His maiden speech, delivered on 13 November 1755, during the debate on the address, which excited Horace Walpole's admiration, is generally supposed to have been his only effort in the House of Commons. But the nickname "Single Speech" is undoubtedly misleading, and Hamilton is known to have spoken with success on other occasions, both in the House of Commons and in the Irish parliament.

=== Political offices ===
In 1756 he was appointed one of the commissioners for trade and plantations, and in 1761 he became chief secretary to Lord Halifax, the Lord Lieutenant of Ireland, as well as MP of the Irish House of Commons for Killybegs (until 1768) and English MP for Pontefract.

He was appointed Irish Chancellor of the Exchequer in 1763, and subsequently filled various other administrative offices. Hamilton was thought very highly of by Samuel Johnson, and it is certain that he was strongly opposed to the British taxation of America. He was close to the Prince Regent, serving as a trusted adviser. In 1784 he exchanged his office as Chancellor of the Exchequer for a pension of £2,000 p.a. Hamilton had held the office for over 20 years, although had treated the role as a largely ceremonial position. He was succeeded by John Foster, who went on to bring in changes credited with greatly boosting the rural Irish economy.

=== Ill health and death ===
He suffered from a severe paralytic stroke in the winter of 1791–92. This had not been his first, and by August 1792 he remained in a poor state. On 4 March 1793 he received a leave of absence from the House of Commons due to his ill health. He died in London on 16 July 1796, and was buried in the chancel vault of St Martins-in-the-Fields. His death came "just in time to save him from absolute poverty." He was unmarried.

Two of his speeches in the Irish House of Commons, and some other miscellaneous works—including previously unpublished notes on the Corn Laws by Johnson—were published by Edmond Malone after his death under the title Parliamentary Logick.

Parliament of Ireland
Preceded by Henry Gore; Francis Pierpoint Burton	Member of Parliament for Killybegs; 1761–1768; With: Richard Jones	Succeeded by Henry Hamilton; Thomas Allan
Parliament of Great Britain
Preceded by John Jolliffe; William Conolly	Member of Parliament for Petersfield; 1754–1761; With: John Jolliffe 1754; William Beckford 1754; Sir John Philipps 1754–1761	Succeeded by John Jolliffe; Richard Pennant
Preceded by Sambrooke Freeman; The Viscount Galway	Member of Parliament for Pontefract; 1761–1768; With: The Viscount Galway	Succeeded by The Viscount Galway; Sir Rowland Winn
Preceded by Howell Gwynne; Thomas Pitt	Member of Parliament for Old Sarum; 1768–1774; With: John Craufurd	Succeeded by Pinckney Wilkinson; Thomas Pitt
Preceded by Robert Palk; Thomas de Grey	Member of Parliament for Wareham; 1774–1780; With: Christopher D'Oyly	Succeeded by John Boyd; Thomas Farrer
Preceded by Henry Herbert; Charles Herbert	Member of Parliament for Wilton; 1780–1790; With: Lord Herbert 1780–1785, 1788–1790; Philip Goldsworthy 1785–1788	Succeeded by Lord Herbert; The Viscount FitzWilliam
Preceded by John Baynes-Garforth; John Lowther	Member of Parliament for Haslemere; 1790–1796; With: James Lowther 1790; Richard Penn 1790–1791; James Clarke Satterthwaite 1791–1796	Succeeded by James Clarke Satterthwaite; James Lowther
Political offices
Preceded by Richard Rigby	Chief Secretary for Ireland; 1761–1764	Succeeded by The Earl of Drogheda
Preceded by Sir William Yorke	Chancellor of the Exchequer of Ireland; 1763–1784	Succeeded by John Foster
