= Edward Norton (MP) =

British politician

Edward Norton (11 March 1750 – March 1786) was a British lawyer and politician who sat in the House of Commons from 1782 to 1786.

Norton was the fourth son of Fletcher Norton, and his wife Grace Chapple, daughter of Sir William Chapple, and was born on 11 March 1750. He matriculated at University College, Oxford in 1766. He was admitted at Middle Temple in 1772 and was called to the bar in 1775.

Norton was returned unopposed as Member of Parliament for Haslemere on Sir James Lowther's interest at the 1780 general election. At the 1784 general election he was returned unopposed for Carlisle, again on Lowther's interest. He voted but did not speak in Parliament.

Norton died unmarried in March 1786. It was said he was exhausted after acting as chief agent for Lowther at the Lancaster by-election. He had brothers William, Chapple and Fletcher who were also Members of Parliament.

Parliament of Great Britain
Preceded by Peter Burrell; Sir Merrick Burrell, Bt	Member of Parliament for Haslemere; 1780–1784; With: Sir James Lowther 1780; Walter Spencer Stanhope 1780–1784	Succeeded by Thomas Postlethwaite; John Baynes Garforth
Preceded by Earl of Surrey; William Lowther	Member of Parliament for Carlisle; 1784–1786; With: Earl of Surrey	Succeeded by Earl of Surrey; John Lowther
