= John Bellasis (East India Company officer) =

Major-General John Bellasis (16 July 1743 – 11 February 1808) was a British officer who was commanding the forces at Bombay.

== Early life ==
Bellasis was born on 16 July 1743 at Long Marton, Westmorland (now Cumbria). He was a son of Joseph Bellasis (1691–1766) and Margaret (née Hill) Bellasis (d. 1787). His elder brother, the Rev. George Bellasis, rector of Yattendon, Berkshire, was father to Gen. Joseph Harvey Bellasis of the Indian Army.

== Career ==
Bellasis first went to India in 1763. He began his military service with the East India Company in 1769 and eventually became Major-General commanding the British forces at Bombay.

== Personal life ==
On 3 June 1776, Bellasis was married to Ann Martha Hutchins, daughter of John Hutchins and Anne (née Stephens) Hutchins (a daughter of Thomas Stephens, rector of Pimperne, Dorset). Before her death in Bombay in 1797, they lived at Randall Lodge and were the parents of one daughter and five sons, including:

- Helen Hutchins Bellasis (1777–1840), who married Henry Fawcett, MP for Grampound and Carlisle, in 1794. After his death in 1816, she married Barrington Tristram.
- George Hutchins Bellasis (1778–1822), a noted amateur artist; he married Charlotte Maude, youngest daughter of Joseph Maude, of Kendal, in 1805.
- Daniel Hutchins Bellasis (1785–1836), a Colonel of Infantry in the Bombay Army; he married Mary Tadman, a daughter of Lance Tadman of New House, Gravesend, Kent.
- John Hutchins Belasis (1792–1837), who married Ellen Maria Ashman.

He died, suddenly, in Bombay on 11 February 1808 at age 64.
