= William Lowther, 1st Earl of Lonsdale =

British politician

The Right Honourable The Earl of Lonsdale KG
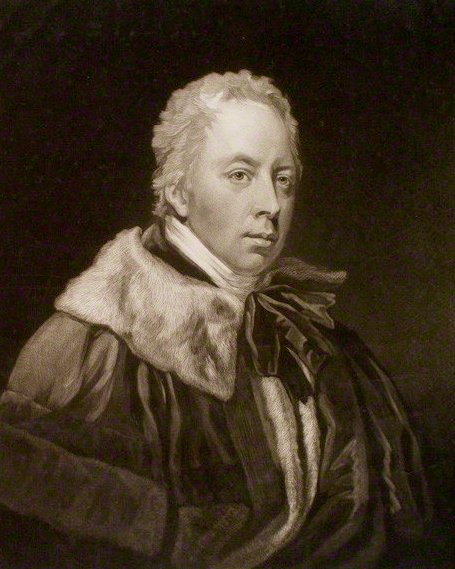
- Portrait of The Earl of Lonsdale, 1806, by Samuel William Reynolds (after John Opie)

Member of Parliament for Rutland
- In office 1801–1802 Serving with Gerard Noel Edwards
- Preceded by: Union of Great Britain and Ireland
- Succeeded by: Gerard Noel Edwards; The Lord Carbery
- In office 1796–1801 Serving with Gerard Noel Edwards
- Preceded by: Gerard Noel Edwards; Lord Sherard
- Succeeded by: Union of Great Britain and Ireland

Member of Parliament for Cumberland
- In office 1784–1790 Serving with Sir Henry Fletcher, Bt
- Preceded by: Sir Henry Fletcher, Bt; Sir James Lowther, Bt
- Succeeded by: Sir Henry Fletcher, Bt; Humphrey Senhouse

Member of Parliament for Carlisle
- In office 1780–1784 Serving with The Earl of Surrey
- Preceded by: Anthony Morris Storer; Walter Spencer Stanhope
- Succeeded by: The Earl of Surrey; Edward Norton

Member of Parliament for Appleby
- In office 1780–1781 Serving with Philip Honywood
- Preceded by: Philip Honywood; George Johnstone
- Succeeded by: Philip Honywood; William Pitt

Personal details
- Born: William Lowther; 29 December 1757
- Died: 19 March 1844 (aged 86) York House, Twickenham
- Party: Tory
- Spouse: Lady Augusta Fane (m. 1781; died 1838)
- Relations: Sir John Lowther, Bt (brother); Henry Zouch (uncle); Thomas Zouch (uncle); Henry Lowther, 3rd Earl of Lonsdale (grandson); William Lowther (grandson)
- Children: 6
- Parent(s): Sir William Lowther, 1st Baronet; Anne Zouch
- Education: Westminster School
- Alma mater: Trinity College, Cambridge

William Lowther, 1st Earl of Lonsdale, KG (29 December 1757 – 19 March 1844), also known as Sir William Lowther, 2nd Baronet, of Little Preston, from 1788 to 1802, and William Lowther, 2nd Viscount Lowther, from 1802 to 1807, was a British Tory politician and nobleman known for building Lowther Castle.

== Early life ==
Lowther was the eldest son of Rev. Sir William Lowther, 1st Baronet, of Little Preston and Swillington, and his wife Anne Zouch. His younger brother was Sir John Lowther, 1st Baronet, who also married a daughter of the 9th Earl of Westmorland. His father, an ordained priest who served as rector of Swillington from 1757 to 1788, inherited the estate of Swillington in 1763, upon the death of his first cousin Sir William Lowther, 2nd Baronet.

His father, a son of Christopher Lowther, was a grandson of Sir William Lowther. His maternal grandparents were Charles Zouch, vicar of Sandal Magna, and the former Dorothy Norton (daughter of Gervase Norton). Through his mother, his uncles were Henry and Thomas Zouch.

He was educated at Westminster, 1771, and Trinity College, Cambridge, 1776.

== Career ==
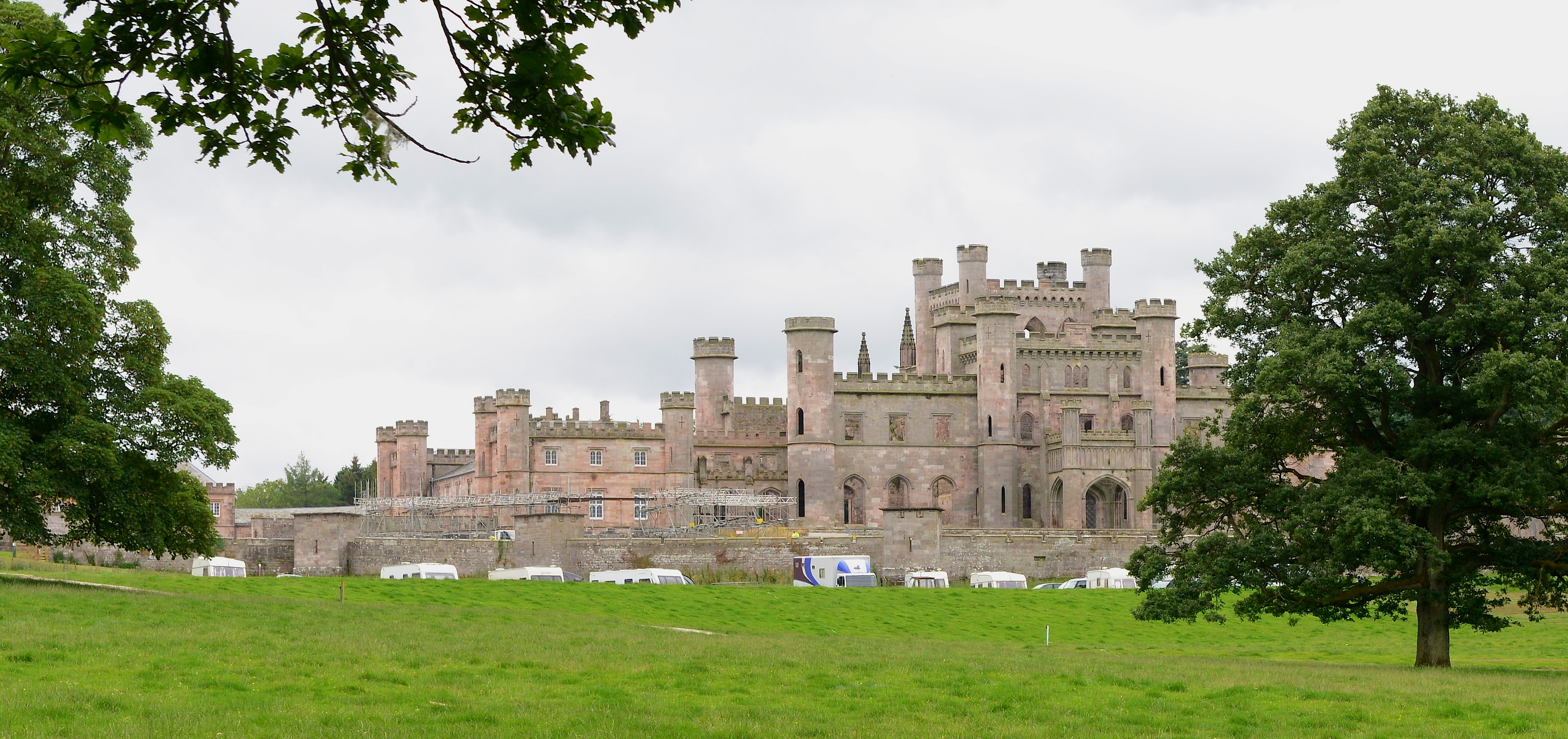
Lowther Castle

Like many members of the Lowther family, he followed the politics of his cousin, Sir James Lowther, 5th Baronet (later the 1st Earl of Lonsdale), but he seems to have shown a tendency towards independence. Lowther was briefly Member of Parliament for Appleby in 1780, for Carlisle from 1780 to 1784 and for Cumberland from 1784 to 1790. In 1796, he was returned as Member of Parliament for Rutland, holding the seat until 1802.

On 15 June 1788, he succeeded his father as the second baronet, of Little Preston. In 1802, he inherited by special remainder the titles of Viscount Lowther and Baron Lowther from his third cousin twice removed, the 1st Earl of Lonsdale of the first creation, as well as his immense estates. He was also appointed to the northern Lord Lieutenancies of Cumberland and Westmorland. In 1807, Lowther was himself created Earl of Lonsdale and appointed a Knight of the Garter.

A coal magnate, he spent £200,000 on the Lowther estate and built a new Lowther Castle. A Tory in politics, he seems to have been tolerant and well-liked, disdaining sabbatarianism and serving as patron for a number of painters and authors, including William Wordsworth.

== Personal life ==
On 12 July 1781, Lord Lonsdale was married to Lady Augusta Fane (1761–1838), the eldest daughter of John Fane, 9th Earl of Westmorland and, his first wife, Augusta Bertie (eldest daughter and co-heiress of Lord Montagu Bertie, fourth son, by his second wife, of Robert Bertie, 1st Duke of Ancaster and Kesteven). Together, they were the parents of six children:

- William Lowther, 2nd Earl of Lonsdale (1787–1872), who never married, but had at least three illegitimate children he acknowledged.
- Hon. Henry Cecil Lowther (1790–1867), who married Lady Lucy Eleanor Sherard, daughter of Philip Sherard, 5th Earl of Harborough.
- Lady Elizabeth Lowther (d. 1869), who died unmarried.
- Lady Mary Lowther (1785–1863), who married Maj.-Gen. Lord Frederick Cavendish-Bentinck, son of the 3rd Duke of Portland, on 16 September 1820. Lady Mary, an amateur artist, was tutored by Joseph Farington and Peter de Wint.
- Lady Anne Lowther (d. 1863), who married Sir John Beckett, 2nd Baronet on 20 January 1817.
- Lady Grace Caroline Lowther (d. 1883), who married William Vane, 3rd Duke of Cleveland on 3 July 1815.

Lowther also enjoyed fox hunting, serving as Master of the Cottesmore Hunt from 1788 to 1802 and 1806 to 1842.

Lord Lonsdale died at York House, Twickenham on 19 March 1844.

== Gallery ==
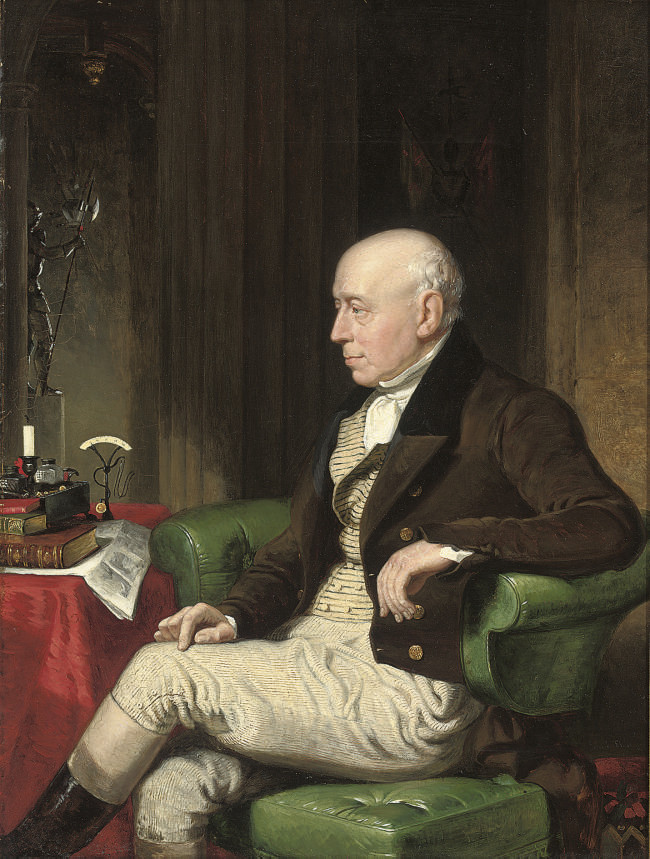
Portrait of Lord Lonsdale, by Jacob Thompson

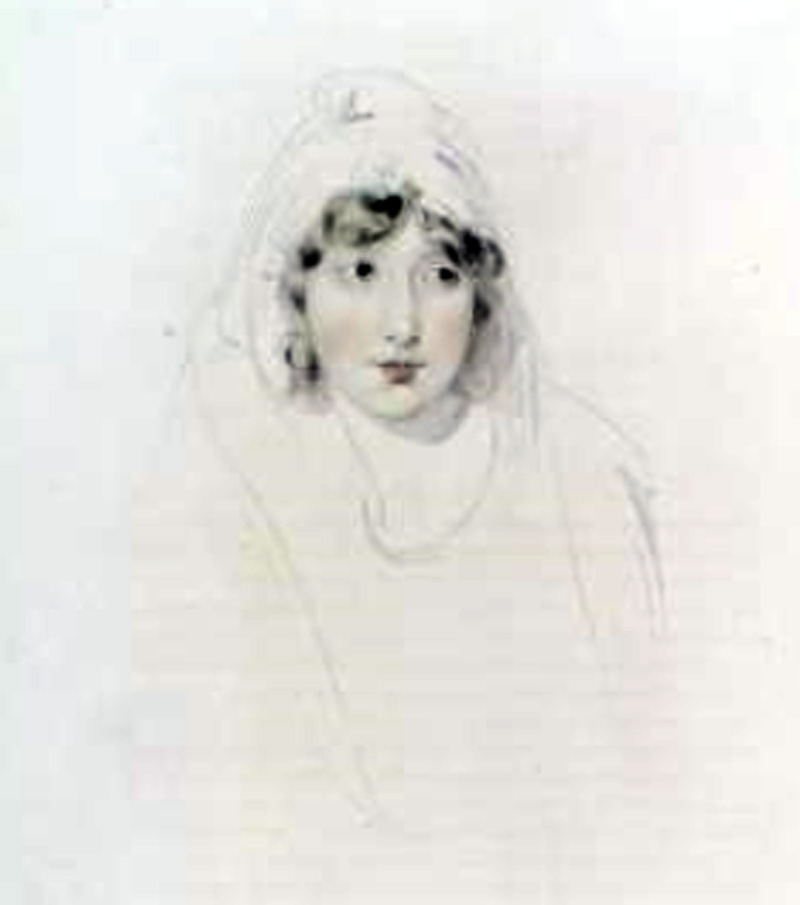
Drawing of his wife, Augusta, Countess of Lonsdale, by Sir Thomas Lawrence, 1837

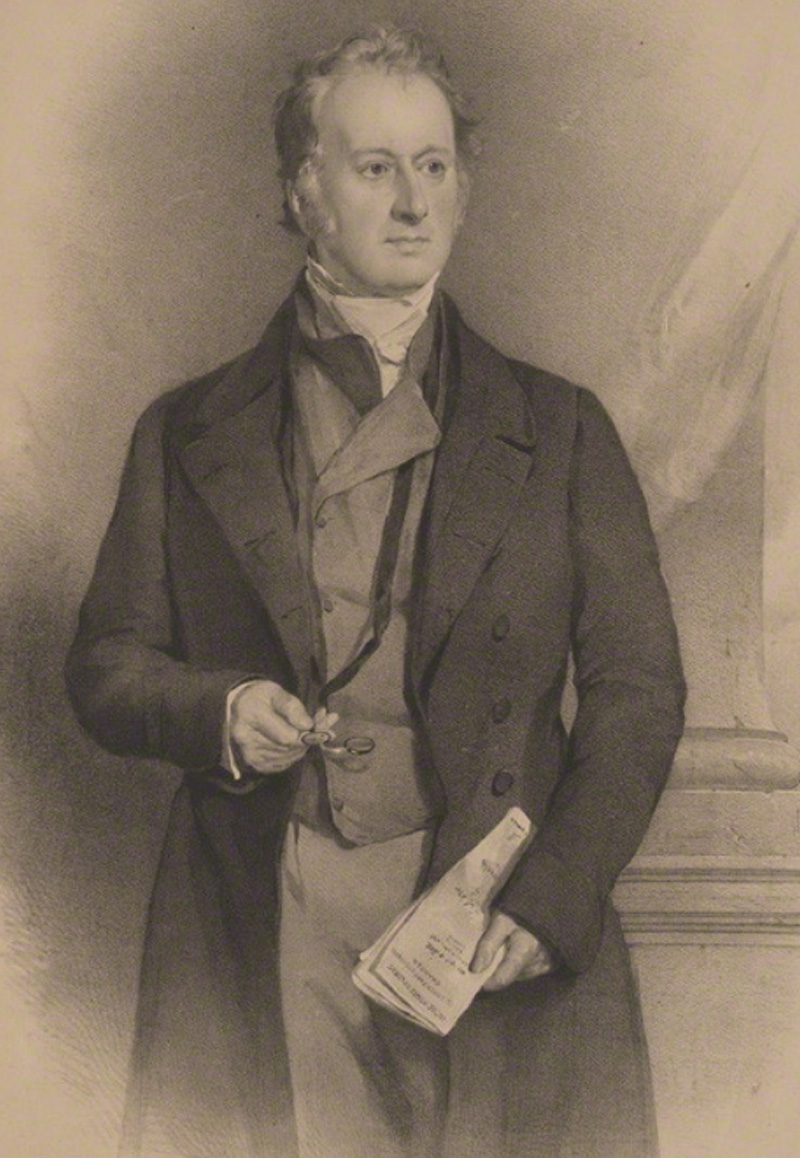
Lithography of his eldest son, William Lowther, 2nd Earl of Lonsdale, by Vincent Brooks

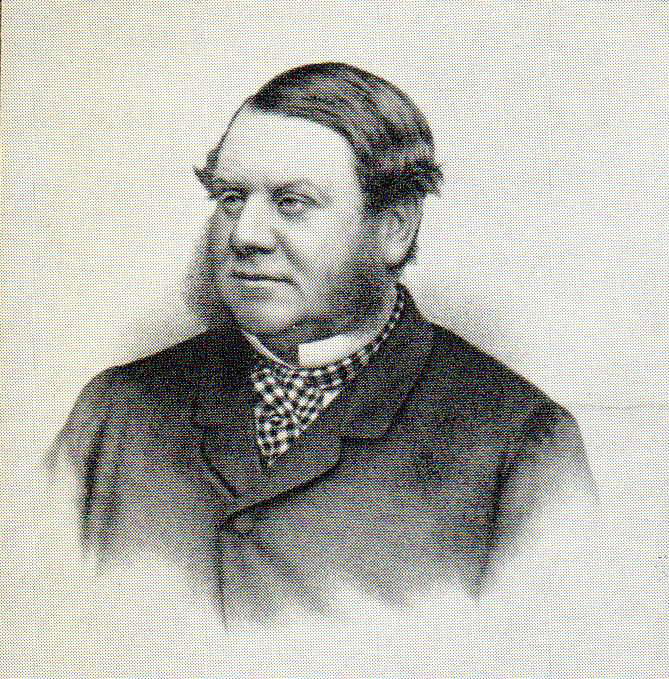
Portrait of his grandson, Henry Lowther, 3rd Earl of Lonsdale, c. 1870

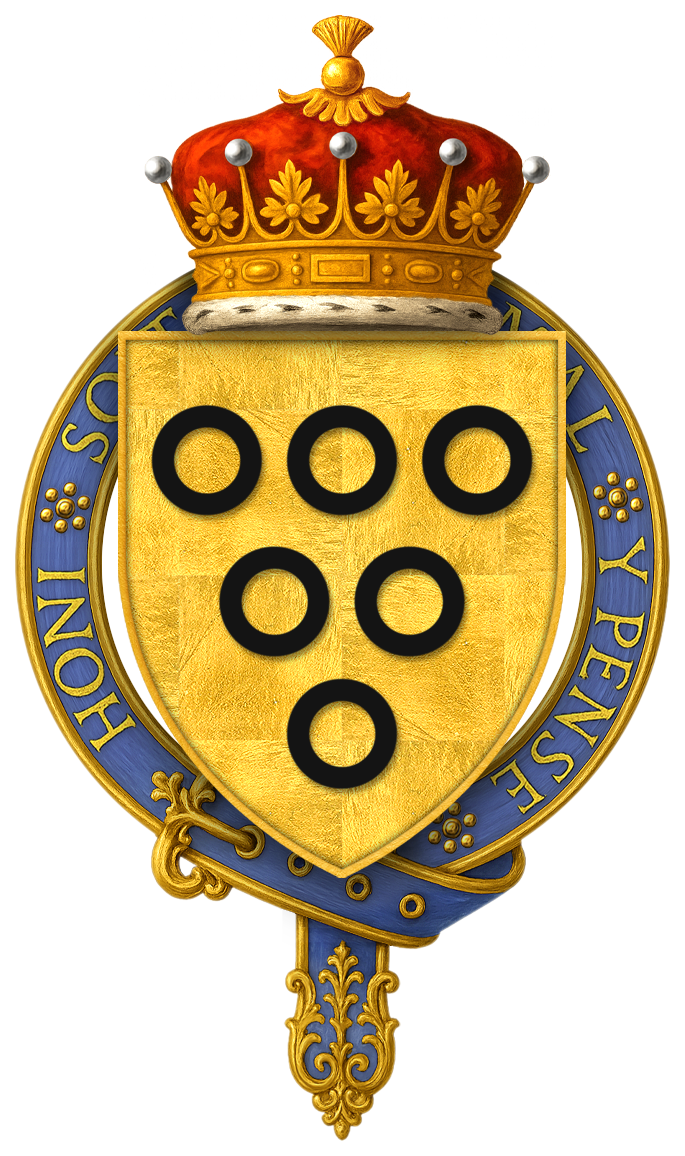
Lord Lonsdale's Shield of arms

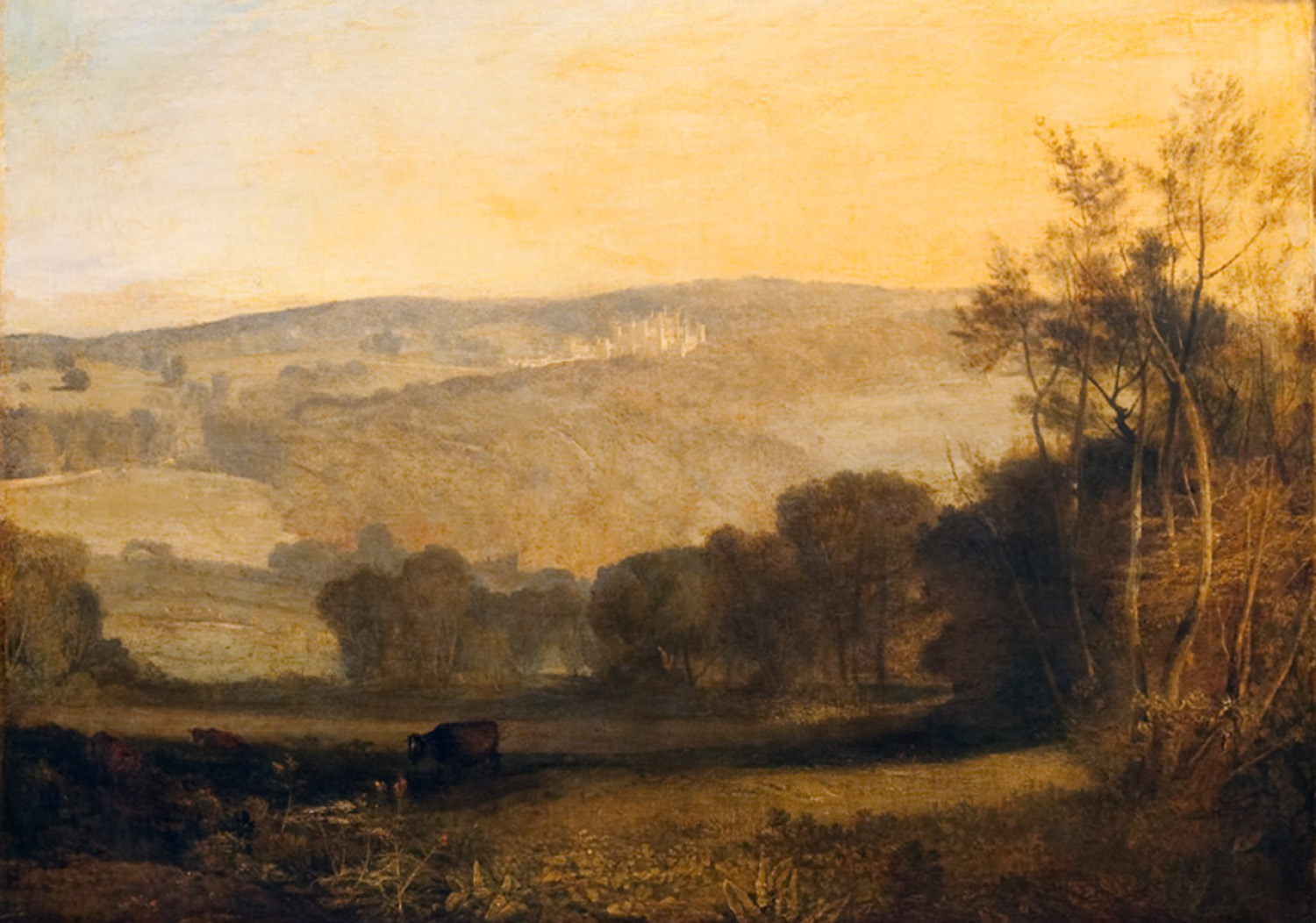
Painting of Lowther Castle at evening by J. M. W. Turner, 1810

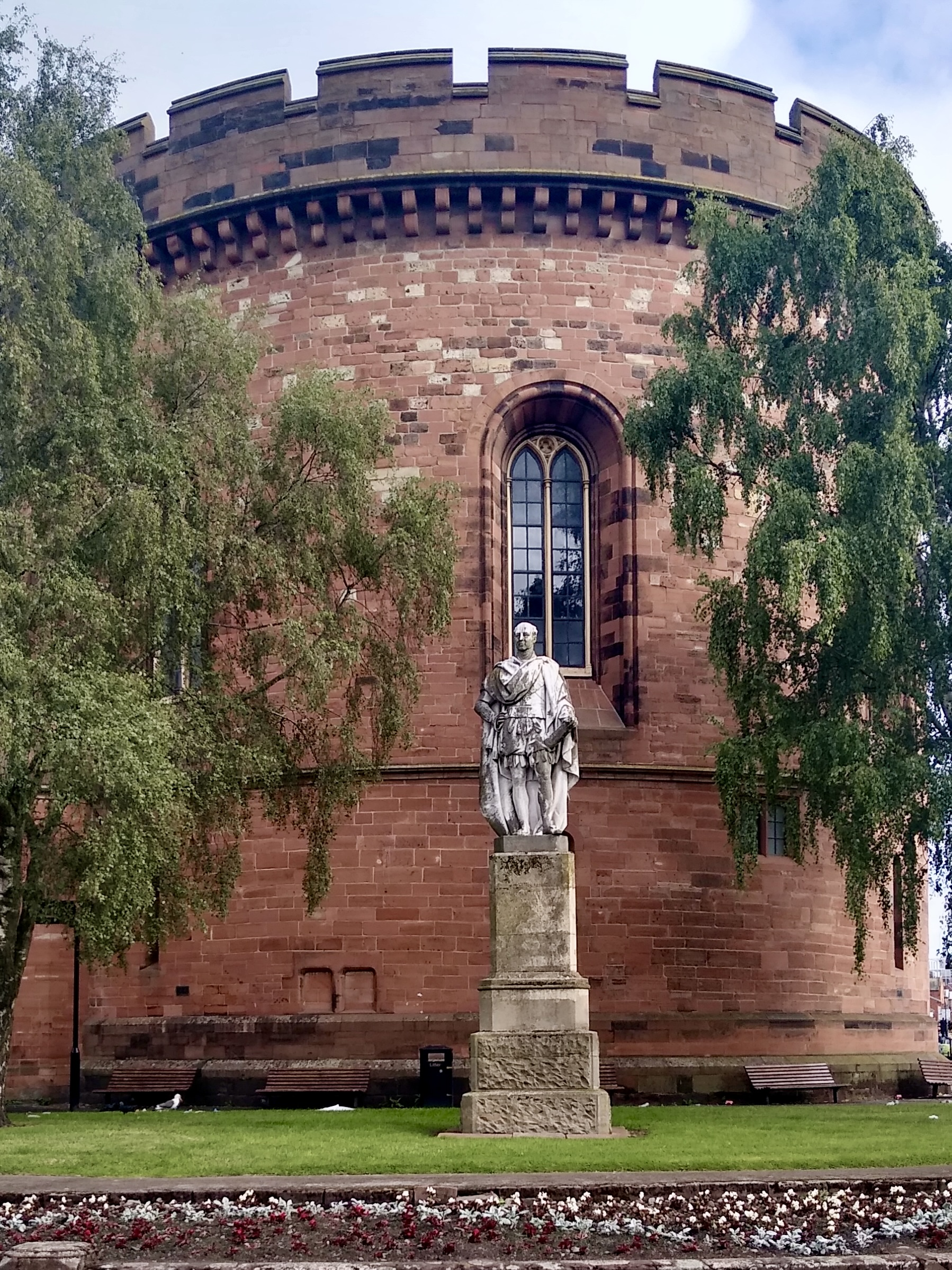
Statue (1845-6) of Lord Lonsdale by Musgrave Lewthwaite Watson at Carlisle Citadel

Parliament of Great Britain
Preceded by Philip Honywood; George Johnstone	Member of Parliament for Appleby; 1780–1781; With: Philip Honywood	Succeeded by Philip Honywood; William Pitt
Preceded by Anthony Morris Storer; Walter Spencer Stanhope	Member of Parliament for Carlisle; 1780–1784; With: Earl of Surrey	Succeeded by Earl of Surrey; Edward Norton
Preceded by Sir Henry Fletcher, Bt; Sir James Lowther, Bt	Member of Parliament for Cumberland; 1784–1790; With: Sir Henry Fletcher, Bt	Succeeded by Sir Henry Fletcher, Bt; Humphrey Senhouse
Preceded by Gerard Noel Edwards; Lord Sherard	Member of Parliament for Rutland; 1796–1800; With: Gerard Noel Edwards	Succeeded by (Union of Great Britain and Ireland)
Parliament of the United Kingdom
Preceded by (Union of Great Britain and Ireland)	Member of Parliament for Rutland; 1801–1802; With: Gerard Noel Edwards	Succeeded by Gerard Noel Edwards; The Lord Carbery
Honorary titles
Preceded by The Earl of Lonsdale	Lord Lieutenant of Cumberland and Westmorland; 1802–1844	Succeeded by The Earl of Lonsdale
Vacant Title last held by The Earl of Lonsdale	Vice-Admiral of Cumberland; 1809–1844	Vacant
Titles of nobility
New title	Earl of Lonsdale; 1807–1844	Succeeded by William Lowther
Preceded by James Lowther	Viscount Lowther; 1802–1844	Succeeded by William Lowther
Preceded by James Lowther	Baron Lowther (descended by acceleration); 1802–1841	Succeeded by William Lowther
Preceded by William Lowther	Baronet (of Little Preston); 1788–1844	Succeeded by William Lowther
