= Walter Spencer-Stanhope (1749–1822) =

British politician

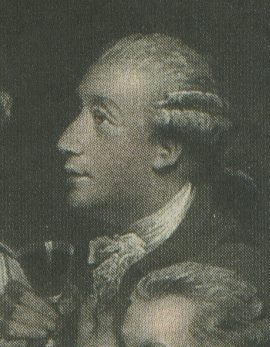
- Walter Spencer-Stanhope from The Dilettanti Society, after Joshua Reynolds
- Born: 4 February 1749
- Died: 10 April 1821
- Occupation: Politician
- Spouse: Mary Winifred Pulleine
- Children: John Spencer Stanhope, Marianne Spencer Stanhope Hudson

Walter Spencer-Stanhope (4 February 1749/50 – 10 April 1821), of Horsforth and Leeds, Yorkshire, was a British industrialist (whose family fortune had been made through the iron trade) and a politician who sat in the House of Commons for various constituencies between 1775 and 1812.

== Background and education ==
Spencer-Stanhope was born Stanhope, only surviving son of Walter Stanhope, one-time merchant of Leeds, and his second wife Ann Spencer, daughter of William Spencer of Cannon Hall. Church records show that he was born on 4 February 1749 (Old Style, corrected now to 1750) and baptized on 9 March of the same year. He was educated at Bradford Grammar School and went up to University College, Oxford, and later studied law at the Middle Temple, London. In 1775, Stanhope inherited Cannon Hall from his uncle, John Spencer, and changed his name from Stanhope to Spencer-Stanhope by Royal licence.

== Political career ==
Spencer-Stanhope was elected Member of Parliament (MP) for Carlisle in 1775, Haslemere in 1780, Hull, Yorkshire in 1784, for Cockermouth in 1800, and for Carlisle, Cumberland in 1802. He was a close supporter of William Pitt the Younger and friend of William Wilberforce, the anti-slavery campaigner, after meeting whom he became a religious philanthropist.

== Business career ==
As well as their interests in establishing the cotton industry in the late 17th century, the Spencer family were largely responsible for establishing the charcoal iron industry in the area between Leeds and Sheffield for the next 120 years.

== Family ==
Spencer-Stanhope married Mary Winifred, daughter of Thomas Babington Pulleine, on 21 Oct 1783, in Tynemouth, Northumberland, England. They had eight sons and seven daughters. Their son John Spencer-Stanhope was a Fellow of the Royal Society and the father of Walter Spencer-Stanhope and John Roddam Spencer Stanhope. Spencer-Stanhope died at his house in Langham Place, London, on 10 April 1821 (after a long illness) and was buried at the parish church in Cawthorne, South Yorkshire, England. His wife died on 16 December 1850 and was buried with him. In a family record, she recorded the births of their 15 children.

1. Walter Spencer Spencer-Stanhope was born on 26 Aug 1784 (baptized at Hosforth Chapel). He died on 26 Dec 1832.
2. Marianne Spencer-Stanhope was born in London (Grosvenor Square) on 23 May 1786.
3. John Spencer-Stanhope was born in London (Grosvenor Square) on 27 May 1787. His Godparents were the Earl of Chesterfield, Sir Mathew White Ridley, and Lady Glyn.
4. Anne Spencer-Stanhope was born at Cannon Hall on 7 Sep 1788. Her Godparents were the Countess of Burford, Mrs Marriott and Mr Pulleine.
5. Catherine Spencer-Stanhope was born at Cannon Hall on [??] September 1789 and was baptized on 18 Oct 1789. Her Godparents were Mrs Bigge, Mrs Anne Shafto and Colonel Glyn. She died on 20 Nov 1795 (of a Complaint in the Throat or Lungs) and was buried at Cawthorne Church. Her mother kept "a silken tress like spun sunshine" and labelled it "My dear little Catherine's hair, cut off the morning I lost her, November 20th, 1795."
6. Elizabeth Spencer-Stanhope was born on 5 Nov 1790. Her Godparents were Mrs Ord of Morpeth, Mrs Pulleine and Mr John Collingwood. She died on 15 Apr 1801 (of a truly agonizing but mercifully short illness reported simply as Obstruction) in Grosvenor Square, London, and was buried in St. James's Chapel, Hampstead Road.
7. Edward Spencer-Stanhope was born on 30 Oct 1791. His Godparents were Mr Collingwood, Mr Fawkes of Farnley and Mr Glyn.
8. William Spencer-Stanhope was born on 4 Jan 1793. His Godparents were Admiral Roddam, Mr Carr Ibbotson and Mrs Beaumont. He went "to Sea in the Ocean to join Lord Collingwood off Cadiz" in March 1806.
9. Thomas Henry Spencer-Stanhope was born on 14 May 1794. His Godparents were Lady Carr Glyn, Collingwood Roddam, Esquire, and Ashton Shuttleworth, Esquire. He died 3 Apr 1808 ("after a long and painful illness") and was "buried with Eliza in St James's Chapel in Hampstead Road". Known as HENRY to the family, the many family letters written during his illness clearly demonstrate how his mother denied herself to all her acquaintance and never left his side.
10. Charles Spencer-Stanhope was born on 14 Oct 1795. His Godparents were Colonel Beaumont, James Shuttleworth, Esquire, and Mrs Elizabeth Roddam. He was the Vicar of All Saints parish church at Cawthorne (a family living) for 52 years, until he died on 29 Oct 1874.
11. Isabella Spencer-Stanhope was born on 20 Oct 1797. Her Godparents were Mrs Roddam, Mrs Smith of Dorsetshire and Mr Smyth of Heath.
12. Philip Spencer-Stanhope was born on 25 Jan 1799. His Godparents were Mr Edwyn Stanhope, the Rev. John Smith of Westminster, and Lady Augusta Lowther.
13. Frances Mary Spencer-Stanhope was born in London (Grosvenor Square) on 27 Jun 1800. Her Godparents were Samuel Thornton, Esquire, Mrs Greame of Bridlington and Mrs Marriott of Horsmonden, Kent.
14. Maria Alicia Spencer-Stanhope was born at Cannon Hall on 4 Sep 1802. Her Godparents were the Rev. D. Marriott, Mrs Henry Pulleine of Carlton and Mrs Morland of Court Lodge, Kent.
15. Hugh Spencer-Stanhope was born on 30 Sep 1804. His Godparents were Edward Collingwood, Esquire, Mr Smith of Dorsetshire and Lady Elizabeth Lowther of Swillington.

== See also ==
- Spencer-Stanhope family

Parliament of Great Britain
Preceded by Fletcher Norton; Anthony Morris Storer	Member of Parliament for Carlisle; 1775–1780; With: Anthony Morris Storer	Succeeded by Earl of Surrey; William Lowther
Preceded by Sir James Lowther; Edward Norton	Member of Parliament for Haslemere; 1780–1784; With: Hon. Edward Norton	Succeeded by Thomas Postlethwaite; John Baynes-Garforth
Preceded by William Wilberforce; Samuel Thornton	Member of Parliament for Kingston upon Hull; 1784–1790; With: Samuel Thornton	Succeeded by Samuel Thornton; Earl of Burford
Parliament of the United Kingdom
Preceded by Edward Burrow; John Baynes Garforth	Member of Parliament for Cockermouth; December 1800–1802; With: John Baynes Garforth	Succeeded by Robert Plumer Ward; James Graham
Preceded by John Christian Curwen; Sir Frederick Fletcher-Vane, Bt	Member of Parliament for Carlisle; 1802–1812; With: John Christian Curwen	Succeeded by Sir James Graham, Bt; Henry Fawcett
