= James Lowther (1753–1837) =

British soldier and Tory politician

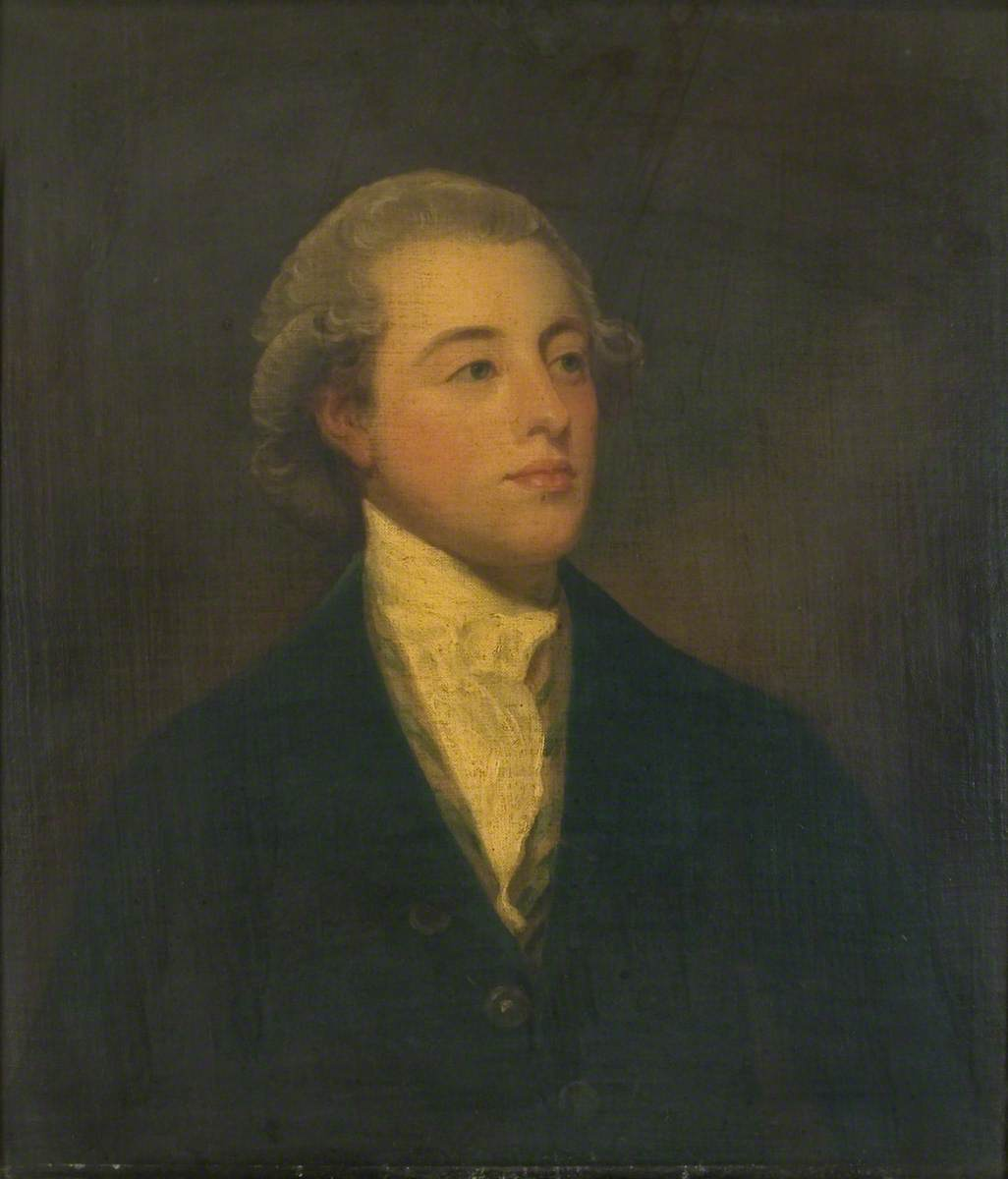
Portrait of Colonel James Lowther as a Young Man, painting by unidentified artist, 1800-1810.

Colonel James Lowther (23 February 1753 – 1837) was a British soldier and Tory politician who sat in the House of Commons for 43 years from 1775 to 1818.

He was the second son of Rev. Henry Lowther, rector of Aikton, and Dorothy Tatham. Rev. Henry was the great-grandson of Rev. Lancelot Lowther, rector of Long Marston and son of Sir Christopher Lowther (1557–1617). Rev. Lancelot founded the cadet branch of Lowther of Colby Leathes, the heads of which family were largely clerics with livings in the gift of the more senior branches of the Lowther family.

James, however, took a more active role in the service of his fourth cousin, James Lowther, 1st Earl of Lonsdale. As one of "Lord Lonsdale's ninepins", he was member of parliament for Westmorland from 1775 until 1812, and then for Appleby from 1812 until 1818. He was also returned for Haslemere in 1790, but preferred to continue to sit for Westmorland. In addition to his political role, Lowther served as second to Lord Lonsdale in two notable duels, the first in June 1792 with an officer of the Life Guards, and the second in 1796 with Sir Frederick Fletcher-Vane, 2nd Baronet.

Lowther was for some time the commander of the Royal Cumberland Militia. In 1798, he was transferred to command the Royal Westmorland Militia, and was commissioned a colonel in the regular Army when that regiment was embodied.

He died in Caen, Normandy in the summer of 1837.

Parliament of Great Britain
Preceded by Sir James Lowther, Bt; Sir Michael le Fleming, Bt	Member of Parliament for Westmorland; 1775–1801; With: Sir Michael le Fleming, Bt 1775–1801	Succeeded by Parliament of the United Kingdom
Preceded by John Baynes-Garforth; John Lowther	Member of Parliament for Haslemere; 1790; With: William Gerard Hamilton	Succeeded by William Gerard Hamilton; Richard Penn
Parliament of the United Kingdom
Preceded by Parliament of Great Britain	Member of Parliament for Westmorland; 1801–1812; With: Sir Michael le Fleming, Bt 1801–1806; The Lord Muncaster 1806–1812	Succeeded by The Lord Muncaster; Henry Lowther
Preceded by James Ramsay Cuthbert; Nicholas Ridley-Colborne	Member of Parliament for Appleby; 1812–1818; With: John Courtenay 1812; George Tierney 1812–1818	Succeeded by George Fludyer; Lucius Concannon
