= James Adair (serjeant-at-law) =

Irish-born London-based judge

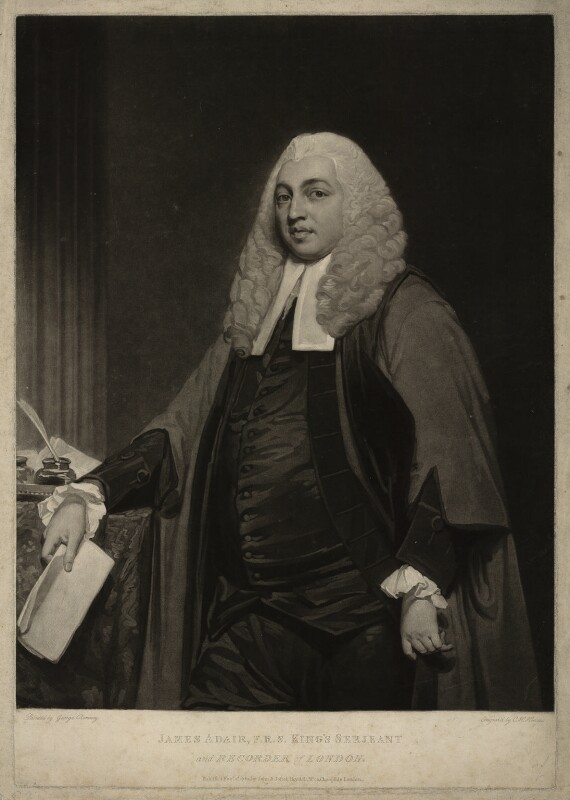

James Adair, KS (c.1743 – 21 July 1798) was an Irish-born judge, serjeant-at-law, and Member of Parliament, who spent his career based in London.

== Career ==
Adair was admitted to Peterhouse, Cambridge, and took a B.A. in 1764, and M.A. in 1767. He was educated in law and a due course called to the bar by the society of Lincoln's Inn. In the early part of the reign of George III he was ranked among the advocates of the popular side; in 1771, he was employed as counsel in the famous case of the House of Commons against the printers of Letters of Junius, and in this and other instances gave so much satisfaction to the citizens, that, on the death of John Glynn, he was elected Recorder of London, a post he held until 1789.

In 1774, he took the degree of serjeant-at-law and afterwards confined his practice chiefly to the Court of Common Pleas. On his promotion to be a king's serjeant in 1782, he took the lead in that court for several years. Following the split of the Whig Party after the French Revolution, he attached himself to the moderate party of Edmund Burke's division. In 1794 he was one of the counsels for the crown against Thomas Hardy, Horne Tooke, and others, but had no very active part assigned him. In April 1788 he was elected a Fellow of the Royal Society

In 1796, he led against the crown, with Thomas Erskine as his junior, in defence of William Stone, who was accused of treason but acquitted.

He was counsel to the Board of Ordnance, and also served as Chief Justice of Chester from 1796 to his death.

== Politics ==
At different times Adair held a seat in Parliament. He sat as MP for Cockermouth from 1775 to 1780, and from 1793 until his death was a member for Higham Ferrers.

== Conduct ==
His manner as a speaker was somewhat coarse, but it was impressive. He had great copiousness and fluency of delivery, and his powers of reasoning were of the highest order.

== Death and burial ==
Adair died suddenly at his house in Lincoln's Inn Fields, London, on 21 July 1798. He was buried in Bunhill Fields burial ground.

== Works ==
Adair was author of several tracts.

- Thoughts on the Dismission of Officers for their Conduct in Parliament (1764).
- Observations on the Power of Alienation in the Crown (1768).
- Discussions of the Law of Libels (1785).

Parliament of Great Britain
| Preceded by George Johnstone; Fletcher Norton | Member of Parliament for Cockermouth; 1775–1780; With: Ralph Gowland | Succeeded by John Lowther; John Baynes-Garforth |
| Preceded by John Lee | Member of Parliament for Higham Ferrers; 1793–1798 | Succeeded by Stephen Thurston Adey |
Legal offices
| Preceded by Edward Bearcroft | Chief Justice of Chester; 1796–1798 | Succeeded by William Grant |
