= Hyde Heath =

Village in Buckinghamshire, England

Coordinates: 51.691°N 0.651°W

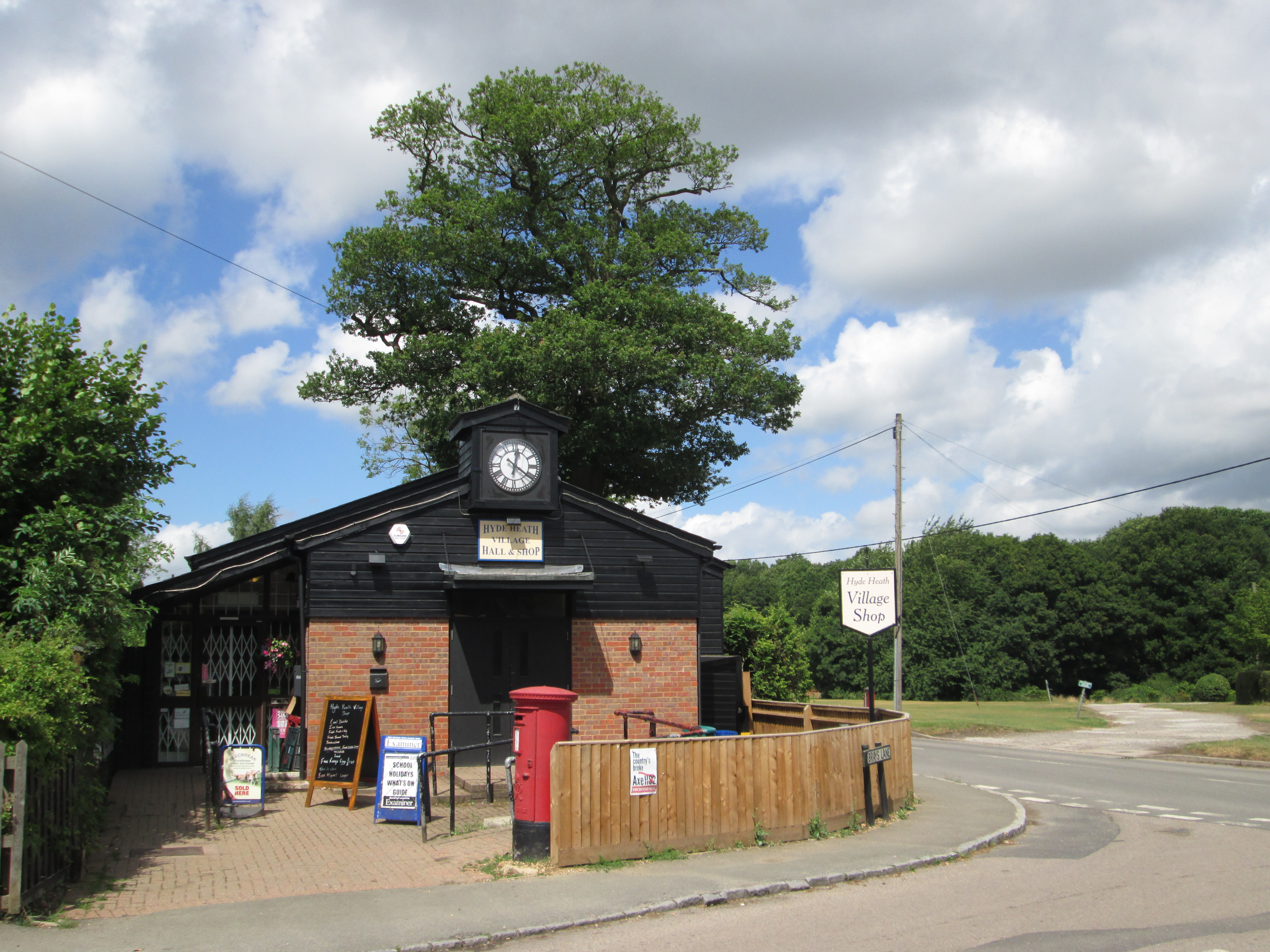
- Village store, Hyde Heath, 2013

- Location within Buckinghamshire
- OS grid reference: SP935005
- Civil parish: Little Missenden
- Unitary authority: Buckinghamshire
- Ceremonial county: Buckinghamshire
- Region: South East
- Country: England
- Sovereign state: United Kingdom
- Post town: AMERSHAM
- Postcode district: HP6
- Dialling code: 01494
- Police: Thames Valley
- Fire: Buckinghamshire
- Ambulance: South Central
- UK Parliament: Mid Buckinghamshire

Hyde Heath is a village in the civil parish of Little Missenden, in the Buckinghamshire district of the ceremonial county of Buckinghamshire, England. It is located in the Chiltern Hills, around 1 mile (1.6 km) northeast of the village of Little Missenden and 2.5 miles (4 km) northwest of Amersham.

The village's name refers to the value of the estate that once stood there. The heath was valued at the price of one hide, an amount of land enough to support one free family and its dependants.

Currently there is a primary school, pre school, toddler group, nursing home "Rayners," a pub and restaurant "The Plough", a Village Hall & Shop, two car mechanics garages "Heath Motors" and "Autobarn", a VAG specialist .

Hyde Heath is also host to one of the largest village fetes in the country, held in May of each year. It incorporates many traditional games and stalls and a dog show, as well as various displays (such as falconry and acrobatic demonstrations from the local school), tea and coffees, a large BBQ and ice cream stand, and an ever-popular Classic Car Display.

Also there is the annual Hyde Heath Beer Festival held on the village Green in June.

== Churches ==
Hyde Heath has two churches. The Baptists were active in Hyde Heath since the 1800s. A church was established which was a branch of Amersham and then became a branch of Chesham Lower Baptist church (now Trinity). The chapel is now a house called "The Olde Chapel" on the Common. It had its own burial ground. In 1932 they built the current chapel in Bray's Lane called "Union Chapel" which was meant to be a Free church.

There was a Mission Room of Little Missenden Church in Hyde Heath in the 1880s and 1890s. After Hyde Heath School was built the Parish of Chesham held services in the school. They then built a Mission Room in 1909. This is now called St Andrew's Church and is part of Little Missenden parish.
