= Rowland Stephenson (Carlisle MP) =

Rowland Stephenson (1728-1807) was a British Tory politician for a Cumberland constituency.

He was M.P. for Carlisle from 1787 to 1790. He died on 30 September 1807.
