= Sir John Lowther, 1st Baronet, of Swillington =

English landowner and Member of Parliament

Sir John Lowther, 1st Baronet (1 April 1759 – 19 March 1844) of Swillington, Yorkshire was an English landowner and Member of Parliament.

He was the second son of Sir William Lowther, 1st Baronet and educated at Westminster School and Trinity College, Cambridge.

On 4 September 1790, he married Lady Elizabeth Fane (d. 1844), daughter of John Fane, 9th Earl of Westmorland. They had four children:

- Sir John Henry Lowther, 2nd Baronet (1793–1868)
- George William Lowther (17 October 1795 – 1805)
- Sir Charles Hugh Lowther, 3rd Baronet (1803–1894)
- Elizabeth Lowther (d. 2 October 1863), unmarried

He purchased the estate at Wilton Castle in about 1806 and built a new mansion house there. At some time after his elder brother was created Earl of Lonsdale, the Swillington estate was made over to John, who was himself created a baronet on 3 November 1824.

He died in 1844 and was succeeded by his eldest son John Henry Lowther.

Parliament of Great Britain
Preceded by Ralph Gowland; James Adair	Member of Parliament for Cockermouth; 1780–1786; With: John Baynes-Garforth 1780–1784; James Clarke Satterthwaite 1784–1786	Succeeded by James Clarke Satterthwaite; Humphrey Senhouse
Preceded by Earl of Surrey; Edward Norton	Member of Parliament for Carlisle; 1786; With: Earl of Surrey	Succeeded by Earl of Surrey; John Christian
Preceded by Thomas Postlethwaite; John Baynes-Garforth	Member of Parliament for Haslemere; 1786–1790; With: John Baynes-Garforth	Succeeded by William Gerard Hamilton; James Lowther
Preceded by Sir Henry Fletcher, Bt; Humphrey Senhouse	Member of Parliament for Cumberland; 1796–1801; With: Sir Henry Fletcher, Bt	Succeeded by (Union of Great Britain and Ireland)
Parliament of the United Kingdom
Preceded by (Union of Great Britain and Ireland)	Member of Parliament for Cumberland; 1801–1831; With: Sir Henry Fletcher, Bt 1801–1806; Viscount Morpeth 1806–1820; John Christian Curwen 1820–1828; Sir James Graham, Bt 1829–1831	Succeeded by Sir James Graham, Bt; William Blamire
Preceded by James Graham; Lord Garlies	Member of Parliament for Cockermouth; 1806–1807; With: James Graham	Succeeded by James Graham; Lord Binning
Preceded by James Graham; Lord Binning	Member of Parliament for Cockermouth; 1807; With: James Graham	Succeeded by James Graham; John Osborn
Preceded by Sir James Graham, 1st Bt; Viscount Lowther	Member of Parliament for Cockermouth; 1812; With: Viscount Lowther	Succeeded by Viscount Lowther; Augustus Foster
Baronetage of the United Kingdom
New title	Baronet (of Swillington); 1824–1844	Succeeded by John Lowther
