= James Lowther, 1st Earl of Lonsdale =

English landowner and politician

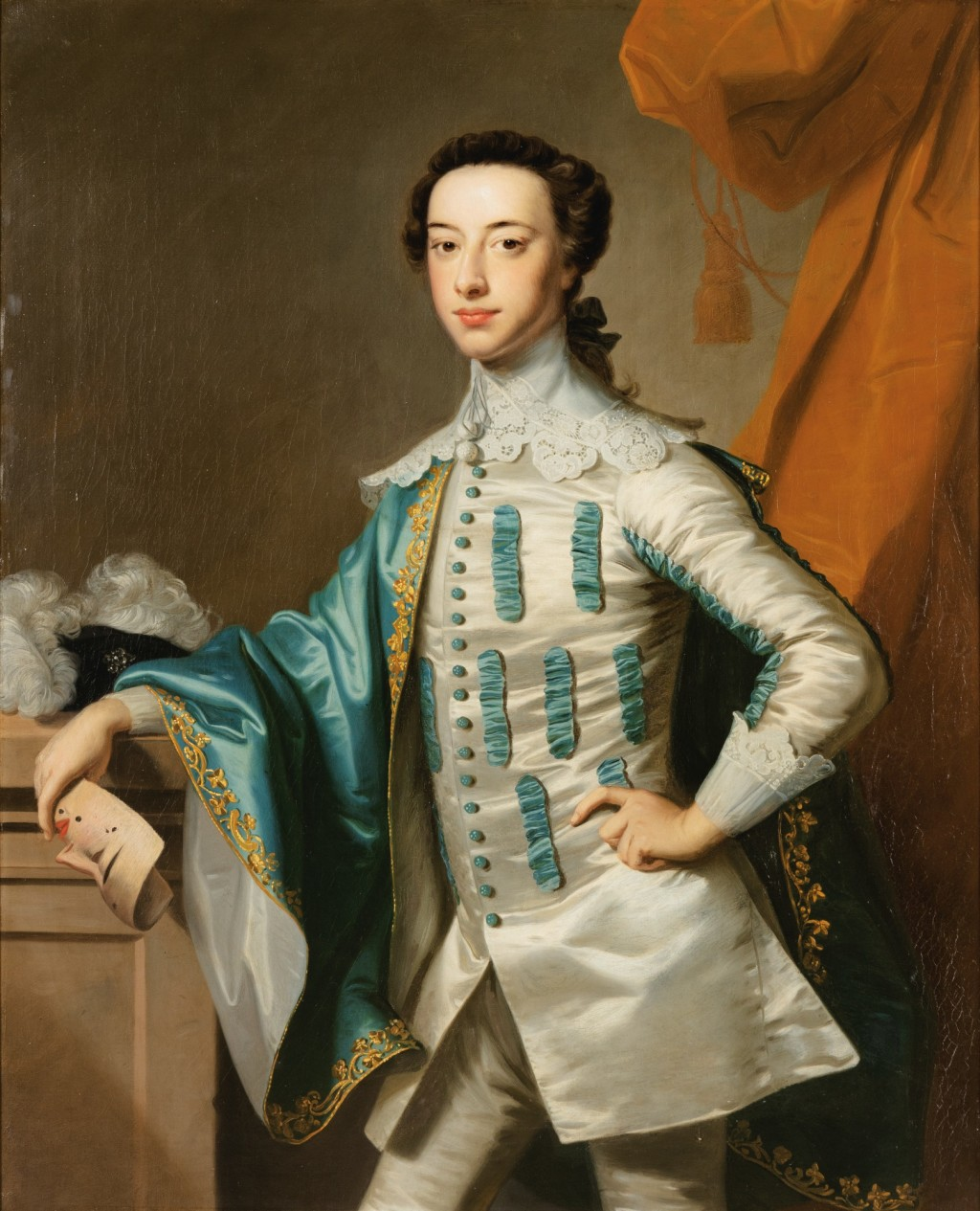
James Lowther, 1st Earl Lonsdale (Thomas Hudson)

James Lowther, 1st Earl of Lonsdale (5 August 1736 – 24 May 1802) was an English landowner and politician who sat in the House of Commons for 27 years from 1757 to 1784, when he was raised to the Peerage of Great Britain as Earl of Lonsdale.

== Life ==
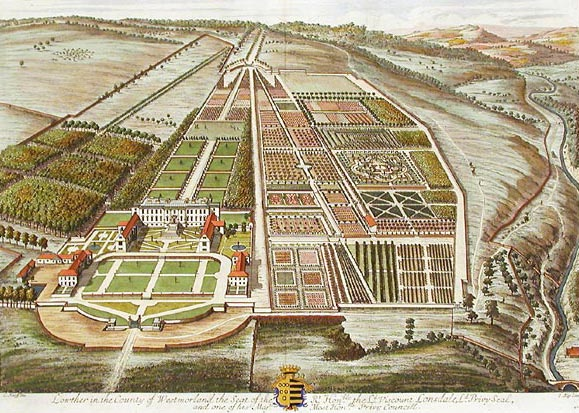
Lowther Castle in the early 18th century

The son of Robert Lowther of Maulds Meaburn, Westmorland, and Catherine (or Katherine) Pennington, he was educated at Peterhouse, Cambridge.

Born in 1736, he succeeded his father in 1745 to the Meaburn estates, and then, on 6 March 1751, to the baronetcy (becoming 5th Baronet of Lowther) and to the Lowther Hall estate, owned by his great-uncle Henry Lowther, 3rd Viscount Lonsdale. The inheritance from his father included the Christchurch Plantation, a slave plantation in Barbados. He also inherited the estates, in Westmorland and Middlesex, of his cousin Sir James Lowther, 4th Baronet, of Whitehaven in 1755. The Cumberland (including the coal-mines) and Lancashire estates (Marske and Holker) of Sir James had been inherited by Sir William Lowther, 3rd Baronet, of Marske Hall and Holker Hall, but he died unmarried aged 29, in 1756. Under the terms of the will of Sir James of Whitehaven, James, the subject of this article, inherited the land and coal-mining interests in the Cumberland (Whitehaven) area from Sir William; however, the same terms also meant that he did not receive the two halls. Thus, by 1756, Sir James Lowther had an income of c.£45,000 a year and was "probably the most powerful man in the north-west."

Lowther exercised influence over a number of "rotten" or "pocket" boroughs, including Appleby, a classic example of this type of constituency. In 1761 he was credited with securing the return of eight MPs—two each for Cumberland, Westmorland, and Cockermouth, and one each for Appleby and Carlisle. Later, in 1781, he secured the election of William Pitt the Younger as member for Appleby.

He married Mary Crichton-Stuart, daughter of John Stuart, 3rd Earl of Bute, and Mary Wortley-Montagu, 1st Baroness Mount Stuart, on 7 September 1761 and had a string of mistresses. He fell in love with the daughter of one of his tenants and made her his mistress keeping her in luxury. When she died he could not endure to have her buried and the body remained lying in bed until the increasing putrefaction became unbearable. He then had her body placed in a glass topped coffin that was placed in a cupboard. Eventually her body was buried in Paddington cemetery.

He was created Earl of Lonsdale on 24 May 1784 and Viscount Lowther on 26 October 1797, with special remainder to his third cousin Sir William Lowther, 2nd Baronet, of Little Preston.

On 9 June 1792 he fought a duel with a Captain Cuthbert of the Guards, when the latter refused to let the former's carriage pass through Mount Street in London where some rioting had been taking place. The Earl asked him if he knew who he was; this led to an unpleasant exchange of words following which the Earl felt obliged to challenge the Captain to a duel the next morning. A pistol ball passed through the flap of Cuthbert's coat but after the exchange of fire both men were unhurt. The matter was concluded with a handshake. In January 1798, he fought another duel with Sir Frederick Fletcher-Vane in Hyde Park.

He was variously known as "Wicked Jimmy", the "Bad Earl", the "Gloomy Earl" and "Jimmy" or "Jemmy Grasp-all, Earl of Toadstool". One contemporary described him as "tyrannical, overbearing, violent, and frequently under no restraint of temper or of reason."

== Death and succession ==
He died in 1802, having had no children by his wife. The Yorkshire estates passed to a cousin, John Lowther, and the Barbados plantation went to his sisters. His earldom and baronetcy became extinct, but he was succeeded as Viscount Lowther, according to the special remainder, by his third cousin William Lowther, 2nd Viscount Lowther, who was later (1807) advanced to Earl of Lonsdale of the second creation. The latter, a coal magnate, also inherited Lowther Castle, which he rebuilt between 1806 and 1814.

== The Earl and the Wordsworth family ==
Lowther had accumulated debts to his solicitor, John Wordsworth, the father of William Wordsworth. Although Wordsworth worked for Lowther, Lowther never paid Wordsworth for his various expenses, which amounted to £4,000 from 1763 until Wordsworth's death in 1783. This debt was finally discharged after his death by his successor.

== Notes ==
Parliament of Great Britain
Preceded by Sir John Pennington, Bt; Sir William Fleming, Bt	Member of Parliament for Cumberland; 1757–1761; With: Sir John Pennington, Bt	Succeeded by Sir John Pennington, Bt; Sir Wilfrid Lawson, Bt
Preceded by Sir George Dalston, Bt; Robert Lowther	Member of Parliament for Westmorland; 1761–1763; With: John Upton	Succeeded by John Upton; Robert Lowther
Preceded by Sir John Pennington, Bt; Sir Wilfrid Lawson, Bt	Member of Parliament for Cumberland; 1762–1768; With: Sir John Pennington, Bt 1762–1768; Henry Curwen 1768	Succeeded by Henry Curwen; Henry Fletcher
Preceded by Sir George Macartney; George Johnstone	Member of Parliament for Cockermouth; 1769–1774; With: George Johnstone	Succeeded by George Johnstone; Fletcher Norton
Preceded by John Robinson; Thomas Fenwick	Member of Parliament for Westmorland; 1774–1775; With: Sir Michael le Fleming, Bt	Succeeded by Sir Michael le Fleming, Bt; James Lowther
Preceded by Henry Curwen; Henry Fletcher	Member of Parliament for Cumberland; 1774–1784; With: Henry Fletcher	Succeeded by Henry Fletcher; William Lowther
Preceded by Sir Merrick Burrell, Bt; Peter Burrell	Member of Parliament for Haslemere; 1780; With: Edward Norton	Succeeded by Edward Norton; Walter Spencer Stanhope
Honorary titles
Preceded by Sir John Pennington, Bt	Lord Lieutenant of Westmorland; 1758–1802	Succeeded by The Viscount Lowther
Preceded by The Earl of Egremont	Lord Lieutenant of Cumberland; 1759–1802	Succeeded by The Viscount Lowther
Vacant Title last held by The Earl of Egremont	Custos Rotulorum of Cumberland; 1765–1802	Succeeded by The Viscount Lowther
Vacant Title last held by The Earl of Egremont	Vice-Admiral of Cumberland; 1765–1802	Vacant Title next held by The Earl of Lonsdale
Vacant Title last held by Sir James Lowther, Bt	Vice-Admiral of Westmorland; 1765–1802	Vacant
Peerage of Great Britain
New title	Earl of Lonsdale; 1784–1802	Extinct
New title	Viscount Lowther; 1797–1802	Succeeded by William Lowther
Baronetage of Nova Scotia
Preceded by Henry Lowther	Baronet (of Lowther); 1751–1802	Extinct
