= 1790 British general election =

Election in Great Britain

- 16 June – 28 July 1790

All 558 seats in the House of Commons 280 seats needed for a majority
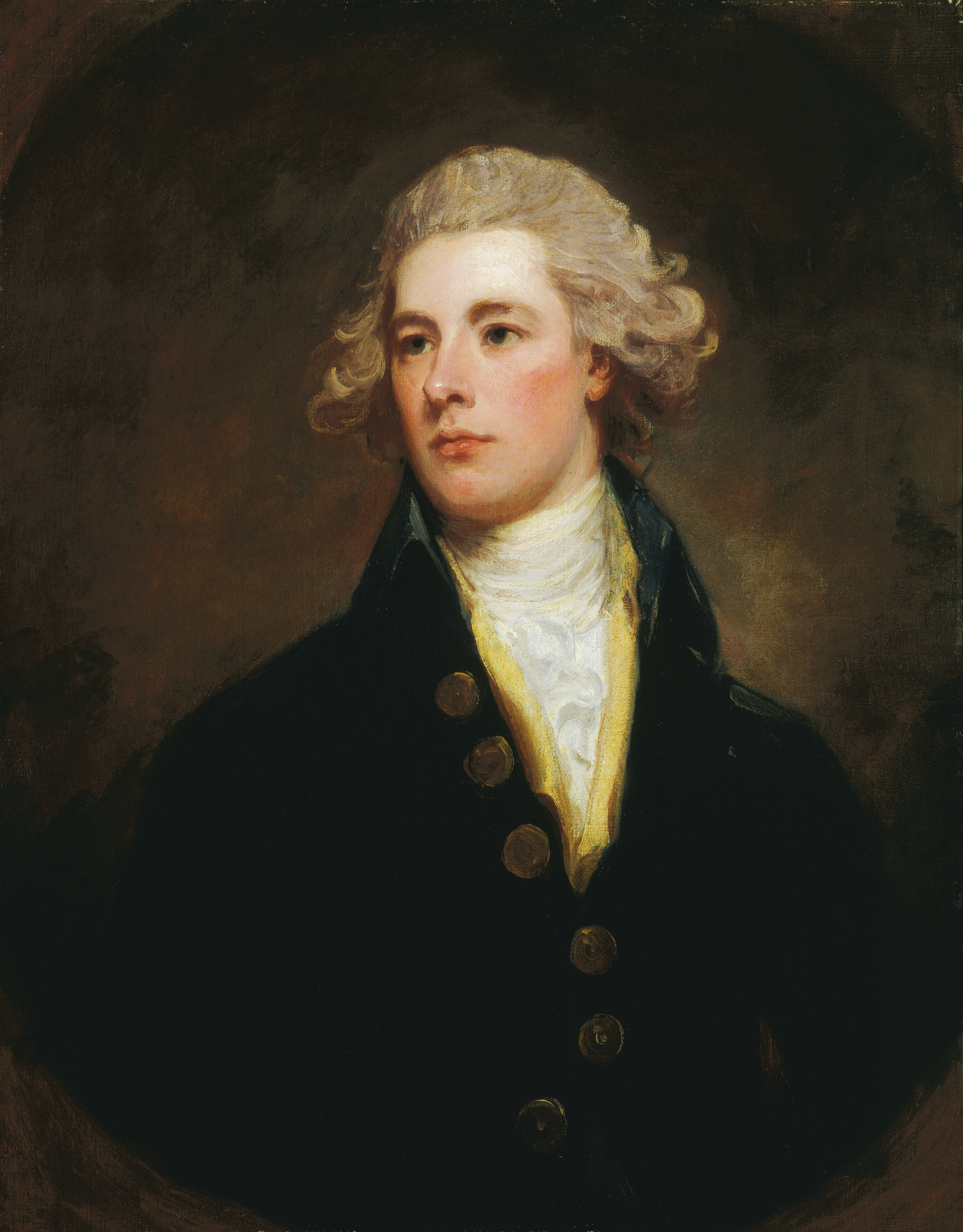

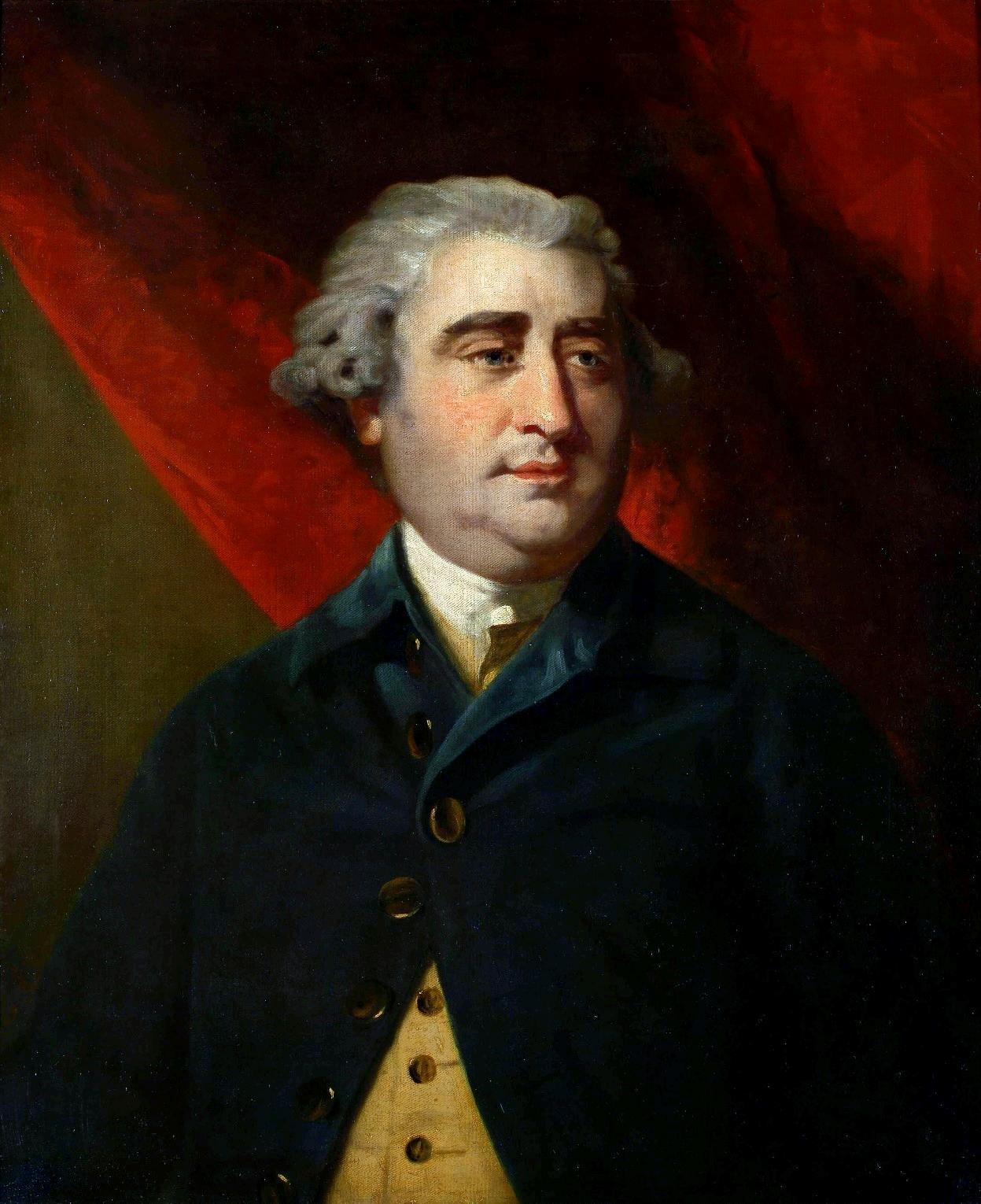
| | First party | Second party |
|---|---|---|
| Leader | William Pitt | Charles James Fox |
| Party | Tory (Pittite) | Whig (Foxite) |
| Leader's seat | Cambridge University | Westminster |
| Seats won | 340 | 183 |
| Seat change | ▲60 | ▲28 |
- Composition of the House of Commons following the election.
Prime Minister before election
William Pitt
Pittite
Prime Minister after
election
William Pitt
Pittite

The 1790 British general election returned members to serve in the House of Commons of the 17th Parliament of Great Britain to be summoned after the merger of the Parliament of England and the Parliament of Scotland in 1707.

== Political situation ==
The Prime Minister since 1783, William Pitt the Younger, led a coalition of Whig and Tory politicians.

The principal opposition to Pitt was a faction of Whigs led by Charles James Fox and the Duke of Portland.

== Dates of election ==
The general election was held between 16 June 1790 and 28 July 1790. At this period elections did not take place at the same time in every constituency. The returning officer in each county or parliamentary borough fixed the precise date (see hustings for details of the conduct of the elections).

This was the first general election after the law had been changed in 1785 to limit the maximum duration of polling in county elections to fifteen days. Under the old law, the poll could remain open longer. For example, the election for Sussex in 1774 had polls open for 24 days (ignoring Sundays when polling did not take place). It was hoped that the change would reduce the enormous expense of most contested county elections.

== Summary of the constituencies ==
See 1796 British general election, for details. The constituencies used were the same throughout the existence of the Parliament of Great Britain.

== Results ==

=== Seats summary ===
Parliamentary seats
| Tory/Pittite | 65.0% |
| Whig/Foxite | 35.0% |

== See also ==
- List of parliaments of Great Britain
- List of MPs elected in the 1790 British general election
