= Cumberland and Westmorland Antiquarian and Archaeological Society =

English historical and research society

- Formation: 1866
- Type: Historical society
- Registration no.: 227786
- Legal status: Charity
- Purpose: Historical study and research
- Headquarters: United Kingdom
- Activities: Research and publications, lectures and events
- Collections: Library, archives
- Patrons: Rt Rev. James Newcome, Bishop of Carlisle, Claire Hensman, Lord Lieutenant of Cumbria
- President: Warren Allison
- Website: www.cumbriapast.com

The Cumberland and Westmorland Antiquarian and Archaeological Society, founded in 1866, is a local historical, antiquarian, archaeological and text publication society and registered charity covering the modern county of Cumbria. Its long name is often abbreviated to CWAAS in references.

== Aims ==
The society exists to "promote, encourage, foster" the combined studies of genealogy, history, custom and archaeology, within the boundaries of the non-metropolitan county of Cumbria (which, as well as the two titular historic counties of Cumberland and Westmorland, includes elements of historic Yorkshire and Lancashire).

== History ==
The society was established in Penrith, Cumbria on 11 September 1866, with "five business and professional men from both counties" as founder-members. The then Earl of Lonsdale was appointed honorary president. One of the society's first official acts was to campaign for the protection of the Dunmail Raise cairn, and to organise an archaeological dig on the Low Borrow Bridge Roman fort, near Tebay. Membership rose to 115 by 1866 (with around a quarter being clergymen), and "includ[ed] three ladies". The society returned to the Low Borrow Bridge site, by then a scheduled monument, in 2011 and discovered further evidence as to the size of the camp, while in 2015 it was a joint funder of work into a dendrochronological dating on Kendal's fourteenth-century Castle Dairy.

== Publications ==
A publishing arm was created in 1877, and has been responsible for publishing its peer-reviewed journal The Transactions of the Society annually since then.

From 2015 a triannual newsletter has also been published. The Society also publishes dedicated books for specific areas of interest; for example, the Extra Series, meaning they are extra to the Transactions, and for the Records, Research, and Tracts series).

=== Select publications ===
- Mullett, M. A. (2015), Patronage, Power and Politics in Appleby in the Era of Lady Anne Clifford 1649–1689, ISBN 978-1873124710.
- Zant, J. (2015), Penrith: the Historic Core, ISBN 978-1873124703.
- Brennand, M.; Stringer, K.J., eds. (2011), The Making of Carlisle: From Romans to Railways, ISBN 978-1873124505.
- Cherry, P. (2007), Studies in Northern Prehistory, ISBN 9781873124444.
- Austin, P. S. (1991), Bewcastle and Old Penrith, ISBN 978-1873124017.

== Presidents ==
The following have served as president of the society:

- William Lowther, 1866–1872
- Henry Lowther, 1872–1876
- St George Lowther, 1876–1882
- Canon James Simpson, 1882–1886
- Richard Saul Ferguson, 1886–1900
- Henry Ware, 1900–1909
- Thomas Hesketh Hodgson, 1909–1915
- Francis John Haverfield, 1915–1919
- William Gershom Collingwood, 1920–1932
- R. G. Collingwood, 1932–1938
- Walter Travers McIntire, 1938–1944
- Lt.-Col. Oliver Henry North, 1945–1947
- Frank Gerald Simpson, 1947–1948
- Katherine (Kate) Hodgson, 1948–1951
- Joseph Edward Spence, 1951–1954
- Canon Charles Murray Lowther Bouch, 1954–1957
- Eric Barff Birley, 1957–1960
- Christopher Roy Hudleston, 1960–1963
- Clare Isobel Fell, 1963–1966
- Roger Fulford, 1966–1968
- John Charlton, 1968–1971
- Revd John Compton Dickinson, 1971–1974
- Paul Wilson, 1974–1978
- Dorothy Charlesworth, 1978–1981
- Joseph (Fred) Hughes, 1981–1984
- Rosemary Jean Cramp, 1984–1987
- James (Jim) Cherry, 1987–1990
- Ronald Brunskill, 1990–1993
- Ruth Barbara Harbottle, 1993–1996
- John Macnair Todd, 1996–1999
- Geoffrey Haward Martin, 1999–2002
- Angus James Logie Winchester, 2002–2005
- David Shotter, 2005–2008
- Richard Newman, 2008–2011
- David Breeze, 2011–2014
- Rachel Margaret Newman, 2014–2017
- Rosemary Jean Cramp, 2017–2020
- Rob David, 2020–2023
- Warren Allison, 2023–present
