= List of Whig Party MPs (UK) =

This is a list of Whig Party MPs. It includes all members of Parliament elected to the British House of Commons representing the Whig Party.

== List of MPs ==
=== A ===
- Richard Abell, Richmond (Yorkshire), 1720–1722; Aylesbury, 1722–1727
- George Abercromby, Clackmannanshire, 1806–1807 & 1812–1815
- James Abercromby, Midhurst, 1807–1812; Calne, 1812–1830; Edinburgh, 1832–1839
- John Abercromby, Clackmannanshire, 1815–1817
- Joseph Acton, Wigan, 1854–1857
- Robert Adair, Appleby, 1799–1800 & 1801–1802; Camelford, 1802–1812
- Joseph Addison, Parliament of Great Britain for Lostwithiel 1708–1709; Malmesbury, 1710–1719; Parliament of Ireland for Cavan Borough 1709–1713
- Henry Aglionby Aglionby, Cockermouth, 1832–1854
- John Aislabie, Ripon, 1705–1721
- George Anson, Saltash, 1761–1768; Lichfield, 1770–1789
- John Arnold, Monmouth, 1680–1685; Southwark, 1689–1695

- Henry John Adeane
- Henry John Adeane (born 1833)
- Francis Aglionby
- Henry Aglionby Aglionby
- Peter Ainsworth (Whig politician)
- John Aislabie
- John Spencer, 3rd Earl Spencer
- Richard Pepper Arden, 1st Baron Alvanley
- John Angerstein (MP)
- George Anson (British Army officer, born 1797)
- William Lee Antonie
- George Campbell, 6th Duke of Argyll
- Francis Baring, 3rd Baron Ashburton
- William Ashhurst
- Arthur Atherley
- George Eden, 1st Earl of Auckland
- Gilbert Heathcote, 1st Baron Aveland
- Henry Aylmer, 2nd Baron Aylmer

=== B ===
Member	Constituency	Years served
John Bagshaw	Sudbury Harwich	1835–1837 1847–1859

=== C ===
Member	Constituency	Years served
George Colebrooke	Arundel	1729–1809
Charles Cox	Southwark	1695–1712
