= Richard Bourke, 6th Earl of Mayo =

British Conservative statesman and 4th Viceroy of India (1822–1872)

His Excellency The Right Honourable The Lord Mayo KP GCSI PC PC (Ire)
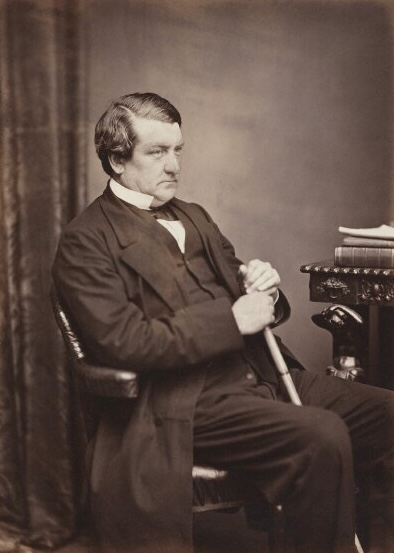
- Photograph by William Walker, c. 1867

Viceroy and Governor-General of India
- In office 12 January 1869 – 8 February 1872
- Monarch: Victoria
- Preceded by: Sir John Lawrence, Bt
- Succeeded by: Sir John Strachey (acting)

Chief Secretary for Ireland
- In office 10 July 1866 – 29 September 1868
- Monarch: Victoria
- Prime Minister: The Earl of Derby; Benjamin Disraeli
- Preceded by: Chichester Parkinson-Fortescue
- Succeeded by: John Wilson-Patten
- In office 4 March 1858 – 11 June 1859
- Prime Minister: The Earl of Derby
- Preceded by: Henry Arthur Herbert
- Succeeded by: Edward Cardwell
- In office 1 March 1852 – 17 December 1852
- Prime Minister: The Earl of Derby
- Preceded by: Sir William Somerville, Bt
- Succeeded by: Sir John Young, Bt
Parliamentary offices
Member of Parliament for Cockermouth
In office 1857–1868 Serving with: John Steel; Andrew Green Thompson
Preceded by	Henry Wyndham; John Steel
Succeeded by	Isaac Fletcher
Member of Parliament for Coleraine
In office 1852–1857
Preceded by	John Boyd
Succeeded by	John Boyd
Member of Parliament for County Kildare
In office 1847–1852 Serving with Marquess of Kildare
Preceded by	Richard More O'Ferrall; Robert Archbold
Succeeded by	Willian Cogan; Marquess of Kildare

Personal details
- Born: Richard Southwell Bourke; 21 February 1822 Dublin, Ireland
- Died: 8 February 1872 (aged 49) Port Blair, Andaman Islands, India
- Cause of death: Assassination
- Party: Conservative
- Spouse: Hon. Blanche Wyndham (m. 1848)
- Children: 7, including Dermot and Maurice
- Parents: Robert Bourke, 5th Earl of Mayo; Anne Charlotte Jocelyn
- Relatives: Robert Bourke, 1st Baron Connemara (brother)
- Education: Trinity College Dublin (B.A., 1844; M.A., 1851; LLD., 1852)

Richard Southwell Bourke, 6th Earl of Mayo, (English: /bɜːrk/; BURK; 21 February 1822 – 8 February 1872) styled Lord Naas (/neɪs/; NAYSS) from 1842 to 1867, was a prominent British statesman, colonial administrator, and diplomat. He was a Member of Parliament from the British Conservative Party from 1847 to 1868, and served as the Chief Secretary for Ireland for three terms (1852, 1858–9, 1866–8). In 1869, he was appointed as the 4th Viceroy of India with the political title Lord Mayo. During an official visit to Port Blair in 1872, he was assassinated and was the only Viceroy of India to be killed while in office.

== Background and education ==
Mayo was born in Dublin, Ireland, the eldest son of Robert Bourke, 5th Earl of Mayo (the son of Hon. Richard Burke, Bishop of Waterford and Lismore), and his wife, Anne Charlotte, daughter of the Hon. John Jocelyn. His younger brother the Hon. Robert Bourke was also a successful politician.

Mayo was educated at Trinity College Dublin (attaining BA in 1844, MA in 1851, and LLD in 1852). He and his brothers were accomplished horsemen and enjoyed fox hunting. From 1844 to 1846, he also served as Gentleman of the Bedchamber to the Lord Lieutenant of Ireland William à Court, 1st Baron Heytesbury.

== Political career ==
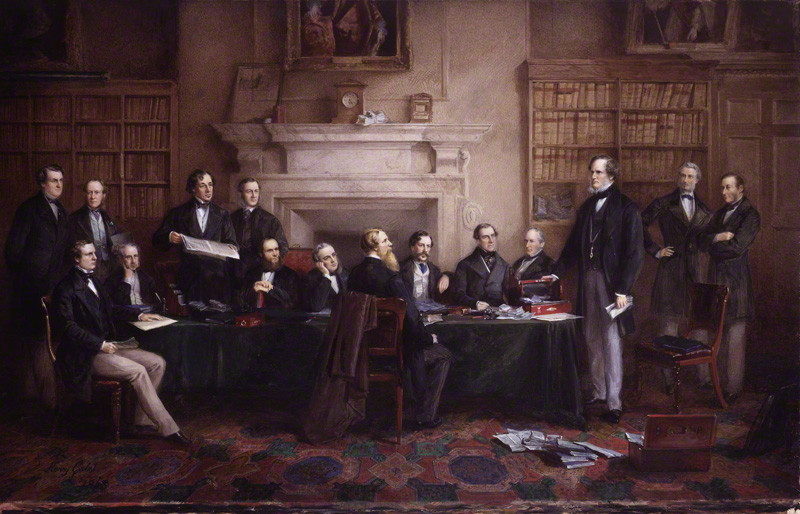
The Cabinet of the Earl of Derby in 1867

From June to August 1845, Mayo travelled to Russia visiting the court of Nicholas I of Russia. He detailed his travels in a written account, published as St. Petersburg and Moscow (1846). He also visited Revel and Finland before returning home.

Mayo was elected a MP for three different constituencies over his lifetime. He served as MP for County Kildare (1847–52), Coleraine (1852–7) and Cockermouth (1857–68).

He was thrice appointed Chief Secretary for Ireland – in 1852, 1858 and 1866. While Chief Secretary in Ireland, he led government efforts to stop clandestine activity and the operation of secret nationalist societies, including the Phoenix National and Literary Society and others.

In 1867, he succeeded his father as Earl of Mayo (but as an Irish peer was able to retain his seat in the commons) until he gave up his seat in 1868 on appointment as Viceroy of India.

=== Viceroy of India ===
On 12 January 1869 he arrived in Calcutta and became the fourth Viceroy of India replacing John Lawrence, 1st Baron Lawrence. He consolidated the frontiers of India and reorganised the country's finances; he also did much to promote irrigation, railways, forests and other useful public works. To solve local problems he established local boards. During his tenure the first census took place in 1872. He founded Mayo College at Ajmer for the education of young Indian chiefs, with £70,000 being subscribed by the chiefs themselves.

== Assassination ==
While visiting the convict settlement at Port Blair in the Andaman Islands on 8 February 1872 for the purpose of inspection, he was assassinated by Sher Ali Afridi, a former Afghan soldier who had been convicted for murdering a relative. He vowed to kill two British officials to avenge the suffering he had to undergo. Mayo's body was brought home to Ireland and buried at the medieval ruined church in Johnstown, County Kildare, near his home at Palmerstown House. Afridi was hanged on March 11, 1872. Following his death, John Stracey served as the acting Viceroy of India.

== Memorials ==
=== Lord Mayo March ===
The traditional Irish march "Lord Mayo" (Tiagharna Mhaighe-eo) was named after him; according to tradition, it was composed by his harper David Murphy to appease Mayo after Murphy angered him.

=== Papilio mayo Butterfly ===
In 1873, the newly discovered swallowtail butterfly Papilio mayo from the Andaman Islands was named in his honour.

=== St Paul's Cathedral ===
A Memorial to Lord Mayo is in the third recess of the South Wall at St Paul's Cathedral, London.

=== Statue in Cockermouth, Cumbria ===
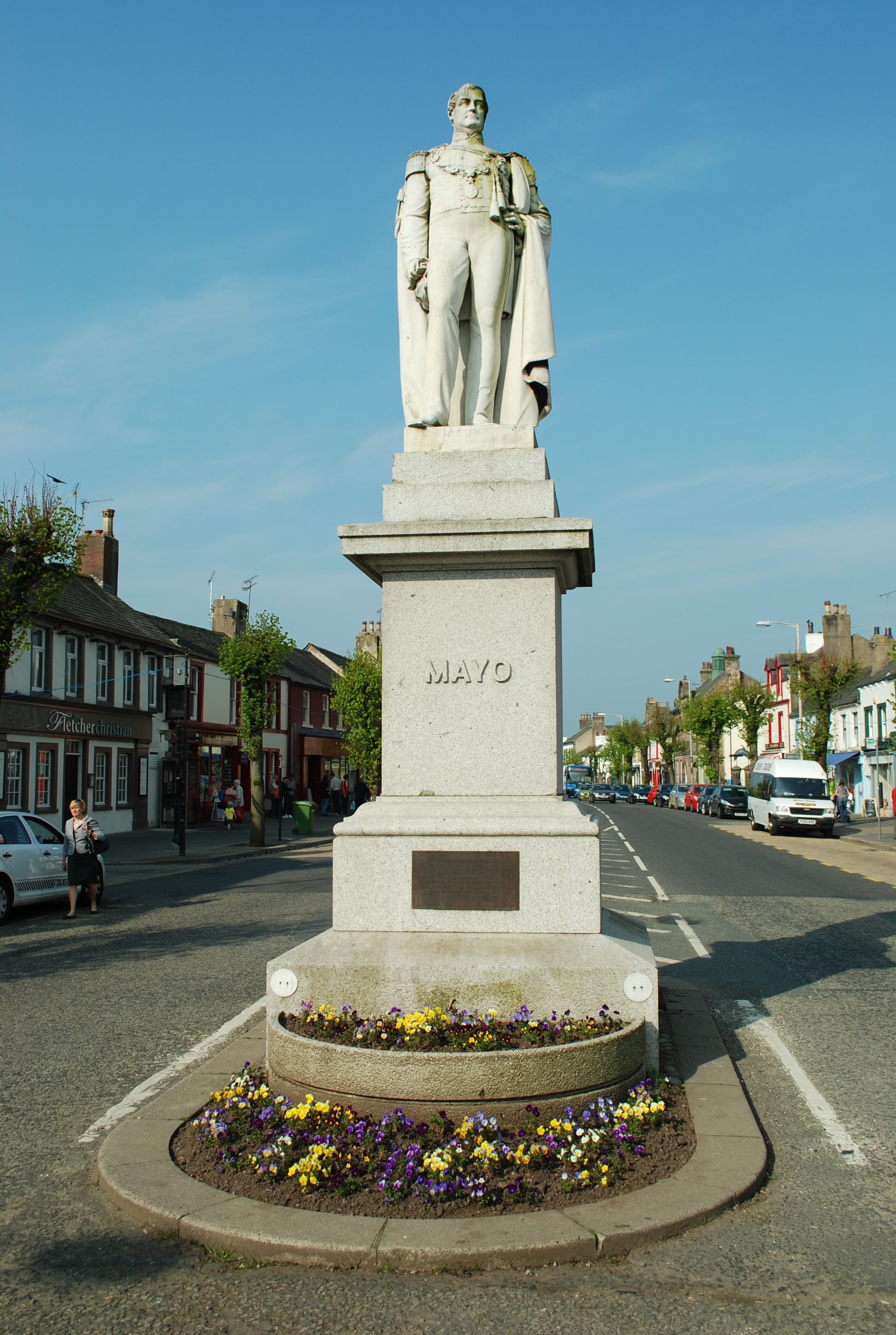
Statue of Lord Mayo in the town of Cockermouth

On 19 August 1875, a statue of Lord Mayo was unveiled in the centre of the main street in the town of Cockermouth. The 800-guinea cost of the statue (made by Messrs. Willis of London) had been raised by public subscription. The unveiling was attended by Mayo's son, the 7th Earl; Lord Napier and Ettrick; Harvey Goodwin, Bishop of Carlisle; and the Earl of Lonsdale. The statue, carved in Sicilian marble, depicts Lord Mayo in his viceregal garb, and still stands today.

=== Mayo Hospital, Lahore, Pakistan ===
Mayo Hospital is one of the oldest and biggest hospitals in Lahore, Punjab, Pakistan. The hospital is named after then Viceroy of British India, "Richard Bourke, 6th Earl of Mayo" also locally known as Lord Mayo.

=== Statue at Albert Hall Museum, Jaipur, India ===
A statue of Lord Mayo had been installed in the premises of Mayo Hospital (currently known as the Mahilya Chikatsalya, Jaipur). The 9-foot-tall (2.7 m) cast-iron statue, weighing around 3 tons, was ordered sculpted by the Maharaja Ram Singh ji of Jaipur, as a tribute to Lord Mayo after his assassination. The sculptors were J. Forsyth and R. Monti. The company's name as inscribed on the statue was R. Masefield & Co., London.

This statue of Lord Mayo had been buried in the premises of the Albert Hall Museum of Jaipur at the time of the independence of India in 1947 to prevent vandalism. After six decades, this statue was unearthed by the Jaipur Mayo Alumni Chapter on 29 May 2007. It was later removed from the Albert Hall Museum in Jaipur and sent to Mayo College, in Ajmer, India, where it is now installed.

=== Mayo College, Ajmer, India ===
Mayo College, Ajmer, India, was founded after the death of Lord Mayo in 1875. The College, named in honour of Lord Mayo, already had a full life-size statue of him sculpted in white marble installed in front of its famous main building since inception and a marble sculpted bust of him in its school museum. The College accepted the statue of Lord Mayo which was unearthed at Mayo Hospital, Jaipur in 2007.

=== Mayo Hall, Bengaluru, India ===
Mayo Hall is a building located in the center of Bengaluru. It was built in 1883 to honor the memory of Richard Bourke.

== Marriage and children ==
Mayo married Hon Blanche Julia Wyndham (1826–1918), daughter of George Wyndham, 1st Baron Leconfield, in 1848. Lady Mayo served as Lady of the Bedchamber to Queen Victoria from 1872, and was appointed a Companion of the Order of the Indian Empire (CIE).

Lord and Lady Mayo had seven children:

- Hon. Norah Mary (14 March 1850 – 23 May 1851), died in infancy
- Lady Eva Constance Aline Bourke (16 August 1858 – 19 January 1940), married Windham Wyndham-Quin, 5th Earl of Dunraven and Mount-Earl
- Dermot Robert Wyndham Bourke, 7th Earl of Mayo (2 July 1851 – 31 December 1927)
- Captain Hon. Sir Maurice Archibald Bourke (22 December 1853 – 16 September 1900)
- Hon. Algernon Henry Bourke (31 December 1854 – 7 April 1922)
- Lady Florence Blanche Madeline Bourke (16 August 1861 – 18 June 1953)
- Hon. Terence Theobald Bourke, OBE (2 April 1865 – 13 May 1923)

Following his assassination in 1872, Lord Mayo was succeeded in the Earldom and other titles by his eldest son, Dermot.

== Honours and Arms ==
=== Honours ===
Country	Date	Appointment	Ribbon	Post-nominals
United Kingdom	1852–1872	Privy Council		PC
United Kingdom	1852–1872	Privy Council of Ireland		PC (Ire)
United Kingdom	1868–1872	Knight of the Most Illustrious Order of St Patrick		KP
United Kingdom	1869–1872	Knight Grand Commander of the Most Exalted Order of the Star of India		GCSI

=== Arms ===
Coat of arms of Richard Bourke, 6th Earl of Mayo
Crest A Cat-a-Mountain sejant guardant proper, collared and chained Or. Escutcheon Party per fess Or and Ermine, a cross gules the first quarter charged with a lion rampant sable and the second with a dexter hand couped at the wrist and erect gules Supporters On either side a Chevalier in complete Armour, holding in the exterior hand a Pole-Axe, all proper. Motto A CRUCE SALUS (Salvation from the Cross) Orders Order of St Patrick; Order of the Star of India

== Ancestry ==
Ancestors of Richard Bourke, 6th Earl of Mayo

8. Joseph Bourke, 3rd Earl of Mayo
4. Hon. Richard Bourke
9. Elizabeth Meade
2. Robert Bourke, 5th Earl of Mayo
5. Frances Fowler
1. Robert Bourke, 1st Baron Connemara
12. Robert Jocelyn, 1st Earl of Roden
6. Hon. John Jocelyn
13. Lady Anne Hamilton
3. Anne Charlotte Jocelyn
14. Richard FitzGerald
7. Margaret FitzGerald

== See also ==
- House of Burgh, an Anglo-Norman and Hiberno-Norman dynasty founded in 1193
- Mayo College, Ajmer, India
- Mayo Hall, Allahabad, India
- Mayo Hall, Bangalore, India
- Mayo School of Arts, Lahore, British India
- Viceroy of India
- Mayo Hospital, Lahore, Pakistan

Parliament of the United Kingdom
Preceded by Richard More O'Ferrall; Robert Archbold	Member of Parliament for County Kildare; 1847 – March 1852; With: Marquess of Kildare	Succeeded by Willian Cogan; Marquess of Kildare
Preceded by John Boyd	Member of Parliament for Coleraine; 1852–1857	Succeeded by John Boyd
Preceded by Henry Wyndham; John Steel	Member of Parliament for Cockermouth; 1857–1868; With: John Steel to April 1868; Andrew Green Thompson from April 1868	Succeeded by Isaac Fletcher
Political offices
Preceded by Sir William Somerville, Bt	Chief Secretary for Ireland; 1852	Succeeded by Sir John Young, Bt
Preceded by Henry Arthur Herbert	Chief Secretary for Ireland; 1858–1859	Succeeded by Edward Cardwell
Preceded by Chichester Parkinson-Fortescue	Chief Secretary for Ireland; 1866–1868	Succeeded by John Wilson-Patten
Government offices
Preceded by Sir John Lawrence, Bt	Viceroy of India; 1869–1872	Succeeded by Sir John Strachey (acting)
Peerage of Ireland
Preceded by Robert Bourke	Earl of Mayo; 1867–1872	Succeeded by Dermot Bourke
