= Isaac Fletcher (British politician) =

- Born: 22 February 1827
- Died: 10 April 1879 (aged 51–52)
- Citizenship: United Kingdom
- Occupation: MP for Cockermouth
- Term: 17 November 1868 – 1 April 1879

Isaac Fletcher (22 February 1827 – 3 April 1879) was a British ironmaster and Liberal politician who sat in the House of Commons from 1868 to 1879. Fletcher committed suicide by revolver on Thursday, April 19, 1879.

== Personal life ==
Fletcher was born at Greysouthen, Cumberland, into a Quaker family, the son of John Wilson Fletcher. He was elected in the 1868 General Election as MP for Cockermouth as a moderate Liberal.

Isaac Fletcher had numerous business interests. He was (like his father and grandfather) a coalowner (a 'large colliery proprietor' according to the Yorkshire Post); like his brother William Fletcher (who succeeded him as MP for Cockermouth) he was a partner in the Clifton Colliery which, Whellan's The History and topography of the counties of Cumberland and Westmorland of 1860 noted, employed 600 hands, could raise up to 800 tons of coal a day and "the Workington harbour and the Cockermouth and Workington railway are both chiefly dependent for their revenue upon the Clifton Colliery". Fletcher was a Trustee of Workington Harbour, and a major shareholder in the Cockermouth and Workington Railway. The Fletchers also had interests in the local iron industry, and in quarries and mines supplying it with limestone and iron-ore. He acted as chairman of the Cockermouth, Keswick and Penrith Railway Company and of the Cumberland Mine-owners' Association and as deputy chairman of the West Cumberland Iron and Steel Company Ltd. He served as a justice of the peace for Cumberland, on the nomination of William Lowther, 2nd Earl of Lonsdale, the Conservative Lord Lieutenant of Cumberland; Fletcher later (when appealed to by a Conservative MP) defended the Earl against posthumous accusations of partisan bias in his appointments to the bench.

Fletcher had interests in science, particularly astronomy. He built a private observatory at Tarn Bank (his home in Cumberland) initially equipped with a 4¼-inch aperture telescope of 6-foot focal length. He purchased a 9½-inch refracting telescope of 12-foot focal length from Thomas Cooke and Sons in 1857. He was elected a fellow of the Royal Astronomical Society in 1849 and contributed sixteen papers to the Monthly Notices of the Royal Astronomical Society. Fletcher was elected a Fellow of the Royal Society in 1855. He was also a fellow of the Geological Society of London and established a network of rain-gauges in the Lake District, reporting annually the rainfall in the previous year. He supported the scheme for supplying Manchester with water from Thirlmere.

Fletcher had an interest in history and was a fellow of the Society of Antiquaries of London. He studied the history of the industries of Cumberland and in 1878 published a paper on "The Archaeology of the West Cumberland Coal Trade" in the Transactions of the Cumberland and Westmorland Antiquarian Society.

== Suicide ==
On 3 April 1879 Fletcher committed suicide by shooting himself in the forehead with a revolver at Morley's Hotel, Westminster. According to his brother, there were no financial, family or personal problems, but Fletcher's health was poor ('a great derangement of the liver') and he was averse to taking medical advice; on occasions he had seemed withdrawn, as he had done in his childhood before epileptic fits to which he had then been liable. The surgeon who examined the body, questioned by the coroner, advised that persons with epileptic tendencies could well be seized by a suicidal mania; the jury accordingly found that Fletcher had killed himself whilst of unsound mind. The Carlisle Patriot – opposed to Fletcher in politics – spoke of his 'amiable character, great attainments, and strong and vigorous intelligence'.

Parliament of the United Kingdom
Preceded by Andrew Green Thompson; Richard Bourke	Member of Parliament for Cockermouth; 1868 – 1879	Succeeded by William Fletcher
