= West Cumberland =

Parliamentary constituency in the United Kingdom, 1832–1885

- Former county constituency for the House of Commons
- Form 1832–1868 and this area was left intact until 1885. Extract from 1837 result: the 'doubly' blue coastal area at centre.

1832–1885
- Seats: two
- Created from: Cumberland
- Replaced by: Egremont and Cockermouth

West Cumberland was a county constituency in the House of Commons of the Parliament of the United Kingdom. It elected two Members of Parliament (MPs) by the bloc vote system of election.

== Boundaries ==
1832–1885: The Wards of Allerdale above Derwent and Allerdale below Derwent.

In 1832 the historic county of Cumberland, in north west England, was split for parliamentary purposes into two county divisions. These were the East Cumberland division (with a place of election at Carlisle) and the West division (where voting took place at Cockermouth). Each division returned two members to Parliament.

The parliamentary boroughs included in the West division, between 1832 and 1885, (whose non-resident 40 shilling freeholders voted in the county constituency) were Cockermouth and Whitehaven. (Source: Stooks Smith).

== History ==
For most of its existence this was an extremely Conservative division, in sharp contrast to the mostly Liberal inclined East division of the county. Only once, in the last election in 1880, was a Liberal MP elected.

The county began to industrialise from the 1860s. An Irish community developed in the west of Cumberland particularly at Cleator Moor, attracted by the opportunity to find work in the areas developing iron industry. It may be that these economic and demographic developments made the Liberals, critical of the remnant Anglican ascendancy, more competitive by 1880 than they had been earlier in the century.

In 1885 this division was abolished. The East and West Cumberland county divisions were replaced by four new single-member county constituencies. These were Cockermouth, Egremont (the Western division), Eskdale (Northern division) and Penrith (Mid division). In addition there were two remaining Cumberland borough constituencies; Carlisle and Whitehaven.

== Members of Parliament ==
Election	First member	First party	Second member	Second party
1832	William Lowther	Tory	Edward Stanley	Tory
1833 by-election	Samuel Irton	Tory	Edward Stanley	Tory
1834	Samuel Irton	Conservative	Edward Stanley	Conservative
1847	Henry Lowther	Conservative	Edward Stanley	Conservative
1852	Henry Lowther	Conservative	Samuel Irton	Conservative
1857	Henry Lowther	Conservative	Hon. Sir Henry Wyndham	Conservative
1860 by-election	Henry Lowther	Conservative	Hon. Percy Wyndham	Conservative
1872 by-election	Jocelyn Pennington ^{a}	Conservative	Hon. Percy Wyndham	Conservative
1880	David Ainsworth	Liberal	Hon. Percy Wyndham	Conservative
1885	Constituency abolished			

Note:-

- ^{a} Muncaster was a Peer of Ireland until 1898 and therefore eligible to serve in the House of Commons.

== Election results ==
=== Elections in the 1830s ===
General election 1832: West Cumberland
Party	Candidate	Votes	%
Tory	William Lowther	1,875	36.9
Tory	Edward Stanley	1,693	33.3
Whig	Henry Curwen	1,510	29.7
Majority		183	3.6
Turnout		3,266	84.9
Registered electors		3,848	
Tory win (new seat)			
Tory win (new seat)			

Lowther was also elected for Westmorland and opted to sit there, causing a by-election.

By-election, 25 March 1833: West Cumberland
Party	Candidate	Votes	%	±%
Tory	Samuel Irton	1,682	51.2	−19.0
Radical	Francis Aglionby	1,601	48.8	N/A
Majority		81	2.4	−1.2
Turnout		3,283	85.3	+0.4
Registered electors		3,848		
Tory hold		Swing	−19.0	

General election 1835: West Cumberland
Party	Candidate	Votes	%	±%
Conservative	Edward Stanley	1,899	35.4	+2.1
Conservative	Samuel Irton	1,883	35.1	−1.8
Radical	Francis Aglionby	1,581	29.5	N/A
Majority		302	5.6	+2.0
Turnout		3,469	83.6	−1.3
Registered electors		4,149		
Conservative hold		Swing	+2.1	
Conservative hold		Swing	−1.8	

General election 1837: West Cumberland
Party	Candidate	Votes	%
Conservative	Samuel Irton	Unopposed	
Conservative	Edward Stanley	Unopposed	
Registered electors		4,437	
Conservative hold			
Conservative hold			

=== Elections in the 1840s ===
General election 1841: West Cumberland
Party	Candidate	Votes	%	±%
Conservative	Samuel Irton	Unopposed		
Conservative	Edward Stanley	Unopposed		
Registered electors		4,031		
Conservative hold				
Conservative hold				

General election 1847: West Cumberland
Party	Candidate	Votes	%	±%
Conservative	Edward Stanley	Unopposed		
Conservative	Henry Lowther	Unopposed		
Registered electors		4,042		
Conservative hold				
Conservative hold				

=== Elections in the 1850s ===
General election 1852: West Cumberland
Party	Candidate	Votes	%	±%
Conservative	Samuel Irton	Unopposed		
Conservative	Henry Lowther	Unopposed		
Registered electors		4,144		
Conservative hold				
Conservative hold				

General election 1857: West Cumberland
Party	Candidate	Votes	%	±%
Conservative	Henry Wyndham	1,848	35.4	N/A
Conservative	Henry Lowther	1,825	34.9	N/A
Radical	Wilfrid Lawson	1,554	29.7	New
Majority		271	5.2	N/A
Turnout		3,391 (est)	77.2 (est)	N/A
Registered electors		4,389		
Conservative hold				
Conservative hold				

General election 1859: West Cumberland
Party	Candidate	Votes	%	±%
Conservative	Henry Wyndham	Unopposed		
Conservative	Henry Lowther	Unopposed		
Registered electors		4,780		
Conservative hold				
Conservative hold				

=== Elections in the 1860s ===
Wyndham's death caused a by-election.

By-election, 27 August 1860: West Cumberland
Party	Candidate	Votes	%	±%
Conservative	Percy Wyndham	Unopposed		
Conservative hold				

General election 1865: West Cumberland
Party	Candidate	Votes	%	±%
Conservative	Percy Wyndham	Unopposed		
Conservative	Henry Lowther	Unopposed		
Registered electors		4,602		
Conservative hold				
Conservative hold				

General election 1868: West Cumberland
Party	Candidate	Votes	%	±%
Conservative	Percy Wyndham	Unopposed		
Conservative	Henry Lowther	Unopposed		
Registered electors		5,676		
Conservative hold				
Conservative hold				

=== Elections in the 1870s ===
Lowther succeeded to the peerage, becoming Earl of Lonsdale and causing a by-election.

By-election, 26 March 1872: West Cumberland
Party	Candidate	Votes	%	±%
Conservative	Josslyn Pennington	Unopposed		
Conservative hold				

General election 1874: West Cumberland
Party	Candidate	Votes	%	±%
Conservative	Percy Wyndham	2,532	29.4	N/A
Conservative	Josslyn Pennington	2,520	29.3	N/A
Liberal	James William Ballantine Dykes	1,786	20.7	New
Liberal	David Ainsworth	1,771	20.6	New
Majority		734	8.6	N/A
Turnout		4,305 (est)	71.3 (est)	N/A
Registered electors		6,034		
Conservative hold		Swing	N/A	
Conservative hold		Swing	N/A	

=== Elections in the 1880s ===
General election 1880: West Cumberland
Party	Candidate	Votes	%	±%
Liberal	David Ainsworth	3,178	37.4	−3.9
Conservative	Percy Wyndham	2,686	31.6	+2.2
Conservative	Josslyn Pennington	2,624	30.9	+1.6
Majority		554	6.5	N/A
Turnout		5,864 (est)	78.2 (est)	+6.9
Registered electors		7,496		
Liberal gain from Conservative		Swing	−3.9	
Conservative hold		Swing		

== See also ==
- List of former United Kingdom Parliament constituencies

== Sources ==
- Boundaries of Parliamentary Constituencies 1885–1972, compiled and edited by F.W.S. Craig (Parliamentary Reference Publications 1972)
- British Parliamentary Election Results 1832–1885, compiled and edited by F.W.S. Craig (Macmillan Press 1977)
- The Parliaments of England by Henry Stooks Smith (1st edition published in three volumes 1844–50), second edition edited (in one volume) by F.W.S. Craig (Political Reference Publications 1973)
- Social Geography of British Elections 1885–1910. by Henry Pelling (Macmillan 1967)
- Who's Who of British Members of Parliament: Volume I 1832–1885, edited by M. Stenton (The Harvester Press 1976)
- Who's Who of British Members of Parliament, Volume II 1886–1918, edited by M. Stenton and S. Lees (Harvester Press 1978)
