= David Shotter =

British archaeologist and university lecturer (1939–2021)

Professor David C. A. Shotter FSA
- Born: David Colin Arthur Shotter; 1 March 1939
- Died: 22 May 2021 (aged 82)
- Citizenship: British

Academic background
- Education: King's College School, Wimbledon; University of Southampton (BA PhD)

Academic work
- Discipline: Classics
- Sub-discipline: Ancient Rome; Classical archaeology
- Institutions: Magee University College; University of Lancaster

David Colin Arthur Shotter (3 January 1939 – 22 May 2021) was a British archaeologist and Professor of Roman Imperial History at the University of Lancaster.

== Career ==
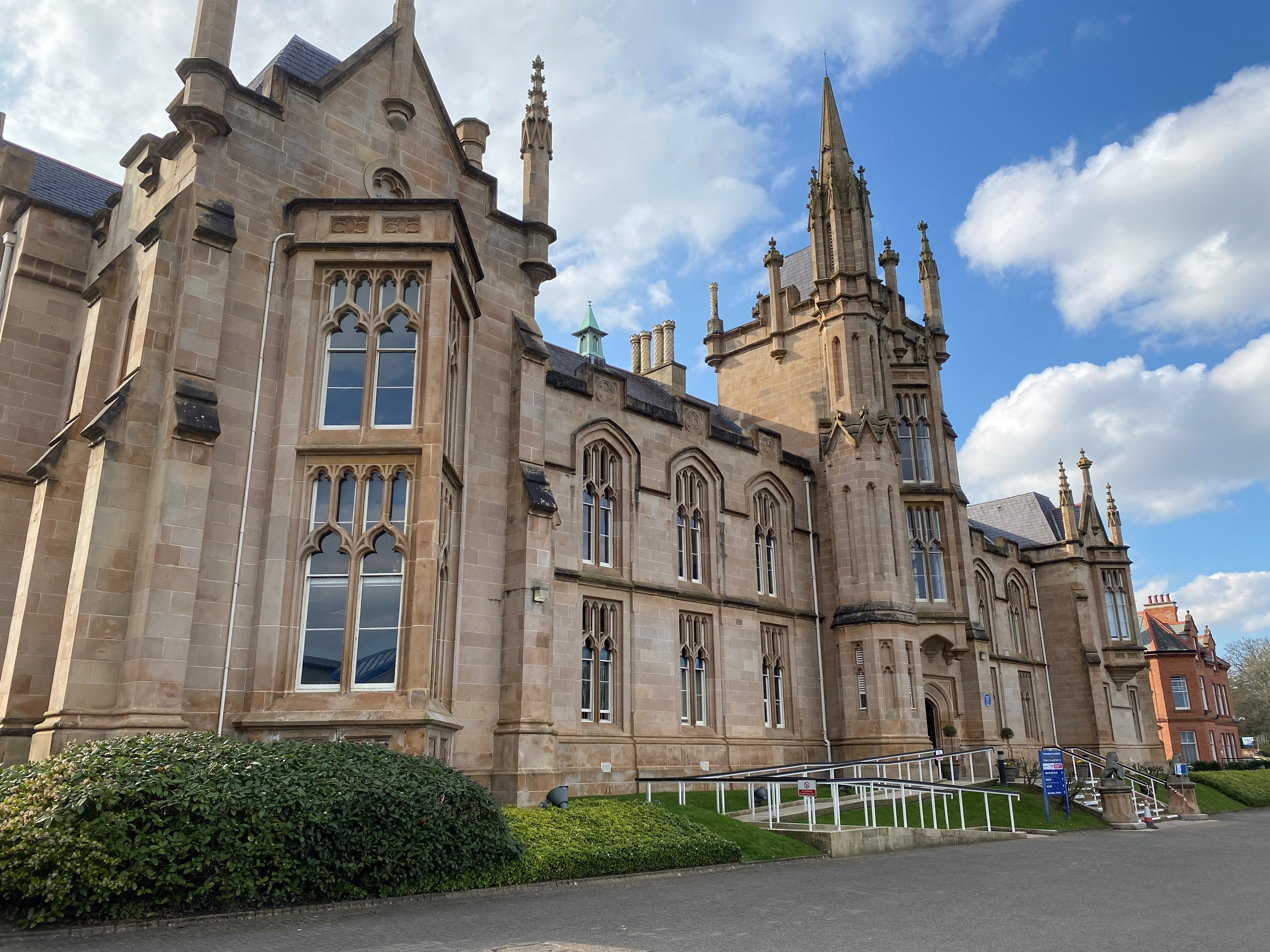
Magee University College

Shotter was born in London and educated at King's College School, London and the University of Southampton. He taught at Magee University College, Derry (now part of Ulster University) from 1964 to 1966 and was appointed Lecturer in the Department of Classics at the University of Lancaster in 1966.

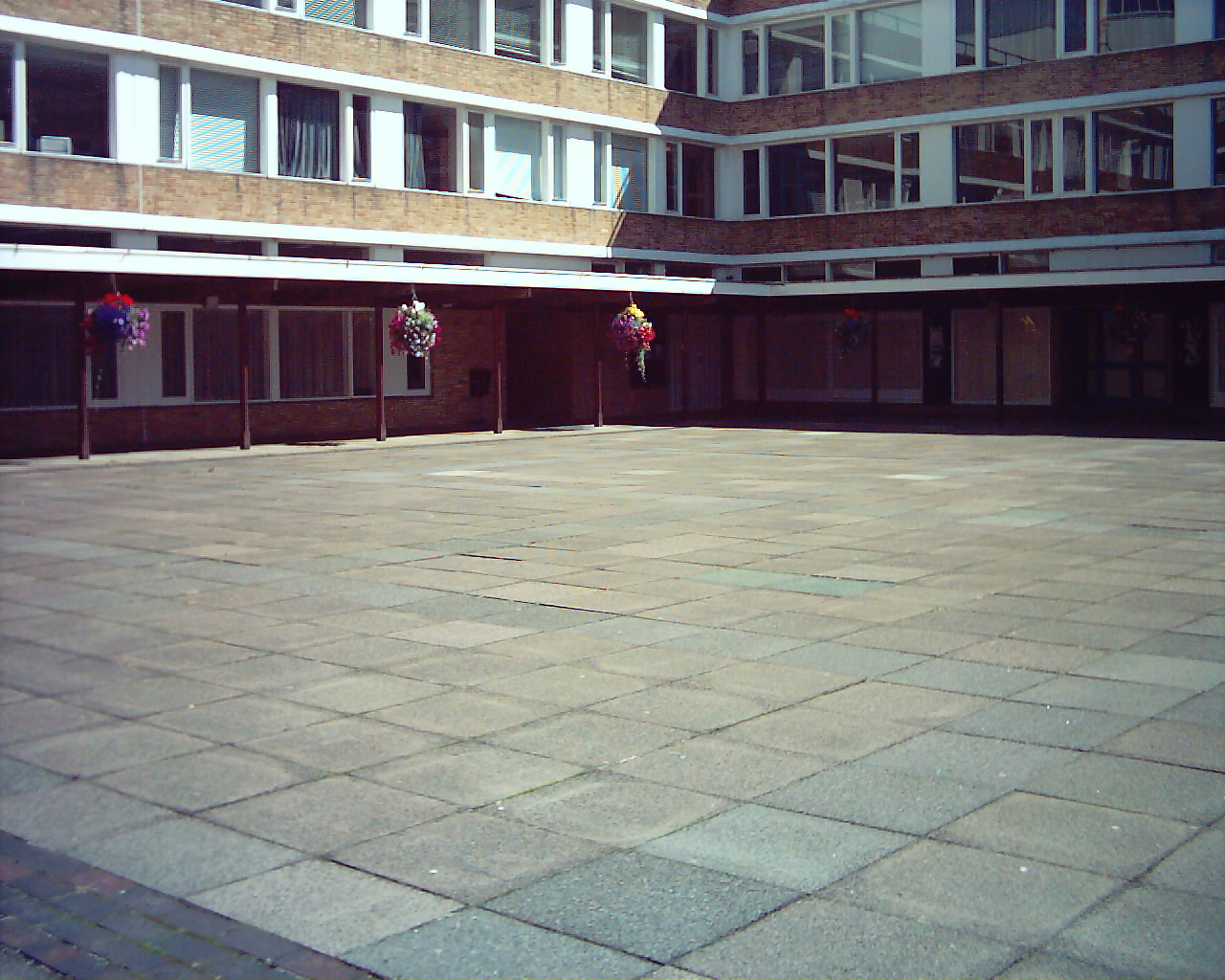
Old Quadrangle, Lonsdale College, Lancaster

He established and chaired over 40 annual archaeological conferences for the university's Centre for North-West Regional Studies. He was Principal of Lonsdale College, Lancaster and was appointed Professor of Roman Imperial History in 2003. He retired in 2004.

Shotter worked to establish the Cumbria and Lancashire Archaeological Unit (1979), which later became the LU Archaeological Unit (1986). He was a Fellow of the Society of Antiquaries.

He was a co-founder of the Lancaster Archaeological and Historical Society and its journal, Contrebis. He also played a major role in the Cumberland and Westmorland Antiquarian and Archaeological Society, as a council member, vice-president and president (2005-2008).

== Bibliography ==
- Shotter, D. C. A. (2008), Nero Caesar Augustus, London: Routledge, ISBN 978-1405-824-57-6
- Shotter, D. C. A.; McClintock, M. E. (2006), Serving the Region: A History of the North-West Regional Studies Centre at Lancaster University, 1970-2006, Lancaster: University of Lancaster, ISBN 978-1862-201-74-3
- Shotter, D. C. A. (2005), The Fall of the Roman Republic, Lancaster Pamphlets (2nd ed.), London: Routledge, ISBN 978-0415-319-40-9
- Shotter, D. C. A. (2005), Augustus Caesar, Lancaster Pamphlets in Ancient History (2nd ed.), London: Routledge, ISBN 978-0415-319-36-2
- Shotter, D. C. A. (2005), Nero, Lancaster Pamphlets (2nd ed.), London: Routledge, ISBN 978-0415-319-42-3
- Shotter, D. C. A. (2004), Roman Britain, Lancaster Pamphlets in Ancient History (2nd ed.), New York: Routledge, ISBN 978-0415-319-44-7
- Shotter, D. C. A. (2004), Tiberius Caesar, Lancaster Pamphlets, London: Routledge, ISBN 978-0415-319-46-1
- Shotter, D. C. A. (2004), Romans and Britons in North-West England, Lancaster: University of Lancaster, ISBN 978-1862-201-52-1
- Shotter, D. C. A. (2003), Rome and her Empire, London: Routledge, ISBN 978-0582-328-16-7
- Shotter, D. C. A. (2002), Ambleside Roman Fort, Grasmere: National Trust
- Shotter, D. C. A. (2000), Roman Coins from North-West England: Second Supplement, Lancaster: University of Lancaster, ISBN 978-1862-201-00-2
- Shotter, D. C. A. (1998), The Roman Fort and Town of Lancaster, Lancaster: University of Lancaster, ISBN 978-0901-272-80-5
- Shotter, D. C. A. (1996), The Roman Frontier in Britain: Hadrian's Wall, the Antonine Wall, and Roman policy in the North, Preston: Carnegie Publishing, ISBN 978-1859-360-15-6
- Shotter, D. C. A.; White, Andrew (1995), The Romans in Lunesdale, Lancaster: University of Lancaster, ISBN 978-0901800688
- Shotter, D.C.A. (1993), Suetonius, Lives of Galba, Otho, and Vitellius, Warminster: Aris and Phillips, ISBN 978-0856685385
- Shotter, D. C. A. (1989), Tacitus, Annals IV, Warminster: Aris and Phillips, ISBN 978-0856684043
- Shotter, D. C. A. (1984), Roman North-West England, Centre for North West Regional Studies: Occasional Paper No. 14, Lancaster: University of Lancaster, ISBN 0-901-272-09-4
