= Edward Stanley (1790–1863) =

British politician

Member of Parliament for West Cumberland
- In office 18 December 1832 – 13 July 1852 Serving with Henry Lowther (1847–1852); Samuel Irton (1833–1847); William Lowther (1832–1833)
- Preceded by: New constituency
- Succeeded by: Henry Lowther; Samuel Irton

Personal details
- Born: 1790
- Died: 19 August 1863 (aged 72–73)
- Party: Conservative/Tory

Edward Stanley (1790 – 19 August 1863) was a British Conservative and Tory politician.

Stanley was elected Tory Member of Parliament for West Cumberland at the 1832 general election and, becoming a Conservative in 1834, held the seat until 1852 when he did not seek re-election.

Parliament of the United Kingdom
New constituency	Member of Parliament for West Cumberland; 1832–1852; With: Henry Lowther (1847–1852); Samuel Irton (1833–1847); William Lowther (1832–1833)	Succeeded by Henry Lowther; Samuel Irton
