= Andrew Green Thompson =

Andrew Green Thompson MP

Member of Parliament for Cockermouth
- In office 27 April 1868 – 18 November 1868 Serving with Richard Bourke
- Preceded by: Richard Bourke; John Steel
- Succeeded by: Isaac Fletcher

Personal details
- Born: 1820
- Died: 26 April 1889 (aged 68)
- Party: Conservative

Major Andrew Green Thompson (1820 – 26 April 1889) was a British Conservative Party politician.

Green Thompson was elected MP for Cockermouth at a by-election in April 1868, but stood down shortly after at the next general election in November 1868.

Parliament of the United Kingdom
Preceded by Richard Bourke; John Steel	Member of Parliament for Cockermouth; April 1868–November 1868; With: Richard Bourke	Succeeded by Isaac Fletcher
