= Katherine Hodgson =

Cumbrian archaeologist

Katherine "Kate" Sophia Hodgson FSA (1889–1974) was an archaeologist whose primary research concerned the archaeology of Cumbria, North-West England. She was elected as a Fellow of the Society of Antiquaries in 1949, and served as president of the Cumberland and Westmorland Antiquarian and Archaeological Society between 1948 and 1951.

== Early life ==
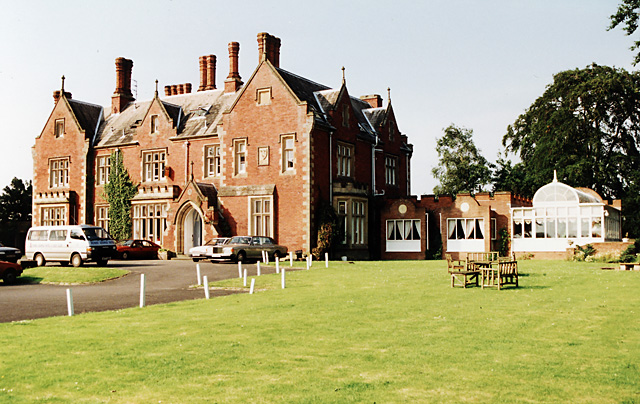
Newby Grange in 1991

Hodgson was the daughter of Thomas Hesketh Hodgson (died 1917), and Elizabeth Wilkinson (died 1935). Thomas worked as a civil servant for the Admiralty, and in 1876 inherited Newby Grange from his uncle W. N. Hodgson. Both her parents were actively involved with the work of the Cumberland Excavation Committee between 1894 and 1903.

== Archaeological research ==
Hodgson published her first paper jointly with her mother in 1910, in the Transactions of the Cumberland and Westmorland Antiquarian and Archaeological Society, and joined the Cumberland and Westmorland Antiquarian and Archaeological Society in 1918. She would later study at the Institute of Archaeology in London in the 1930s. In the 1937 list of members of the Society she is listed as living in London. In 1949 she was elected as a Fellow of the Society of Antiquaries. In her early research Hodgson was primarily interested in the Roman archaeology of Cumbria, particularly Hadrian's Wall. Later she developed an interest in the prehistory of Cumbria. She attended the inaugural international Congress of Roman Frontier Studies in 1949.

Hodgson was president of the Cumberland and Westmorland Antiquarian and Archaeological Society between 1948 and 1951, and chaired its council between 1955 and 1965. She was made an honorary member in 1962.

From 1950 until her death she lived at the Ridge House, Brampton, with Claudine Murray.

In an obituary published in The Times on 2 April 1974, Eric Birley wrote:

She was the most modest of people, and would never regard herself as more than a humble worker in her chosen field; but her enthusiasm was infectious, and there are a good many younger men and women who owe to her encouragement their interest in the archaeology of Cumberland and Westmorland.

Hodgson held a moiety in Crosby on Eden, which she gave to the Cumberland and Westmorland Antiquarian and Archaeological Society in her will.

== Selected publications ==
- Hodgson, E. W. and Hosgson, K. S. (1910) "Three Relics of the Seventeenth and Eighteenth Centuries." Transactions of the Cumberland & Westmorland Antiquarian & Archaeological Society 10 (series 2). Vol 10, pp. 85–90. doi:10.5284/1064141
- Hodgson, K. S., Richmond, I. A. and Simpson, F. Gerald. (1934). "II. New Turret Sites on the Line of the Turf Wall and the Type of Stone Wall afterwards associated with them." Transactions of the Cumberland & Westmorland Antiquarian & Archaeological Society 34 (series 2). Vol 34, pp. 130–137 doi:10.5284/1063133
- Richmond, I. A. and Hodgson, K. S. (1934). "Supplementary Report of the Cumberland Excavation Committee for 1933–34. Excavations at Castlesteads." Transactions of the Cumberland & Westmorland Antiquarian & Archaeological Society 34 (series 2). Vol 34, pp. 158–165. doi:10.5284/1063127
- Hodgson, K. S. (1935). "Notes on Stone Circles at Broomrigg, Grey Yauds, etc." Transactions of the Cumberland & Westmorland Antiquarian & Archaeological Society 35 (series 2). Vol 35, pp. 77–79. doi:10.5284/1063108
- St Joseph, K., Hodgson, K. S., Richmond, I. A. and Simpson, F. Gerald. (1936) "Report of the Cumberland Excavation Committee for 1935." Transactions of the Cumberland & Westmorland Antiquarian & Archaeological Society 36 (series 2). Vol 36, pp. 158–191. doi:10.5284/1063075
- Richmond, I. A. and Hodgson, K. S. (1936) "2. The Roman Temporary Camp at Watchcross." Transactions of the Cumberland & Westmorland Antiquarian & Archaeological Society 36 (series 2). Vol 36, p. 170.
- Richmond, I. A., Hodgson, K. S. and St joseph, K. (1938) "The Roman fort at Bewcastle." Transactions of the Cumberland & Westmorland Antiquarian & Archaeological Society 38 (series 2). Vol 38, pp. 195–237. doi:10.5284/1063026
- Hodgson, K. S. (1939) "Excavations at Askerton Park." Transactions of the Cumberland & Westmorland Antiquarian & Archaeological Society 39 (series 2). Vol 39, pp. 65–70. doi:10.5284/1063006
- Hodgson, K. S. (1940) "Some Excavations in the Bewcastle District." Transactions of the Cumberland & Westmorland Antiquarian & Archaeological Society 40 (series 2). Vol 40, pp. 154–166. doi:10.5284/1062978
- Hodgson, K. S. (1941) "Excavations at Measand." Transactions of the Cumberland & Westmorland Antiquarian & Archaeological Society 41 (series 2). Vol 41, pp. 207–208. doi:10.5284/1062955
- Hodgson, K. S. (1943) "Some Notes on the Prehistoric Remains of the Border District." Transactions of the Cumberland & Westmorland Antiquarian & Archaeological Society 43 (series 2). Vol 43, pp. 167–174. doi:10.5284/1062908
- Hodgson, K. S., Richmond, I. A., Birley, E. B., Hogg, R., Charlton, J. and Simpson, F. Gerald. (1947) "The Coastal Mile-Fortlet at Cardurnock." Transactions of the Cumberland & Westmorland Antiquarian & Archaeological Society 47 (series 2). Vol 47, pp. 78–127. doi:10.5284/1062828
- Hodgson, K. S. and Harper, K. (1950) "The prehistoric site at Broomrigg near Ainstable: the excavations of 1948–49." Transactions of the Cumberland & Westmorland Antiquarian & Archaeological Society 50 (series 2). Vol 50, pp. 30–42. doi:10.5284/1062769
- Hodgson, K. S. (1951) "A bronze axe from Ainstable." Transactions of the Cumberland & Westmorland Antiquarian & Archaeological Society 51 (series 2). Vol 51, pp. 172–173. doi:10.5284/1062729
- Hodgson, K. S. (1952) "Further excavations at Broomrigg, near Ainstable." Transactions of the Cumberland & Westmorland Antiquarian & Archaeological Society 52 (series 2). Vol 52, pp. 1–8. doi:10.5284/1062713
- Hodgson, K. S., Richmond, I. A. and Simpson, F. Gerald. (1952) "Turrets and milecastles between Burgh-by-Sands and Bowness-on-Solway." Transactions of the Cumberland & Westmorland Antiquarian & Archaeological Society 52 (series 2). Vol 52, pp. 14–16.
- Hodgson, K. S., Bouch, C. M L. and Bulman, C. G. (1953) "Lamonby farm: a clay house at Burgh-by-Sands." Transactions of the Cumberland & Westmorland Antiquarian & Archaeological Society 53 (series 2). Vol 53, pp. 149–159.
- Hodgson, K. S. (1953) "Four querns from the Brampton area." Transactions of the Cumberland & Westmorland Antiquarian & Archaeological Society 53 (series 2). Vol 53, pp. 209–211. doi:10.5284/1062663
- Hodgson, K. S. (1956) "Three unpublished collections of Bronze Age pottery: Netherhall, Garlands and Aglionby." Transactions of the Cumberland & Westmorland Antiquarian & Archaeological Society 56 (series 2). Vol 56, pp. 1–17. doi:10.5284/1062572
- Hodgson, K. S. (1956). "An Anglo-Saxon cremation-urn at Netherhall." Transactions of the Cumberland & Westmorland Antiquarian & Archaeological Society 56 (series 2). Vol 56, pp. 70–72. doi:10.5284/1062566
