= 1879 Cockermouth by-election =

UK Parliamentary by-election

The 1879 Cockermouth by-election was fought on 16 April 1879. The by-election took place due to the death of the incumbent Liberal MP, Isaac Fletcher. It was won by the Liberal candidate William Fletcher.

Cockermouth by-election, 1879
| Party | Candidate | Votes | % | ±% |
|---|---|---|---|---|
| Liberal | William Fletcher | 557 | 60.3 | +3.7 |
| Conservative | Mr. Rapley | 366 | 39.7 | −3.7 |
| Majority | | 191 | 20.6 | +7.4 |
| Turnout | | 923 | 83.8 | +0.8 |
| Liberal hold | | Swing | +3.7 | |
