= William Fletcher (English politician) =

William Fletcher MP

Member of Parliament for Cockermouth
- In office 18 April 1879 – 31 March 1880
- Preceded by: Isaac Fletcher
- Succeeded by: Edward Waugh

Personal details
- Born: 31 January 1831 Greysouthen, Cumberland, England, United Kingdom
- Died: 6 August 1900 (aged 69)
- Party: Liberal
- Spouse: Caroline Ashby (m. 1862)

William Fletcher (31 January 1831 – 6 August 1900) was a British Liberal Party politician. He was Liberal MP for Cockermouth for a short period between 1879 and 1880.

He was elected to the seat at the 1879 by-election, which was caused by his brother Isaac Fletcher's suicide.

Fletcher was one of the first directors of the Cockermouth, Keswick, and Penrith Railway, and chairman of Cleator and Workington Junction Railway. He also became a managing director of the West Cumberland Iron and Steel Company, and latterly the Alerdale Coal Company, as well as being chairman of the Moresby Coal Company.

He was also a Justice of the Peace for Cumberland.
