= Oliver Robinson, 2nd Marquess of Ripon =

British politician (1852–1923)

The Most Honourable The Marquess of Ripon GCVO FRS
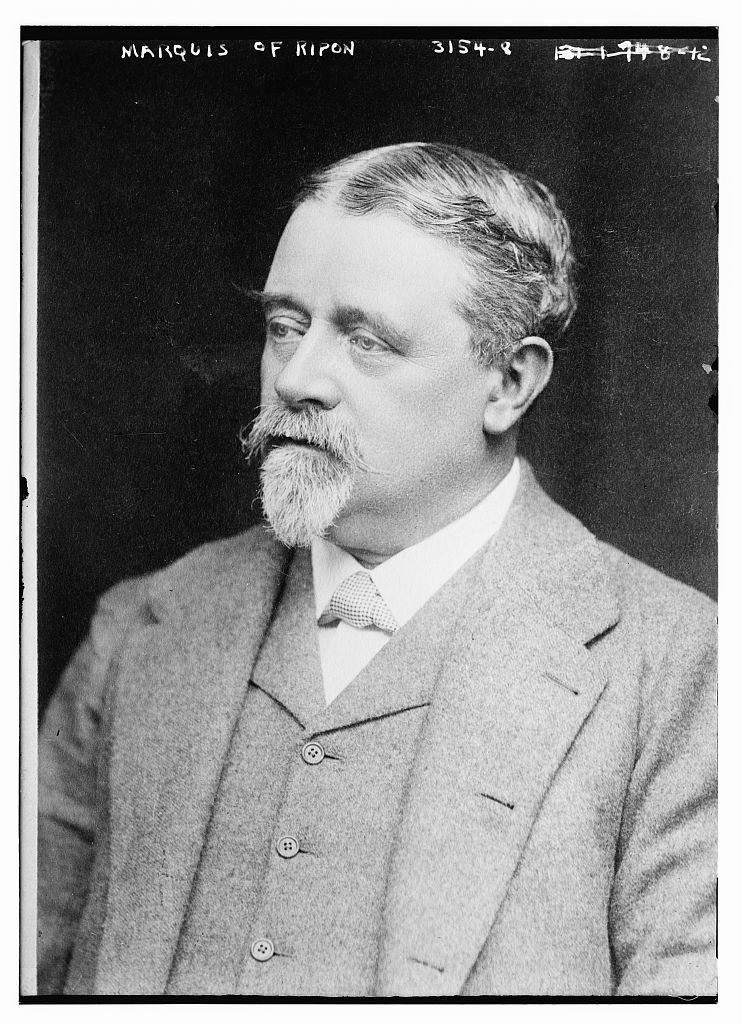
- Ripon c. 1905–10

Member of Parliament for Ripon
- In office 1874–1880
- Preceded by: Sir Henry Knight Storks
- Succeeded by: The Viscount Goschen

Personal details
- Born: 29 January 1852
- Died: 23 September 1923 (aged 71)
- Party: Liberal
- Spouse: Lady Gwladys Herbert (m. 1885; died 1917)
- Parents: George Robinson; Henrietta Vyner

Frederick Oliver Robinson, 2nd Marquess of Ripon, GCVO, FRS (29 January 1852 – 23 September 1923), styled Viscount Goderich between 1859 and 1871 and Earl de Grey between 1871 and 1909, was a British courtier and Liberal politician.

A descendant of Oliver Cromwell, Ripon was known from childhood as Oliver and not Frederick.

== Background ==
Robinson was the only son and only surviving child of George Robinson, 1st Marquess of Ripon and grandson of Prime Minister F. J. Robinson, 1st Earl of Ripon. His mother was Henrietta Anne Theodosia Vyner, daughter of Henry Vyner. He was educated at Eton College.

== Political career ==
Viscount Goderich was attached to the British commission sent, under his father's head, to Washington to settle the Alabama claims in 1871. Styled Earl de Grey after his father was elevated to a marquessate later in 1871, he entered Parliament for Ripon in 1874, a seat he held until 1880. A long time friend of King Edward VII, in July 1901 he was appointed Treasurer to Queen Alexandra. He was made a Knight Commander of the Royal Victorian Order (KCVO) in December 1901, and promoted to Knight Grand Cross (GCVO) in 1909 for his services as Treasurer to Queen Alexandra. In 1909 he succeeded his father in the marquessate and took his seat in the House of Lords.

He was Captain of the 27th West Riding of Yorkshire Volunteers in 1870, and JP for the counties of North and West Ridings and the Liberty of Ripon. He was also a trustee of the Wallace Collection and a supporter of the Royal Opera House.

== Sporting interests ==
Lord Ripon was a game shooter, who was noted to down 28 pheasants in sixty seconds at a shooting party guest on the Sandringham House estate. He also holds the record for the most bag of birds shot in a lifetime: 556,000, including 241,000 pheasants. It is believed that on one occasion, Lord Ripon was responsible for '...four birds dead in the air at once'.

== Marriage ==
Lord Ripon married Constance Gwladys Herbert, daughter of Sidney Herbert, 1st Baron Herbert of Lea and widow of St George Lowther, 4th Earl of Lonsdale, in 1885. She was a noted patron of the arts, friend among many other artists to Oscar Wilde and Nellie Melba. They had no children.

Edith Walker, the grandmother of the author Barbara Taylor Bradford, worked as a servant for the Marquess and lived in properties owned by him. She named two of her illegitimate children Freda and Frederick. Taylor Bradford's biographer, Piers Dudgeon, uncovered evidence that their father was the Marquess. Edith later lived in a workhouse.

== Death ==
Lady Ripon died in October 1917, aged 58. Lord Ripon survived her by nearly six years and died on 22 September 1923, aged 71, having collapsed on Dallowgill Moor near Studley Royal Park, after shooting 52 birds that morning. He was buried at St Mary's, Studley Royal on 26 September. There was no heir to the peerages and on his death the marquessate and his other titles became extinct.

== Arms ==
Coat of arms of Oliver Robinson, 2nd Marquess of Ripon
Crest Out of a coronet composed of fleurs-de-lis a mount vert thereon a stag at gaze gold. Escutcheon Vert a chevron between three stags at gaze or. Supporters On either side a greyhound reguardant sable. Motto Qualis ab incepto (The same as from the beginning). Orders The Royal Victorian Order - Knight Grand Cross (GCVO).

Parliament of the United Kingdom
Preceded by Sir Henry Knight Storks	Member of Parliament for Ripon; 1874–1880	Succeeded by George Goschen
Peerage of the United Kingdom
Preceded by George Frederick Samuel Robinson	Marquess of Ripon; 1909–1923	Extinct
