= Samuel Irton =

British politician

Member of Parliament for West Cumberland
- In office 13 July 1852 – 6 April 1857 Serving with Henry Lowther
- Preceded by: Henry Lowther; Edward Stanley
- Succeeded by: Henry Lowther; Henry Wyndham
- In office 25 March 1833 – 11 August 1847 Serving with Edward Stanley
- Preceded by: William Lowther; Edward Stanley
- Succeeded by: Henry Lowther; Edward Stanley

Personal details
- Born: 29 September 1796 Irton Hall, Cumberland, England
- Died: 10 July 1866 (aged 69)
- Party: Conservative
- Spouse: Eleanor Senhouse (m. 1825)
- Parent(s): Edmund Lamplugh Irton; Harriet Hayne
- Education: St John's College, Cambridge

Samuel Irton (29 September 1796 – 10 July 1866) was a British Conservative politician.

The only son of Edmund Lamplugh Irton and Harriet née Hayne, daughter of Richard Hayne, Irton was born at Irton Hall. He was first educated at Shrewsbury School, admitted during Michaelmas in 1814. He then was admitted to St John's College, Cambridge in February 1814. In 1825, he married Eleanor, daughter of Joseph Tiffin Senhouse, but they had no children. Upon his death in 1866, his estates were passed to his cousin Elizabeth Fell.

Irton was first elected Conservative MP for West Cumberland at a by-election in 1833—caused by William Lowther opting to sit for Westmorland—and held the seat until 1847 when he stood down. He returned for the seat at the 1852 and served for one further term until 1857, when he again stood down.

Outside of his political career, Irton was both a Justice of the Peace and a Deputy Lieutenant for Cumberland.

Parliament of the United Kingdom
Preceded by Henry Lowther; Edward Stanley	Member of Parliament for West Cumberland; 1852–1857; With: Henry Lowther	Succeeded by Henry Lowther; Henry Wyndham
Preceded by William Lowther; Edward Stanley	Member of Parliament for West Cumberland; 1833–1847; With: Edward Stanley	Succeeded by Henry Lowther; Edward Stanley
