= Dermot Bourke, 7th Earl of Mayo =

Irish peer (1851–1927)

The Right Honourable The Earl of Mayo KP PC (Ire)

Senator
- In office 11 December 1922 – 31 December 1927

Senate of Southern Ireland
- In office May 1921 – 27 May 1922

Member of the House of Lords
- Lord Temporal
- Representative Peer of Ireland; 14 July 1890 – 31 December 1927
- Preceded by: The 6th Earl of Milltown
- Succeeded by: None

Personal details
- Born: Dermot Robert Wyndham Bourke; 1 July 1851
- Died: 31 December 1927 (aged 76) London, England
- Spouse: Geraldine Sarah Ponsonby (m. 1885)
- Parent: Richard Bourke (father)
- Education: Eton College
- Military career
- Allegiance: United Kingdom
- Branch: British Army
- Units: 10th Hussars; Grenadier Guards

Dermot Robert Wyndham Bourke, 7th Earl of Mayo (English: /bɜːrk/; BURK; 2 July 1851 – 31 December 1927) was an Anglo-Irish peer, styled Lord Naas (/neɪs/; NAYSS) from 1867 to 1872, who served as an Irish representative peer in the British House of Lords (1890–1921) and member of the Senate of Southern Ireland (1921–1922) and Seanad Éireann (1922–1927).

== Life ==
He succeeded as Earl of Mayo on the assassination of his father Richard Bourke, 6th Earl of Mayo in 1872. He was educated at Eton, and was an officer in the 10th Hussars and the Grenadier Guards. In 1890 he was elected as an Irish representative peer and took his seat in the House of Lords. He was appointed a Knight of the Order of St Patrick on 3 February 1905.

He was one of the four landlord representatives during the 1902 Land Conference. Between 1921 and 1922 he served in the Senate of Southern Ireland. He was nominated by W. T. Cosgrave to the Seanad of the Irish Free State on its formation in 1922. He was nominated for 12 years and served until his death in 1927.

He owned 7,800 acres mostly in Kildare and Meath.

== Family ==
In 1885, he married Geraldine Sarah Ponsonby (b. 1863; d. 29 November 1944), who was the granddaughter of John Ponsonby, 4th Earl of Bessborough, and the great-granddaughter of George Coventry, 8th Earl of Coventry.

== Works ==
- Bourke, Dermot (1876). Sport in Abyssinia: Or The Mareb And Tackazzee. London: John Murray.

== Honours and Arms ==
=== Honours ===
Country	Date	Appointment	Ribbon	Post-nominals
United Kingdom	1905–1922	Privy Council of Ireland		PC (Ire)
United Kingdom	1905–1922	Knight of the Most Illustrious Order of St Patrick		KP

== Ancestry ==
Ancestors of Dermot Bourke, 7th Earl of Mayo

8. Hon. Richard Bourke
4. Robert Bourke, 5th Earl of Mayo
9. Frances Fowler
2. Richard Bourke, 6th Earl of Mayo
10. Hon. John Jocelyn
5. Anne Charlotte Jocelyn
11. Margaret FitzGerald
1. Dermot Bourke, 7th Earl of Mayo
12. George Wyndham, 3rd Earl of Egremont
6. George Wyndham, 1st Baron Leconfield
13. Elizabeth Ilive
3. Blanche Julia Wyndham
14. William Blunt
7. Mary Fanny Blunt

=== Arms ===
Coat of arms of Dermot Bourke, 7th Earl of Mayo
Crest A Cat-a-Mountain sejant guardant proper, collared and chained Or. Escutcheon Party per fess Or and Ermine, a cross gules the first quarter charged with a lion rampant sable and the second with a dexter hand couped at the wrist and erect gules Supporters On either side a Chevalier in complete Armour, holding in the exterior hand a Pole-Axe, all proper. Motto A CRUCE SALUS (Salvation from the Cross) Orders Order of St Patrick

== See also ==
- House of Burgh, an Anglo-Norman and Hiberno-Norman dynasty founded in 1193

Parliament of the United Kingdom
Preceded by The Earl of Milltown	Representative peer for Ireland; 1890–1927	Succeeded by Position lapsed
Peerage of Ireland
Preceded by Richard Bourke	Earl of Mayo; 1872–1927	Succeeded by Walter Bourke
