= Gwladys Robinson, Marchioness of Ripon =

British patron of the arts (1859-1917)

The Most Honourable The Marchioness of Ripon
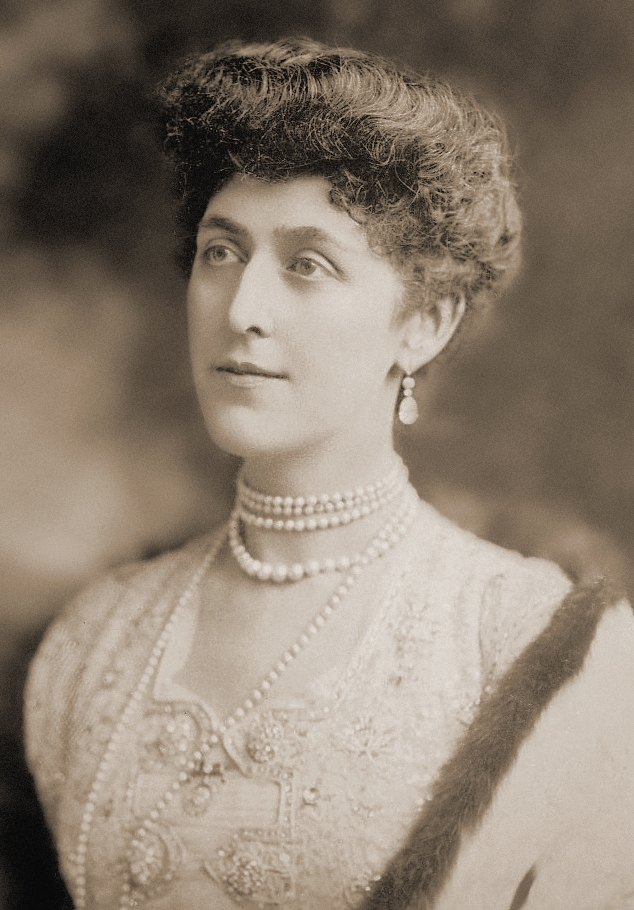
- The Marchioness of Ripon
- Born: 22 April 1859
- Died: 28 October 1917 (aged 58)
- Spouse(s): St George Lowther (m. 1878; died 1882) Oliver Robinson (m. 1885–1917)
- Children: 1
- Parents: Sidney Herbert (father); Elizabeth Herbert (mother)
- Relatives: George Herbert (paternal grandfather); Catherine Woronzow (paternal grandmother); Friedrich von Hügel (brother-in-law); George Robert Charles Herbert (brother); Hubert Parry (brother-in-law); Sidney Herbert (brother); Michael Henry Herbert (brother); Sir Sidney Herbert, 1st Baronet (nephew)

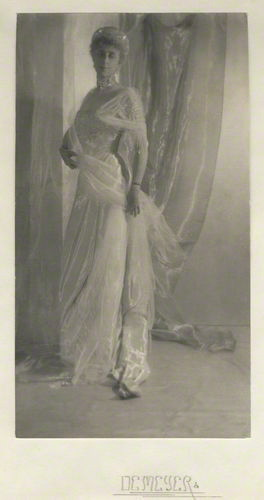
The Marchioness of Ripon by Adolf de Meyer,1910

Constance Gwladys Robinson, Marchioness of Ripon (22 April 1859 – 28 October 1917), was a British patron of the arts. She was a close friend of Oscar Wilde, who dedicated his play A Woman of No Importance to her; other celebrated friends included Nellie Melba, whose success in London was largely due to Lady Ripon's support, Nijinsky and Diaghilev.

== Biography ==
She was born in 1859 to Sidney Herbert, 1st Baron Herbert of Lea and his wife, Elizabeth, a writer and notable convert to Catholicism. She married St George Lowther, 4th Earl of Lonsdale, and had a daughter, Gladys Mary Juliet. After Lonsdale's death she married Oliver Robinson, 2nd Marquess of Ripon in 1885, then known by his courtesy title of Earl de Grey. She was thus known as Lady de Grey until her husband succeeded to his marquisate in 1909, when she became Marchioness of Ripon. They had no children.

Lady Ripon was a patron of the arts, supporting the restoration of the Royal Opera House, Covent Garden. When Jean and Édouard de Reszke were in London to perform at the Royal Opera House, she often entertained them during which she treated them like royal family members. She exerted great influence through the impresario Augustus Harris, because of her ability to persuade important people to purchase season tickets in advance.

She died in October 1917, aged 58. Lord Ripon survived her by six years and died in September 1923, aged 71. They are buried together in the Ripon family tomb at Studley Royal Church.

== Family ==
Ripon's paternal grandparents were George Herbert, 11th Earl of Pembroke, and the Russian-born Countess Catherine Woronzow (or Vorontsov), daughter of the Russian ambassador to Britain, Semyon Romanovich Vorontsov. Her mother was the granddaughter of Sir William à Court, 1st Baronet.

Most of her six siblings were notable:

1. Mary Catherine Herbert (1849–1935), who married, in 1873, the modernist theologian, Baron Friedrich von Hügel.
2. George Robert Charles Herbert (1850–1895), who became the 13th Earl of Pembroke.
3. Elizabeth Maud Herbert (1851–1933), who married, in 1872, the composer, Sir Charles Hubert Parry.
4. Sidney Herbert (1853–1913), a Member of Parliament, who succeeded his brother as the 14th Earl of Pembroke.
5. William Reginald Herbert (1854–1870), lost at sea aboard HMS Captain.
6. Michael Henry Herbert (The Hon. Sir Michael Herbert, KCMG, CB, PC) (1857–1904), a diplomat who ended his career as British ambassador to the U.S. in Washington, D.C., after whom the town of Herbert in Saskatchewan, Canada, is named. One of his sons was Sir Sidney Herbert, 1st Baronet.
