= Edward Waugh =

English lawyer and politician

Edward Waugh (1816 – 26 March 1891) was an English solicitor and Liberal politician who sat in the House of Commons from 1880 to 1885.

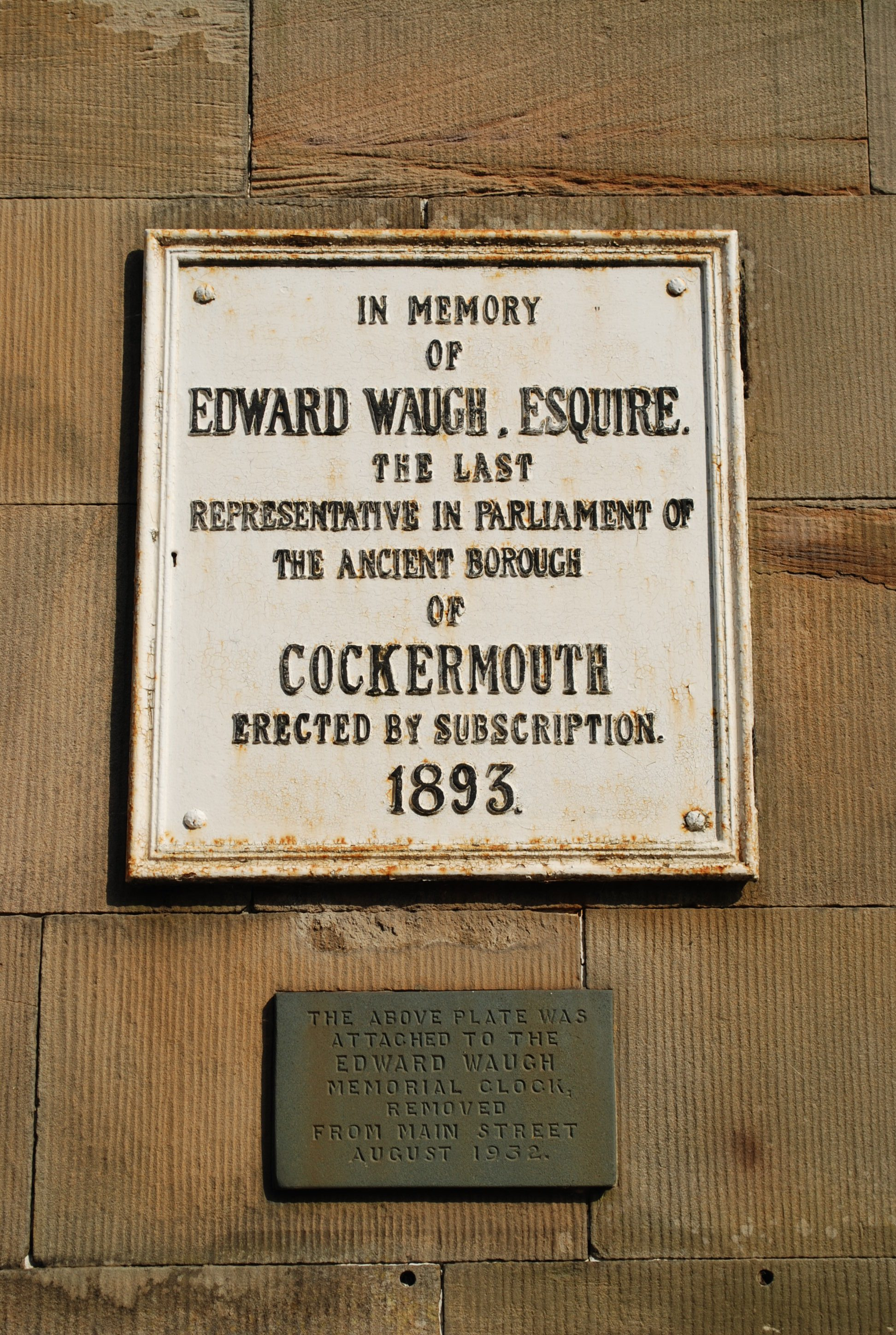
Plaque in Cockermouth

Waugh was the son of John Lamb Waugh of Seat Hill, Irthington, Cumberland and his wife Catherine Miles, daughter of Richard Miles of Pates Hill, Irthington. He was admitted solicitor in 1840 and eventually became head of the legal firm of E and E L Waugh and Musgrove of Cockermouth. He was one time Registrar of the County Court and Clerk to the magistrates.

At the 1880 general election, Waugh was elected as Member of Parliament (MP) for Cockermouth, replacing the Liberal William Fletcher who had been elected at a by-election in 1879. At the 1885 general election, the town of Cockermouth ceased to be a parliamentary borough, and the name was transferred to a new county division. Waugh did not contest the new constituency.

Waugh married Mary Liddell, daughter of Thomas Liddell of Carlisle in 1843.

Parliament of the United Kingdom
Preceded by William Fletcher	Member of Parliament for Cockermouth; 1880 – 1885	Succeeded by Charles James Valentine
