= Henry Wyndham (British Army officer) =

British military officer and politician (1790–1860)

General Sir Henry Wyndham KCB
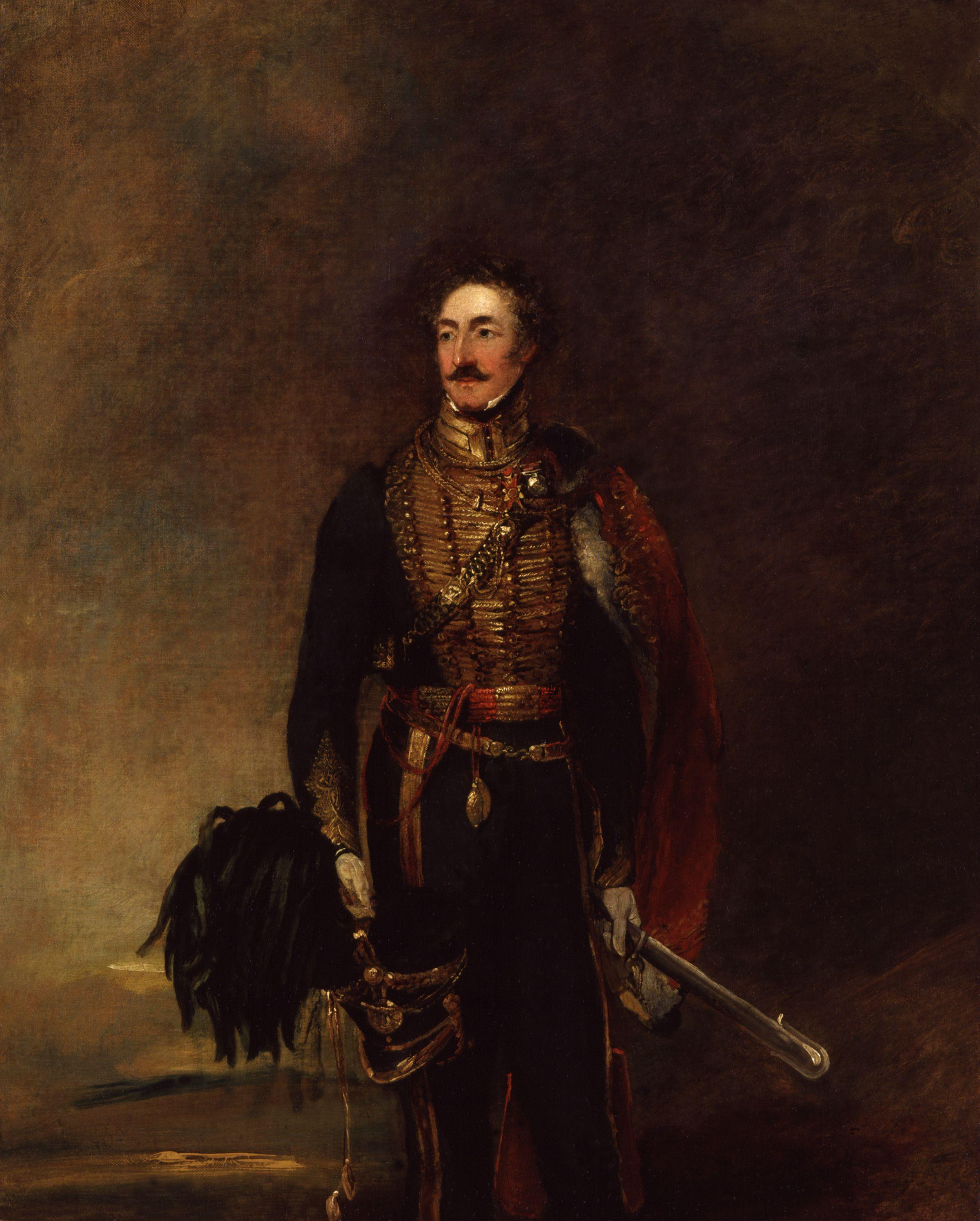
- Portrait by William Salter, National Portrait Gallery
- Born: 12 May 1790
- Died: 3 August 1860 (aged 70)

General Sir Henry Wyndham KCB (12 May 1790 – 3 August 1860) was a British Army officer and Conservative Party politician. He was Member of Parliament (MP) for Cockermouth from 1852 to 1857 and for West Cumberland from 1857 until his death in 1860.

Wyndham was the second son of George Wyndham, 3rd Earl of Egremont (1751–1837) and his mistress Elizabeth Ilive (died 1822), of Petworth House, near Chichester, West Sussex, and a descendant of John Wyndham who played an important role in the establishment of defence organisation in the West Country against the threat of Spanish invasion.

As a young officer, then-Captain (Guards officers held 'double' rank, so a Captain was also a Lieutenant-Colonel) Henry Wyndham fought at the Battle of Waterloo in 1815, where he was severely injured. He had taken part in the famous closing of the gates at Hougoumont and was said to have been so disturbed by the incident that he would never again close a door, preferring to sit in a room in a howling draught. During the battle, his life had been saved by Corporal James Graham, the soldier responsible for slotting the bar home after the North Gate was shut.

Pictures of the battles of Vitoria and Waterloo were commissioned by Wyndham's father from George Jones, RA. They hung in the Beauty Room of Petworth House, but have been moved to the Oak Staircase.

Parliament of the United Kingdom
Preceded by Edward Horsman; Henry Aglionby	Member of Parliament for Cockermouth; 1852–1857; With: Henry Aglionby 1852–1854; John Steel 1854–1857	Succeeded by Lord Naas; John Steel
Preceded by Samuel Irton; Henry Lowther	Member of Parliament for West Cumberland; 1857–1860; With: Henry Lowther	Succeeded by Henry Lowther; Percy Scawen Wyndham
Military offices
Preceded by The Earl Cathcart	Colonel of the 11th (Prince Albert's Own); Regiment of (Light) Dragoons (Hussars); 1847–1860	Succeeded by The Earl of Cardigan
