= 1872 West Cumberland by-election =

UK Parliamentary by-election

The 1872 West Cumberland by-election was fought on 26 March 1872. The by-election was fought due to the Succession to a peerage of the incumbent MP of the Conservative Party, Henry Lowther. It was won by the Conservative candidate The Lord Muncaster, who was unopposed.
