= Charles James Valentine =

English ironmaster and politician (1837–1900)

Charles James Valentine (September 1837 – 1900) was an English ironmaster and a Conservative politician.

Valentine was born at Mossley, Lancashire, the son of James Valentine, of Stockport and his wife Mary Bradbury. He was educated privately and became an ironmaster in Cumberland. He was managing director of the Moss Bay Hematite Iron and Steel Co., Limited, and Director of Cleator and Workington Junction Railway which was built to serve the iron works. He was lieutenant in the 1st Volunteer Battalion Border Regiment, and a J.P. for Cumberland.

In the 1885 general election, Valentine was elected as Member of Parliament (MP) for Cockermouth but retired and did not contest the 1886 general election.

Valentine married Anne Kirk of Chapel-en-le-Frith, Derbyshire in 1861. They lived at Bank Field House, Workington, Cumberland.

Parliament of the United Kingdom
| Preceded by Edward Waugh | Member of Parliament for Cockermouth; 1885 – 1886 | Succeeded by Sir Wilfred Lawson |
