= St George Lowther, 4th Earl of Lonsdale =

British noble (1855–1882)

The Right Honourable St George Lowther
- Earl of Lonsdale
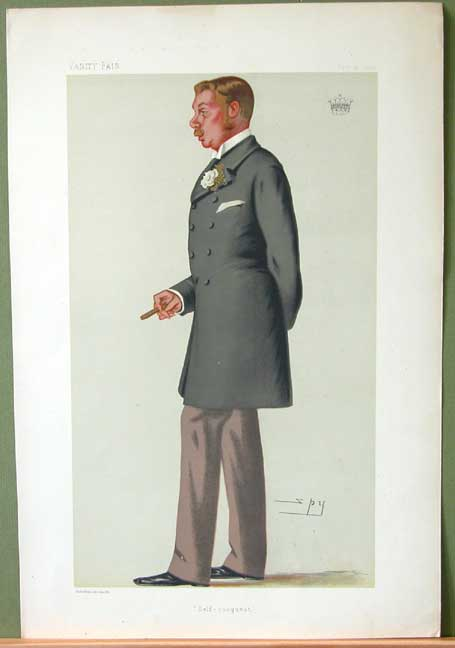
- "Self-conquest". Caricature by Spy published in Vanity Fair in 1879

- Coat of arms
- Tenure: 1876–1882
- Predecessor: Henry Lowther, 3rd Earl of Lonsdale
- Successor: Hugh Lowther, 5th Earl of Lonsdale
- Born: 4 October 1855
- Died: 8 February 1882 (aged 26)
- Spouse: Hon. Gwladys Herbert (m. 1878)
- Issue: Lady Juliet Lowther
- Father: Henry Lowther, 3rd Earl of Lonsdale
- Mother: Emily Caulfeild

St George Henry Lowther, 4th Earl of Lonsdale (4 October 1855 – 8 February 1882) was a British nobleman, the eldest son of Henry Lowther, 3rd Earl of Lonsdale and Emily Caulfeild. From 1872 until his succession to the earldom in 1876, he was styled Viscount Lowther.

== Life ==
His racehorse Pilgrimage won both the One Thousand Guineas and the Two Thousand Guineas in 1878. He was a captain in the part-time Westmorland and Cumberland Yeomanry, and was honorary colonel of the Royal Cumberland Militia. He suffered from illness, possibly exacerbated by alcoholism, and died relatively young in 1882. He was succeeded in the earldom by his younger brother, Hugh.

== Marriage and issue ==
He married the Honourable Constance Gwladys Herbert, third daughter of the Victorian statesman Lord Herbert of Lea and sister of two earls of Pembroke, on 6 July 1878. They had one daughter:

- Lady (Gladys Mary) Juliet Lowther (9 April 1881 – 23 September 1965), married Sir Robert Duff, 2nd Baronet (d. 16 October 1914) on 9 June 1903; married secondly Keith Trevor on 12 June 1919, divorced 1926. She had issue, one son Sir Michael Duff, 3rd Baronet of Vaynol, and a daughter Victoria (who had issue), by her first marriage.

His widow married secondly, on 7 May 1885, Frederick Robinson, 2nd Marquess of Ripon and died on 27 October 1917.

Peerage of the United Kingdom
Preceded by Henry Lowther	Earl of Lonsdale; 1876–1882	Succeeded by Hugh Lowther
