= Cockermouth (constituency) =

Parliamentary constituency in the United Kingdom, 1868–1918

Cockermouth division of Cumberland
- Former county constituency for the House of Commons

1885–1918
- Created from: West Cumberland and Cockermouth
- Replaced by: Workington and Penrith and Cockermouth

1641–1885
- Created from: Cumberland
- Replaced by: Cockermouth

1295–1295
- Created from: Cumberland
- Replaced by: Cumberland

Cockermouth was the name of a constituency of the House of Commons of the Parliament of England in 1295, and again from 1641, then of the Parliament of Great Britain from 1707 to 1800 and of the Parliament of the United Kingdom from 1801 to 1918. It was a parliamentary borough represented by two Members of Parliament until 1868, and by one member from 1868 to 1885. The name was then transferred to a county constituency electing one MP from 1885 until 1918.

Notable MPs have included the regicide, Francis Allen.

== The borough constituency (until 1885) ==
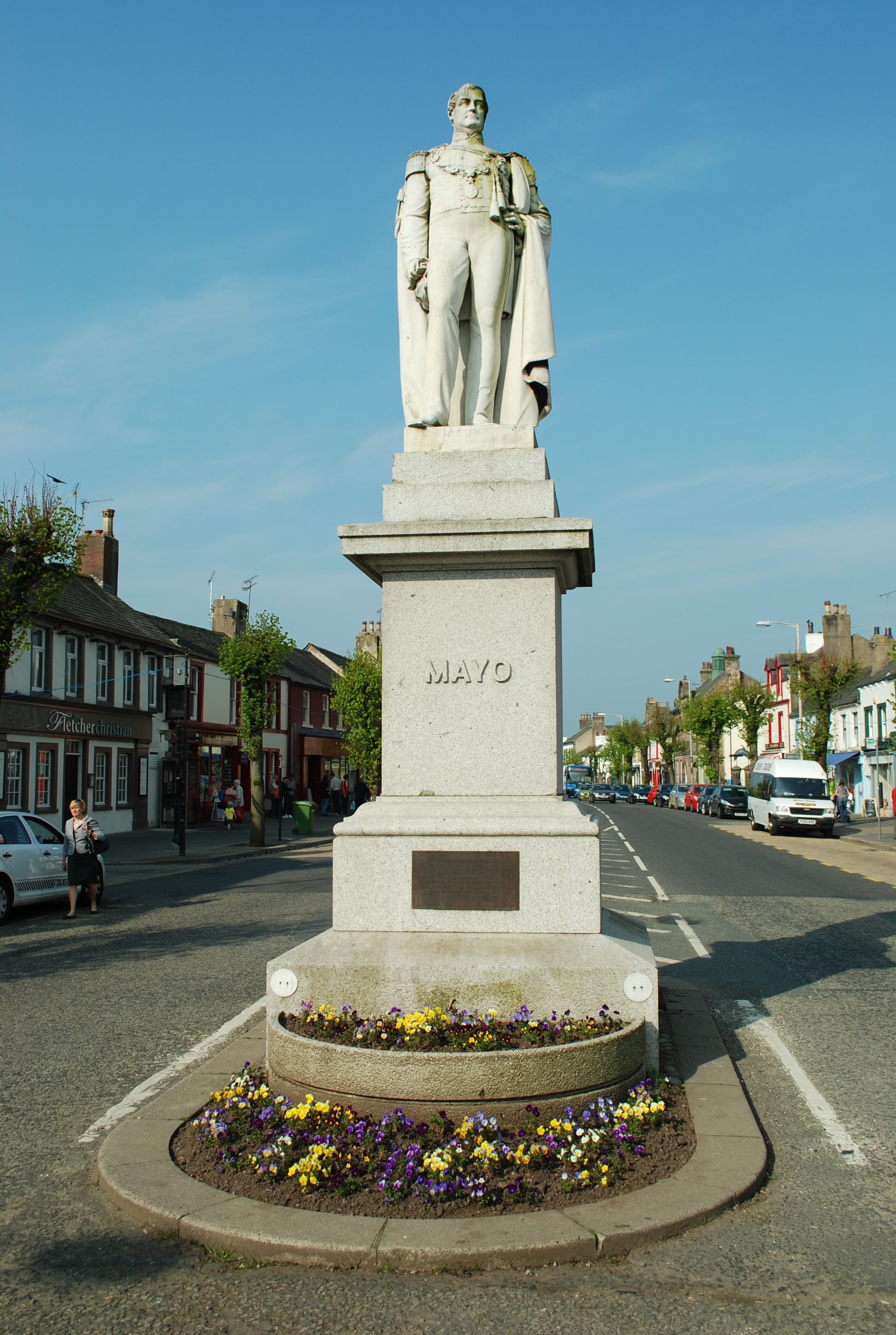
Richard Bourke, 6th Earl of Mayo

Until the Great Reform Act 1832, the constituency consisted solely of the market town of Cockermouth in Cumberland. It first returned members to the Model Parliament of 1295, but its franchise then seems to have lapsed until 1641, when the Long Parliament passed a resolution (15 February 1641) to restore its ancient privileges.

The right of election in Cockermouth was vested in the burgage tenants of the borough, of whom there were about 300 in 1832. Cockermouth was considered a pocket borough, with the vast majority of the voters being under the influence of the Lowther family.

At the time of the 1831 census, the borough included just over 1,000 houses and had a population of 4,536. The Reform Act 1832 expanded the boundaries to bring in the neighbouring parishes of Eaglesfield, Brigham, Papcastle and Bridekirk, and part of Dovenby, increasing the population to 6,022 and encompassing 1,325 houses. This made the borough big enough to retain both its members. However, in the next wave of reform, introduced at the 1868 general election, one of Cockermouth's two seats was withdrawn, and in 1885 the borough was abolished altogether, although the name was transferred to the surrounding county constituency.

== The county constituency (1885-1918) ==
The Cockermouth constituency created in 1885, strictly speaking The Cockermouth Division of Cumberland, was a compact division stretching westwards from Cockermouth to the sea, and including the much larger town of Workington. There was a significant Irish vote, and the Conservative victory in 1885 and subsequent Liberal gain of the seat in 1886 have been attributed to Parnell's shift of support from the one party to the other.

The constituency was divided between the new Workington and Penrith and Cockermouth divisions of Cumberland from 1918.

== Members of Parliament ==
Cockermouth re-enfranchised by Parliament in Nov 1640

=== MPs 1641–1868 ===
Year	First member	First party	Second member	Second party
1641	Sir John Fenwick, Bt	Parliamentarian	Sir John Hippisley	Parliamentarian
1642	Seat vacant through double return		Sir John Hippisley	Parliamentarian
1645	Francis Allen		Sir John Hippisley	Parliamentarian
1653	Cockermouth was unrepresented in the Barebones Parliament and the First and Second Parliaments of the Protectorate			
January 1659	John Stapleton		Wilfrid Lawson	
May 1659	Not represented in the restored Rump			
1660	Richard Tolson		Sir Wilfrid Lawson	
1661	Hugh Potter		Sir Wilfrid Lawson	
1662	Robert Scawen		Sir Wilfrid Lawson	
1670	John Clarke		Sir Wilfrid Lawson	
1675	Sir Richard Grahme		Sir Wilfrid Lawson	
1679	Sir Richard Grahme		Sir Orlando Gee	
1685	Sir Daniel Fleming		Sir Orlando Gee	
1689	Sir Henry Capell		Henry Fletcher	
1690	Sir Orlando Gee		Sir Wilfrid Lawson	
1695	Sir Charles Gerard		Goodwin Wharton	Whig
1698	George Fletcher	Whig	William Seymour	
1701	Goodwin Wharton	Whig	William Seymour	
February 1702	Thomas Lamplugh		William Seymour	
July 1702	Thomas Lamplugh		James Stanhope	Whig
1708	Albemarle Bertie		James Stanhope	Whig
1710	Nicholas Lechmere		James Stanhope	Whig
1713	Nicholas Lechmere		Joseph Musgrave	
1715	Nicholas Lechmere		James Stanhope	Whig
April 1717	Nicholas Lechmere		Sir Thomas Pengelly	
July 1717	Lord Percy Seymour		Sir Thomas Pengelly	
1721	Anthony Lowther		Sir Thomas Pengelly	
1722	Sir Wilfrid Lawson		Sir Thomas Pengelly	
1727	Sir Wilfrid Lawson		William Finch	
1734	Sir Wilfrid Lawson		William Finch	
1738	Eldred Curwen		William Finch	
1741	Sir John Mordaunt		William Finch	
July 1747	Sir John Mordaunt		Sir Charles Wyndham	
December 1747	Sir John Mordaunt		William Finch	
1754	Sir John Mordaunt		Percy Wyndham-O'Brien	
1761	Sir John Mordaunt		Charles Jenkinson	
1767	Sir John Mordaunt		Captain John Elliot, RN	
March 1768	Charles Jenkinson		Sir George Macartney	
May 1768	Captain George Johnstone, RN	Independent	Sir George Macartney	
1769	Captain George Johnstone, RN	Independent	Sir James Lowther	
1774	Captain George Johnstone, RN	Independent	Fletcher Norton	
1775	Ralph Gowland		James Adair	
1780	John Baynes Garforth	Tory	John Lowther	Tory
1784	James Clarke Satterthwaite	Tory	John Lowther	Tory
1786	James Clarke Satterthwaite	Tory	Humphrey Senhouse	Tory
1790	John Baynes Garforth	Tory	Sir John Anstruther, 1st and 4th Baronet	Tory
1796	John Baynes Garforth	Tory	Edward Burrow	Tory
1800	John Baynes Garforth	Tory	Walter Spencer-Stanhope	Tory
1802	James Graham	Tory	Robert Plumer Ward	Tory
1805	Viscount Garlies	Tory	Robert Plumer Ward	Tory
1806	John Lowther	Tory	James Graham	Tory
January 1807	Lord Binning	Tory	James Graham	Tory
May 1807	John Lowther	Tory	James Graham	Tory
July 1807	John Osborn	Tory	James Graham	Tory
1808	Viscount Lowther	Tory	James Graham	Tory
October 1812	Viscount Lowther	Tory	John Lowther	Tory
December 1812	Viscount Lowther	Tory	Augustus Foster	Tory
1813	Viscount Lowther	Tory	Thomas Wallace	Tory
1816	John Lowther	Tory	Thomas Wallace	Tory
1818	John Lowther	Tory	Sir John Beckett	Tory
1821	John Lowther	Tory	William Wilson Carus Wilson	Tory
1826	Viscount Garlies	Tory	William Wilson Carus Wilson	Tory
1827	Viscount Garlies	Tory	Laurence Peel	Tory
1830	Viscount Garlies	Tory	Philip Pleydell-Bouverie	Whig
1831	John Lowther	Tory	Sir James Scarlett	Tory
1832	Henry Aglionby Aglionby	Radical	Fretchville Lawson Ballantine Dykes	Whig
1836	Henry Aglionby Aglionby	Radical	Edward Horsman	Whig
1852	Henry Aglionby Aglionby	Radical	Henry Wyndham	Conservative
1854	John Steel	Radical	Henry Wyndham	Conservative
1857	John Steel	Radical	Lord Naas	Conservative
1859	John Steel	Liberal	Lord Naas	Conservative
April 1868	Andrew Green Thompson	Conservative	Lord Naas	Conservative
1868	Representation reduced to one member			

=== MPs 1868–1885 ===
Election	Member	Party
1868	Isaac Fletcher	Liberal
1879 by-election	William Fletcher	Liberal
1880	Edward Waugh	Liberal
1885	Borough abolished; name transferred to county division	

=== MPs 1885–1918 ===
Cockermouth Division of Cumberland

Election	Member	Party
1885	Charles James Valentine	Conservative
1886	Sir Wilfrid Lawson	Liberal
1900	John Randles	Conservative
1906	Sir Wilfrid Lawson	Liberal
1906	Sir John Randles	Conservative
1910	Sir Wilfrid Lawson jnr.	Liberal
1916	Joseph Bliss	Liberal
1918	constituency abolished	

== Elections ==
=== Elections in the 1830s ===
General election 1830: Cockermouth
Party	Candidate	Votes	%	±%
Tory	Randolph Stewart	Unopposed		
Whig	Philip Pleydell-Bouverie	Unopposed		
Registered electors		c. 235		
Tory hold				
Whig gain from Tory				

General election 1831: Cockermouth
Party	Candidate	Votes	%	±%
Tory	John Lowther	Unopposed		
Tory	James Scarlett	Unopposed		
Registered electors		c. 235		
Tory hold				
Tory gain from Whig				

General election 1832: Cockermouth
Party	Candidate	Votes	%	±%
Whig	Fretchville Lawson Ballantine Dykes	187	40.2	New
Radical	Henry Aglionby Aglionby	153	32.9	New
Radical	Andrew Green	125	26.9	New
Majority		34	7.3	N/A
Turnout		255	83.6	N/A
Registered electors		305		
Whig gain from Tory		Swing	N/A	
Radical gain from Tory		Swing	N/A	

General election 1835: Cockermouth
Party	Candidate	Votes	%	±%
Radical	Henry Aglionby Aglionby	192	42.7	−17.1
Whig	Fretchville Lawson Ballantine Dykes	145	32.2	+12.1
Whig	Edward Horsman	113	25.1	+5.0
Majority		47	10.5	N/A
Turnout		258	78.7	−4.9
Registered electors		328		
Radical hold		Swing	−17.1	
Whig hold		Swing	+10.3	

Dykes resigned, causing a by-election.

By-election, 15 February 1836: Cockermouth
Party	Candidate	Votes	%	±%
Whig	Edward Horsman	Unopposed		
Whig hold				

General election 1837: Cockermouth
Party	Candidate	Votes	%	±%
Radical	Henry Aglionby Aglionby	169	42.0	−0.7
Whig	Edward Horsman	122	30.3	+5.2
Whig	Richard Benson	111	27.6	−4.6
Majority		47	11.7	+1.2
Turnout		229	77.1	−1.6
Registered electors		297		
Radical hold		Swing	−0.7	
Whig hold		Swing	+2.8	

=== Elections in the 1840s ===
Horsman was appointed a Lord Commissioner of the Treasury, requiring a by-election.

By-election, 1 June 1840: Cockermouth
Party	Candidate	Votes	%	±%
Whig	Edward Horsman	117	56.3	−1.6
Conservative	Henry Wyndham	91	43.8	New
Majority		26	12.5	N/A
Turnout		208	72.2	−4.9
Registered electors		288		
Whig hold		Swing	N/A	

General election 1841: Cockermouth
Party	Candidate	Votes	%	±%
Radical	Henry Aglionby Aglionby	129	36.2	−5.8
Whig	Edward Horsman	127	35.7	−22.2
Conservative	Henry Wyndham	100	28.1	N/A
Turnout		228	78.2	+1.1
Registered electors		293		
Majority		2	0.5	−11.2
Radical hold		Swing	'+8.5	
Majority		27	7.6	N/A
Whig hold		Swing	−8.5	

General election 1847: Cockermouth
Party	Candidate	Votes	%	±%
Whig	Edward Horsman	Unopposed		
Radical	Henry Aglionby Aglionby	Unopposed		
Registered electors		319		
Whig hold				
Radical hold				

=== Elections in the 1850s ===
General election 1852: Cockermouth
Party	Candidate	Votes	%	±%
Conservative	Henry Wyndham	160	34.7	New
Radical	Henry Aglionby Aglionby	154	33.4	N/A
Whig	Edward Horsman	147	31.9	N/A
Turnout		311 (est)	87.5 (est)	N/A
Registered electors		355		
Majority		13	2.8	N/A
Conservative gain from Whig				
Majority		7	1.5	N/A
Radical hold				

Aglionby's death caused a by-election.

By-election, 9 August 1854: Cockermouth
Party	Candidate	Votes	%	±%
Radical	John Steel	Unopposed		
Radical hold				

General election 1857: Cockermouth
Party	Candidate	Votes	%	±%
Conservative	Richard Bourke	Unopposed		
Radical	John Steel	Unopposed		
Registered electors		408		
Conservative hold				
Radical hold				

Bourke was appointed Chief Secretary to the Lord Lieutenant of Ireland, requiring a by-election.

By-election, 3 March 1858: Cockermouth
Party	Candidate	Votes	%	±%
Conservative	Richard Bourke	Unopposed		
Conservative hold				

General election 1859: Cockermouth
Party	Candidate	Votes	%	±%
Conservative	Richard Bourke	Unopposed		
Liberal	John Steel	Unopposed		
Registered electors		412		
Conservative hold				
Liberal hold				

=== Elections in the 1860s ===
General election 1865: Cockermouth
Party	Candidate	Votes	%	±%
Conservative	Richard Bourke	Unopposed		
Liberal	John Steel	Unopposed		
Registered electors		336		
Conservative hold				
Liberal hold				

Bourke was appointed Chief Secretary to the Lord Lieutenant of Ireland, requiring a by-election.

By-election, 11 Jul 1866: Cockermouth
Party	Candidate	Votes	%	±%
Conservative	Richard Bourke	Unopposed		
Conservative hold				

Steel's death caused a by-election.

By-election, 27 Apr 1868: Cockermouth
Party	Candidate	Votes	%	±%
Conservative	Andrew Green Thompson	171	54.3	N/A
Liberal	Isaac Fletcher	144	45.7	N/A
Majority		27	8.6	N/A
Turnout		315	93.8	N/A
Registered electors		336		
Conservative gain from Liberal				

Seat reduced to one member

General election 1868: Cockermouth
Party	Candidate	Votes	%	±%
Liberal	Isaac Fletcher	620	61.5	N/A
Conservative	Henry Lorton Bourke	388	38.5	N/A
Majority		232	23.0	N/A
Turnout		1,008	93.9	N/A
Registered electors		1,074		
Liberal hold				

=== Elections in the 1870s ===
General election 1874: Cockermouth
Party	Candidate	Votes	%	±%
Liberal	Isaac Fletcher	506	56.6	−4.9
Conservative	John Henry Fawcett	388	43.4	+4.9
Majority		118	13.2	−9.8
Turnout		894	83.0	−10.9
Registered electors		1,077		
Liberal hold		Swing	−4.9	

Fletcher's suicide caused a by-election.

By-election, 18 Apr 1879: Cockermouth
Party	Candidate	Votes	%	±%
Liberal	William Fletcher	557	60.3	+3.7
Conservative	David Rapley	366	39.7	−3.7
Majority		191	20.6	+7.4
Turnout		923	83.8	+0.8
Registered electors		1,102		
Liberal hold		Swing	+3.7	

=== Elections in the 1880s ===
General election 1880: Cockermouth
Party	Candidate	Votes	%	±%
Liberal	Edward Waugh	582	60.5	+3.9
Conservative	Robert Webster	380	39.5	−3.9
Majority		202	21.0	+7.8
Turnout		962	87.9	+4.9
Registered electors		1,094		
Liberal hold		Swing	+3.9	

General election 1885: Cockermouth
Party	Candidate	Votes	%	±%
Conservative	Charles James Valentine	3,845	50.1	+10.6
Liberal	Wilfrid Lawson	3,835	49.9	−10.6
Majority		10	0.2	N/A
Turnout		7,680	80.5	−7.4
Registered electors		9,538		
Conservative gain from Liberal		Swing	+10.6	

Wilfrid Lawson

General election 1886: Cockermouth
Party	Candidate	Votes	%	±%
Liberal	Wilfrid Lawson	4,130	56.9	+7.0
Liberal Unionist	Henry Frazer Curwen	3,126	43.1	−7.0
Majority		1,004	13.8	N/A
Turnout		7,256	76.1	−4.4
Registered electors		9,538		
Liberal gain from Conservative		Swing	+7.0	

=== Elections in the 1890s ===
General election 1892: Cockermouth
Party	Candidate	Votes	%	±%
Liberal	Wilfrid Lawson	4,599	54.6	−2.3
Conservative	John Scott Napier	3,829	45.4	+2.3
Majority		770	9.2	−4.6
Turnout		8,428	77.3	+1.2
Registered electors		10,906		
Liberal hold		Swing	−2.3	

General election 1895: Cockermouth
Party	Candidate	Votes	%	±%
Liberal	Wilfrid Lawson	4,259	51.5	−3.1
Conservative	Thomas Milvain	4,018	48.5	+3.1
Majority		241	3.0	−6.2
Turnout		8,277	80.8	+3.5
Registered electors		10,242		
Liberal hold		Swing	−3.1	

=== Elections in the 1900s ===
General election 1900: Cockermouth
Party	Candidate	Votes	%	±%
Conservative	John Randles	4,276	51.3	+2.8
Liberal	Wilfrid Lawson	4,067	48.7	−2.8
Majority		209	2.6	N/A
Turnout		8,343	76.6	−4.2
Registered electors		10,897		
Conservative gain from Liberal		Swing	+2.8	

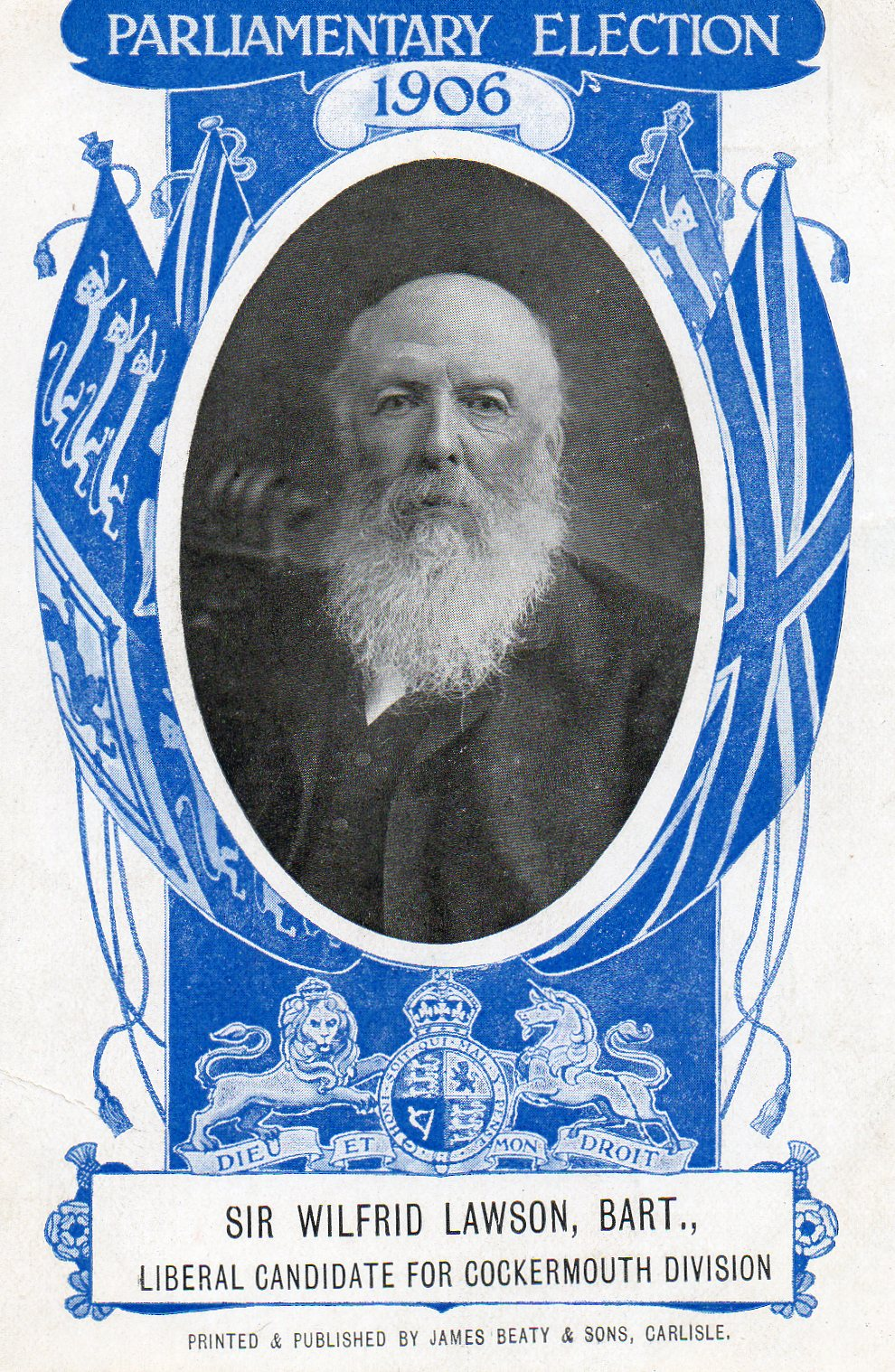

General election 1906: Cockermouth
Party	Candidate	Votes	%	±%
Liberal	Wilfrid Lawson	5,349	52.8	+4.1
Conservative	John Randles	4,786	47.2	−4.1
Majority		563	5.6	N/A
Turnout		10,135	86.6	+10.0
Registered electors		11,700		
Liberal gain from Conservative		Swing	+4.1	

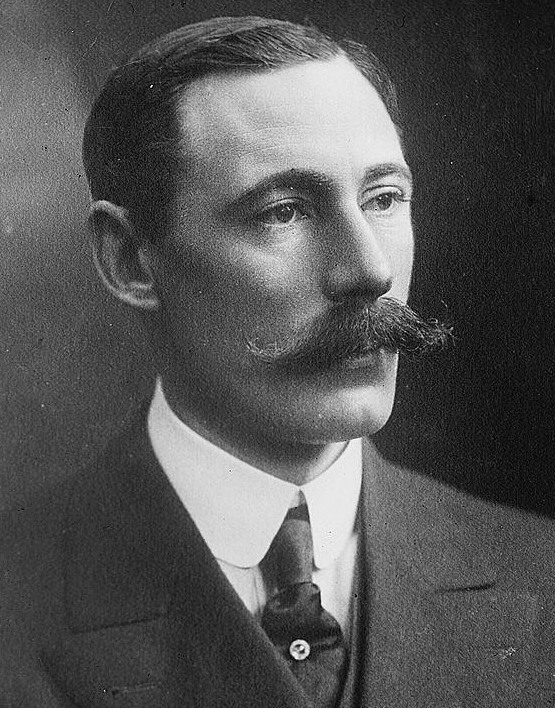
Frederick Guest

1906 Cockermouth by-election
Party	Candidate	Votes	%	±%
Conservative	John Randles	4,593	46.2	−1.0
Liberal	Frederick Guest	3,903	39.3	−13.5
Labour	Robert Smillie	1,436	14.5	New
Majority		690	6.9	N/A
Turnout		9,932	84.9	−1.7
Registered electors		11,700		
Conservative gain from Liberal		Swing	+6.2	

=== Elections in the 1910s ===
General election January 1910: Cockermouth
Party	Candidate	Votes	%	±%
Conservative	John Randles	4,579	45.2	−1.0
Liberal	Wilfrid Lawson	3,638	35.9	−3.4
Labour	James Percy Whitehead	1,909	18.9	+4.4
Majority		941	9.3	+2.4
Turnout		10,126	89.4	+4.5
Conservative hold		Swing	+1.2	

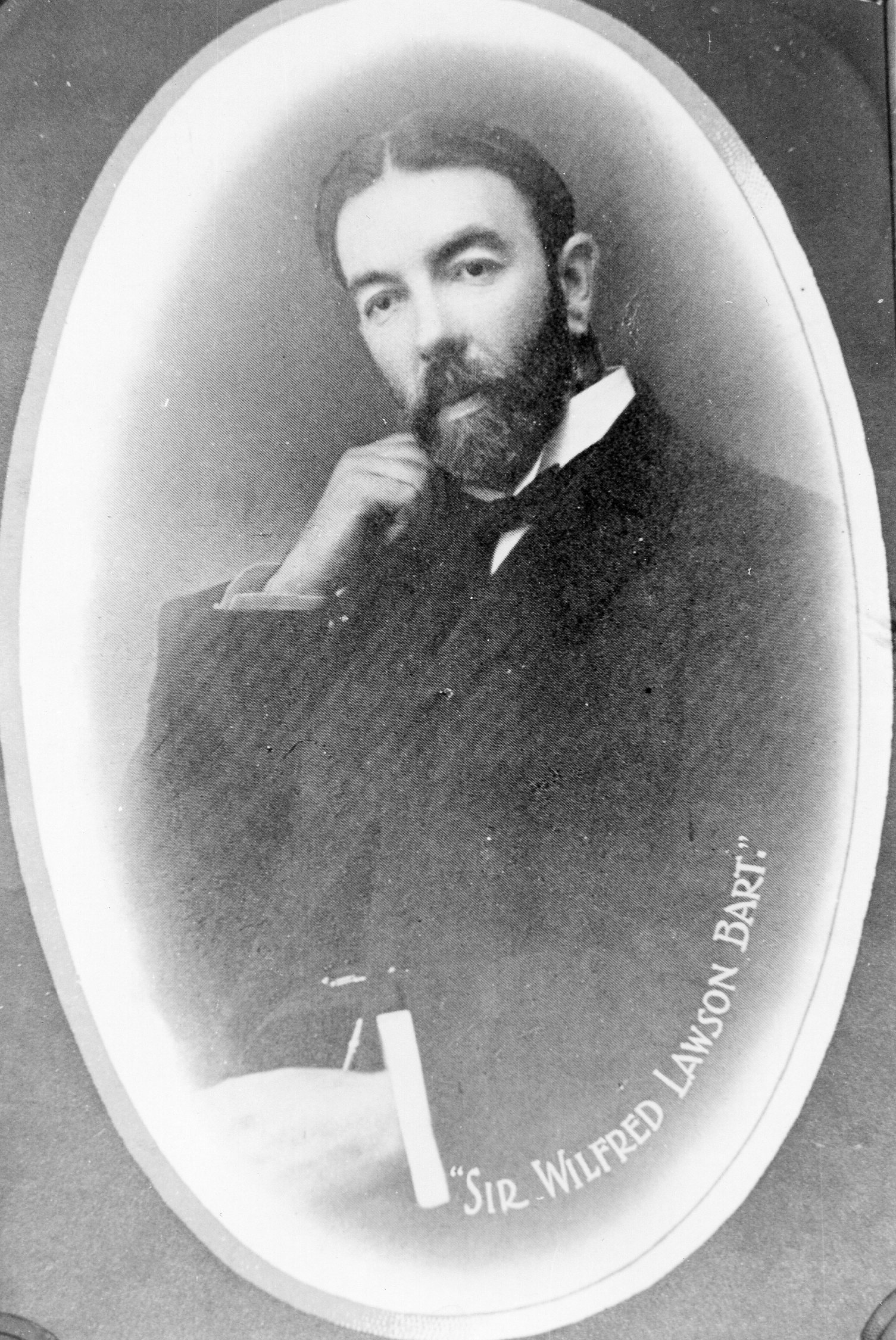
Lawson

General election December 1910: Cockermouth
Party	Candidate	Votes	%	±%
Liberal	Wilfrid Lawson	5,003	52.7	+16.8
Conservative	John Randles	4,492	47.3	+2.1
Majority		511	5.4	N/A
Turnout		9,495	83.8	−5.6
Liberal gain from Conservative		Swing	+7.4	

General Election 1914–15:

Another General Election was required to take place before the end of 1915. The political parties had been making preparations for an election to take place and by July 1914, the following candidates had been selected;

- Liberal: Wilfrid Lawson
- Unionist: Daniel Johnston Mason
- Labour:Thomas Cape

1916 Cockermouth by-election
Party	Candidate	Votes	%	±%
Liberal	Joseph Bliss	Unopposed	N/A	N/A
Liberal hold				
