= Henry Aglionby Aglionby =

British politician (1790–1854)

Henry Aglionby Aglionby (1790 – 31 July 1854) was a British barrister and Whig politician.

== Life and career ==
Born Henry Aglionby Bateman, he was the son of Rev. Samuel Bateman and Anne Aglionby. Anne became one of the co-heirs of the Aglionby family when her brother Christopher died without issue in 1785; Henry adopted the name of Aglionby in 1798 by the will of his aunt Julia Aglionby. Aglionby was educated at Sedbergh School, and thereafter at St John's College, Cambridge, where he graduated with a BA in 1813 and a MA in 1816. Called to the bar at Lincoln's Inn in June 1816, he became a special pleader on the Northern Circuit.

He was elected at the 1832 general election for the borough of Cockermouth in Cumberland, and held the seat until his death in 1854, aged 64. Like many others in western Cumberland, he was a strong supporter of the secret ballot, prompted part by the systematic bribery and intimidation which was used in 1832 to secure the election of the Tory MP Matthias Attwood in Whitehaven. In April 1833 Aglionby voted in favour of a motion proposed by City of London MP George Grote "That all elections of Members to serve in Parliament should in future be by ballot". The motion was defeated by 211 votes to 106.

== Personal life ==
In 1840, he inherited the rest of the Aglionby estates, including Nunnery, Cumberland, upon the death of his first cousin Francis Aglionby (formerly Yates). He married a Mrs. Sadd on 2 March 1852, at his manor of Caterham, Surrey; they had no children. By entail, the Aglionby estates passed to Charles Yates, of Virginia, the nephew of Francis Aglionby.

Parliament of the United Kingdom
Preceded by John Henry Lowther; Sir James Scarlett	Member of Parliament for Cockermouth; 1832 – 1854; With: Fretchville Dykes 1832–36; Edward Horsman 1836–52; Henry Wyndham 1852–54	Succeeded by John Steel; Henry Wyndham
