= William Lowther, 2nd Earl of Lonsdale =

British Tory politician (1787-1872)

The Right Honourable The Earl of Lonsdale FRS PC
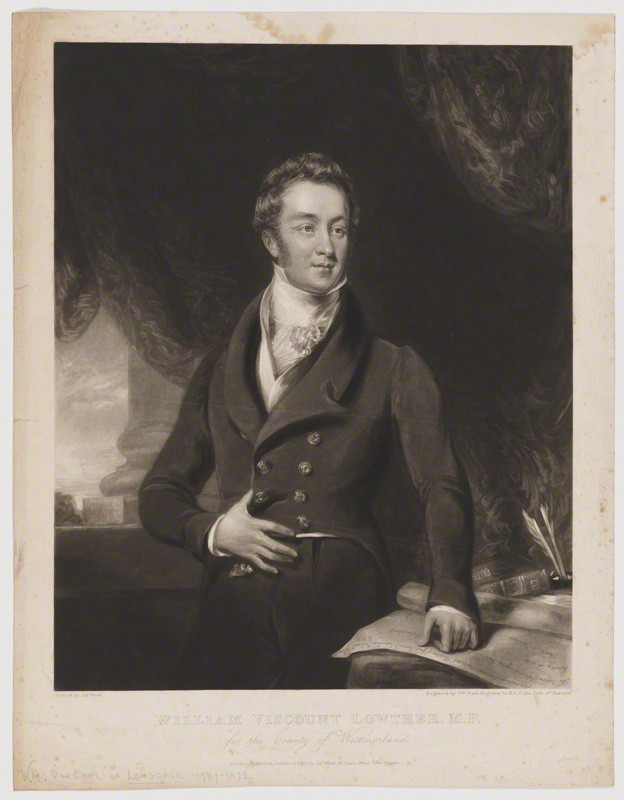

Postmaster General
- In office 9 September 1841 – 30 December 1845
- Monarch: Victoria
- Prime Minister: Sir Robert Peel, Bt
- Preceded by: The Earl of Lichfield
- Succeeded by: The Earl of St Germans

Lord President of the Council
- In office 27 February 1852 – 17 December 1852
- Monarch: Victoria
- Prime Minister: The Earl of Derby
- Preceded by: The Marquess of Lansdowne
- Succeeded by: The Earl Granville

Personal details
- Born: 21 July 1787
- Died: 4 March 1872 (aged 84)
- Party: Tory

William Lowther, 2nd Earl of Lonsdale, PC, FRS (21 July 1787 – 4 March 1872), styled Viscount Lowther between 1807 and 1844, was a British Tory politician.

== Background ==
Lonsdale was the eldest son of William Lowther, 1st Earl of Lonsdale, and Lady Augusta, daughter of John Fane, 9th Earl of Westmorland. Henry Lowther was his younger brother. He was educated at Harrow and Trinity College, Cambridge.

== Political career ==
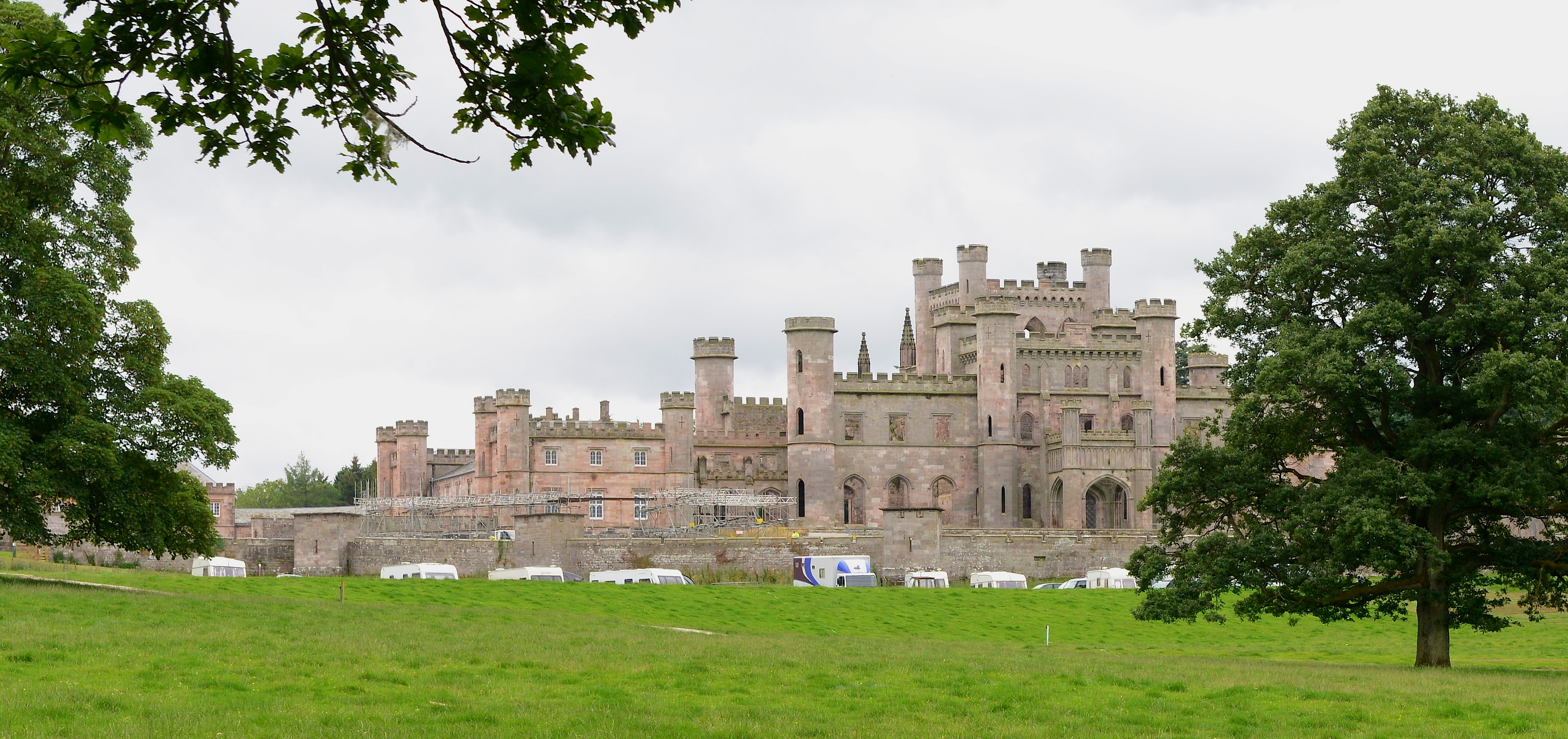
Lowther Castle, seat of the Earls of Lonsdale

Lonsdale was returned to parliament for Cockermouth in 1808, a seat he held until 1813, and later represented Westmorland between 1813 and 1831 and 1832 and 1841, Dunwich in 1832 and West Cumberland between 1832 and 1833. He was sworn of the Privy Council in 1818 and served under the Duke of Wellington as First Commissioner of Woods and Forests between 1828 and 1830 and under Sir Robert Peel as Treasurer of the Navy and Vice-President of the Board of Trade between 1834 and 1835.

In 1841 he was summoned to the House of Lords through a writ of acceleration in his father's junior title of Baron Lowther and held office under Peel as Postmaster General between 1841 and 1845. In 1844 he succeeded his father in the earldom of Lonsdale. He held his last ministerial office as Lord President of the Council, with a seat in the cabinet, in 1852, in the Earl of Derby's first administration.

Lonsdale was elected a Fellow of the Royal Society on 5 July 1810. He was also Lord Lieutenant of Cumberland and Westmorland between 1844 and 1868.

== Personal life ==
Lord Lonsdale never married, but acknowledged three illegitimate children born to opera singers or dancers; he left them substantial sums in his will. His daughter with Caroline Saintfal, Marie Caroline, was born in Paris in 1818. Another daughter born the same year, Frances ("Fanny") Lowther (1818–1890), was registered as the daughter of "Narcisse Chassepomp", in fact Pierre-Narcisse Chaspoux, formerly a dancer at the Paris Opera and then in London, who in 1821 gave birth to the artist Charles Meryon. Frances (Fanny) married Henry Broadwood MP (1793–1878, of the piano-making family), and was the mother of Brig-Gen. Arthur Broadwood (1848–1928). With Emilia Cresotti, an Italian opera singer, he fathered Francis William Lowther (1841–1908), who was the father of Claude Lowther MP and Toupie Lowther.

He died in his London house at 15 Carlton House Terrace on 4 March 1872, aged 84, and was succeeded in the earldom and to Lowther Castle by his nephew, Henry. On the day he died he waited in his carriage outside a London auction house, while an agent bid on his behalf on some lots of porcelain. Of an estate valued at £700,000 (without the entailed land), Francis William and Fanny were bequeathed £125,000 each, and Francis's son £25,000.

A marble bust of him was sculpted by Edward Bowring Stephens, now in the National Trust collection at Hughenden Manor, Buckinghamshire.

== Collecting ==
From 1842 until his death he gathered a collection of ancient works of art at his country seat, Lowther Castle, composed of more than 100 pieces of Egyptian, Etruscan, Greek, and mostly Roman sculpture, during the Victorian era.

Parliament of the United Kingdom
Preceded by Sir James Graham, Bt; John Osborn	Member of Parliament for Cockermouth; 1808–1813; With: Sir James Graham, Bt 1808–1812; Sir John Lowther, Bt 1812; Augustus Foster 1812–1813	Succeeded by Augustus Foster; Thomas Wallace
Preceded by The Lord Muncaster; Hon. Henry Lowther	Member of Parliament for Westmorland; 1813–1831; With: Hon. Henry Lowther	Succeeded by Hon. Henry Lowther; Alexander Nowell
Preceded by Frederick Barne; Earl of Brecknock	Member of Parliament for Dunwich; 1832; With: Frederick Barne	Constituency abolished
New constituency	Member of Parliament for West Cumberland; 1832–1833; With: Edward Stanley	Succeeded by Samuel Irton; Edward Stanley
Preceded by Hon. Henry Lowther; Alexander Nowell	Member of Parliament for Westmorland; 1832–1841; With: Hon. Henry Lowther	Succeeded by Hon. Henry Lowther; William Thompson
Political offices
Preceded by Charles Arbuthnot	First Commissioner of Woods and Forests; 1828–1830	Succeeded by Hon. George Agar-Ellis
Preceded by Charles Poulett Thomson	Treasurer of the Navy; 1834–1835	Succeeded by Sir Henry Parnell, Bt
Preceded by Charles Poulett Thomson	Vice-President of the Board of Trade; 1834–1835	Succeeded by Henry Labouchere
Preceded by The Earl of Lichfield	Postmaster General; 1841–1845	Succeeded by The Earl of St Germans
Preceded by The Marquess of Lansdowne	Lord President of the Council; 1852	Succeeded by The Earl Granville
Honorary titles
Preceded by The Earl of Lonsdale	Lord Lieutenant of Cumberland and Westmorland; 1844–1868	Succeeded by Henry Lowther
Peerage of the United Kingdom
Preceded by William Lowther	Earl of Lonsdale; 1844–1872	Succeeded by Henry Lowther
Peerage of Great Britain
Preceded by William Lowther	Baron Lowther (writ of acceleration); 1841–1872	Succeeded by Henry Lowther
