= Henry Lowther, 3rd Earl of Lonsdale =

British politician (1818–1876)

The Right Honourable The Earl of Lonsdale
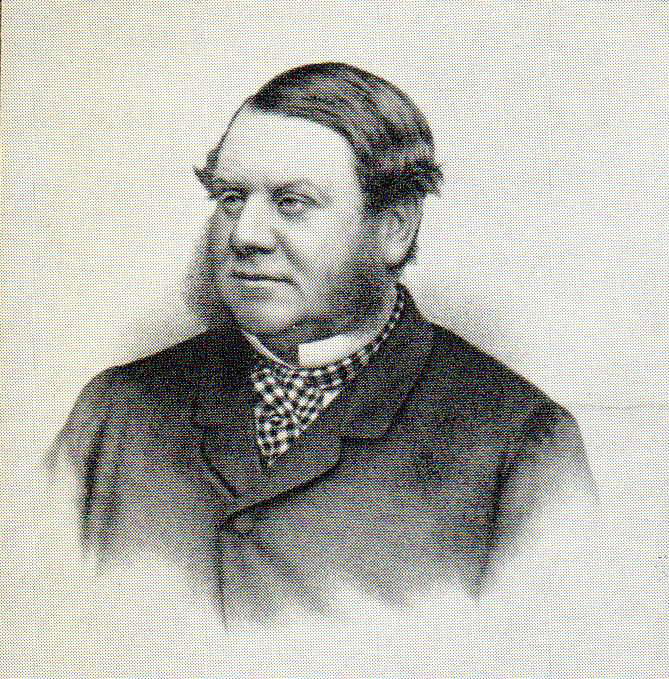

Lord Lieutenant of Cumberland
- In office 1868–1876
- Preceded by: The Earl of Lonsdale
- Succeeded by: The Lord Muncaster

Lord Lieutenant of Westmorland
- In office 1868–1876
- Preceded by: The Earl of Lonsdale
- Succeeded by: Sir Richard Musgrave, Bt

Member of Parliament for West Cumberland
- In office 1847–1872
- Preceded by: Edward Stanley; Samuel Irton
- Succeeded by: Percy Scawen Wyndham; The Lord Muncaster

Personal details
- Born: Henry Lowther; 27 March 1818
- Died: 15 August 1876 (aged 58)
- Party: Conservative
- Spouse: Emily Susan Caulfeild (m. 1852)
- Relations: 1st Earl of Lonsdale (grandfather); 5th Earl of Harborough (grandfather)
- Children: Lady Sibyl Lowther; 4th Earl of Lonsdale; 5th Earl of Lonsdale; Hon Charles Lowther; Lady Verena Lowther; 6th Earl of Lonsdale
- Parent(s): Henry Cecil Lowther; Lady Lucy Sherard
- Education: Westminster School
- Alma mater: Trinity College, Cambridge

Henry Lowther, 3rd Earl of Lonsdale (27 March 1818 – 15 August 1876) was a British nobleman and Conservative politician.

== Early life ==
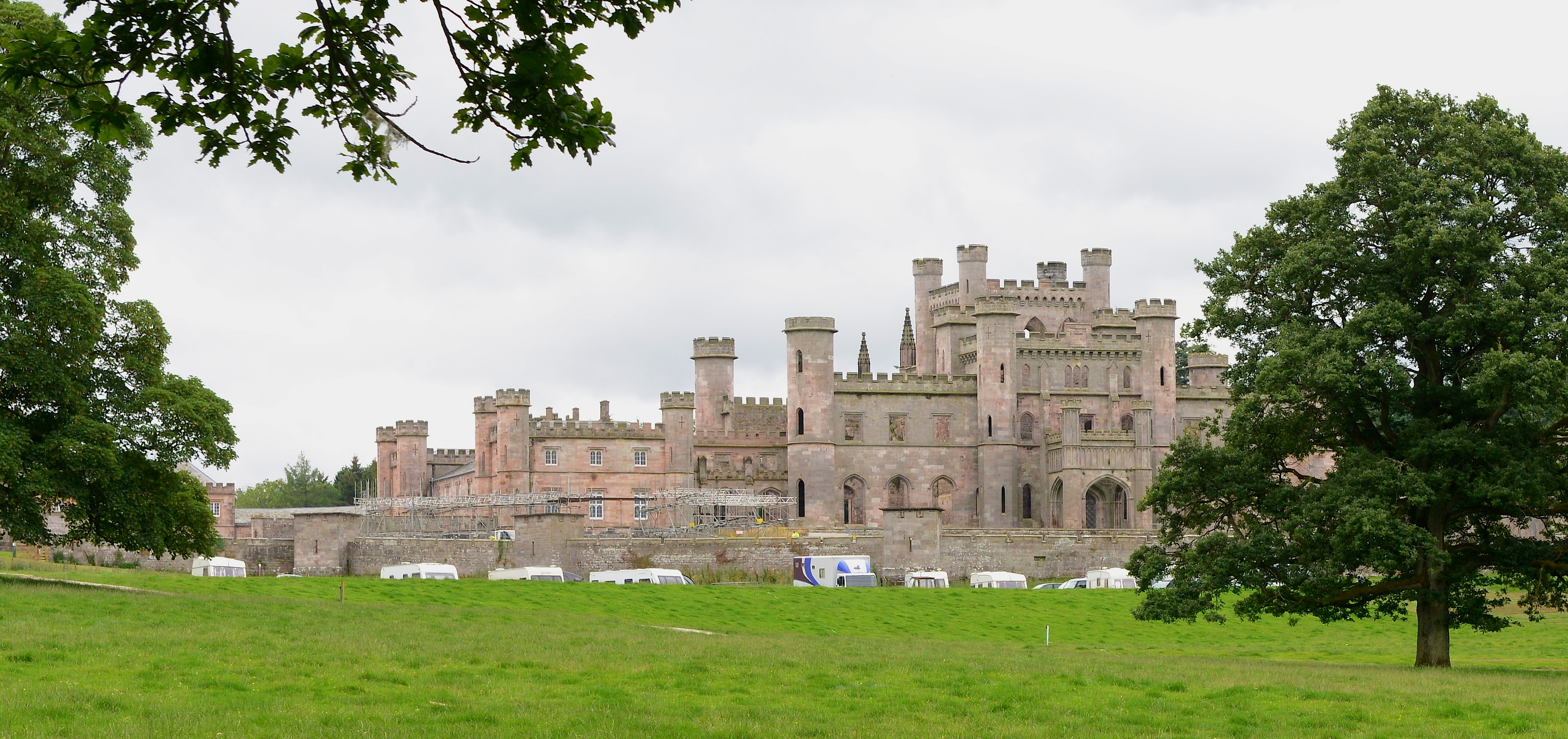
Lowther Castle – seat of the Earls of Lonsdale

Lowther was born on 27 March 1818. He was the eldest son of Hon. Henry Cecil Lowther and Lady Lucy Sherard. His paternal grandfather was William Lowther, 1st Earl of Lonsdale and his maternal grandfather was Philip Sherard, 5th Earl of Harborough.

In 1868, he succeeded his uncle William in his Lord Lieutenancies, and in 1872 as Earl of Lonsdale.

== Career ==
He was educated at Westminster School and Trinity College, Cambridge and in 1841 he joined the 1st Life Guards.

From 1847 until his elevation to the peerage and ascension to the House of Lords in 1872, Lowther served as a Member of Parliament for West Cumberland. He succeeded Edward Stanley and Samuel Irton. While in Parliament, he served alongside Edward Stanley (from 1847 to 1852), Samuel Irton (from 1852 to 1857), Sir Henry Wyndham (from 1857 to 1860), and Percy Scawen Wyndham (from 1860 to 1872). Lord Lonsdale was succeeded by Percy Wyndham and The Lord Muncaster.

In 1870, he became Master of the Cottesmore Hunt.

== Personal life ==
On 31 July 1852, he married Emily Susan Caulfeild, the daughter of St George Caulfeild of Donamon Castle of Roscommon, Ireland. They had six children:

- Lady Sibyl Emily Lowther (d. 11 June 1932), who married Major General George Williams Knox CB on 30 April 1886
- St George Henry Lowther, 4th Earl of Lonsdale (1855–1882)
- Hugh Cecil Lowther, 5th Earl of Lonsdale (1857–1944)
- Hon Charles Edwin Lowther (11 July 1859 – 2 April 1888), who married Kate Fink on 12 June 1878
- Lady Verena Maud Lowther (6 April 1865 – 25 December 1938), who married Victor Spencer, 1st Viscount Churchill on 1 January 1887, divorced 1927
- Lancelot Edward Lowther, 6th Earl of Lonsdale (1867–1953)

Lord Lonsdale died after an attack of pneumonia on 15 August 1876 at the age of 58 and was succeeded in his titles by his eldest son, St George Henry Lowther, who became the 4th Earl of Lonsdale at age 23.

Parliament of the United Kingdom
| Preceded by Edward Stanley; Samuel Irton | Member of Parliament for West Cumberland; 1847 – 1872; With: Edward Stanley 1847–1852; Samuel Irton 1852–1857; Sir Henry Wyndham 1857–1860; Percy Scawen Wyndham 1860–1872 | Succeeded by Percy Scawen Wyndham; The Lord Muncaster |
Honorary titles
| Preceded by The Earl of Lonsdale | Lord Lieutenant of Cumberland; 1868–1876 | Succeeded by The Lord Muncaster |
| Preceded by The Earl of Lonsdale | Lord Lieutenant of Westmorland; 1868–1876 | Succeeded by Sir Richard Musgrave, Bt |
Peerage of the United Kingdom
| Preceded by William Lowther | Earl of Lonsdale; 1872–1876 | Succeeded by St George Lowther |
