= Pennington (surname) =

Pennington is a surname indicating a family origin in Pennington, Cumbria. Other branches include members from an area of Surrey, London, Yorkshire, Hampshire and North America. This surname was originally spelled Pennigetun, though the spelling eventually evolved to Pennington.

== History ==
First appearing in the Domesday Book which is England's earliest public record containing a unique survey of the value and ownership of lands and resources in late 11th century England. Pennington is mentioned in the Domesday Book as one of the townships forming the Manor of Hougun which was held by Tostig Godwinson, Earl of North Cumbria. In the book, the surname's first recorded occurrence was spelled Pennigetun and the first place named Pennigetun is Pennington, Cumbria near Lancaster and it is said to have been named after the aristocratic Pennington Family. The manor is exactly the same size as the parish which formerly belonged to the Cistercian Abbey of Furness, and includes 4,160 acres or six and one-half square miles. The parish was the smallest in Lancashire. The village was composed of 50 houses and 284 people in the mid-nineteenth century, and is about the same size today. The name likely was inspired from the Pennines chain of mountains that run through Northern England and Cumbria. When put together, the British word "pennig" (little hill) and the Saxon word "ton" (town) makes Pennigetun/Pennington. Nonetheless, the record was compiled in 1086–1087, a mere twenty years after the Norman Conquest, at the order of William the Conqueror. Surnames did not exist before the Norman Conquest (1066 AD).

Famously, there existed the Pennington House. The Pennington family traces its lineage back to Gamel de Penitone, a prominent figure before and during the Norman Conquest of 1066, according to "The English Baronetage" published in 1741. By 1250 the Pennington names were all in Norman form. In general, Old English (Saxon) and Cymric (Welsh or British) names were a minority in the population. It may well be that other inhabitants of the village of Pennington took the town name as a surname during the 1100s and 1200s, yet since it was a very tiny village, it is very likely all were closely related anyway. Gamel de Penitone can with very great confidence be called an ancestor of all the Penningtons today. Overall, this account suggests the family's importance in Cumberland even before the Norman Conquest. Early records of the Pennington family tree can be found in a book for Sir Josslyn Pennington, 5th Baron Muncaster of Muncaster and ninth baronet. Additionally, they were connected by marriage to the Percy family and bore the Percy arms with slight variation. Nevertheless, historical evidence points to Muncaster as the ancestral home of the Pennington Family since at least 1208 when lands were granted to Alan de Penitone, though some records hint at an even earlier connection dating back to 1026. Fifty years later a castle was built by Gamel de Mulcastre. Muncaster Castle was home to the Pennington family for 800 years. The castle evolved from the Pele Tower, built to repel marauding Scots. The estate was originally 23,000 acres; today it is 1,800 acres. It is recorded in the National Heritage List for England as a designated Grade I listed building.

In 1917, with the death of the fifth and last Lord Muncaster without heirs, Sir Josslyn Pennington, 5th Baron Muncaster, the estate passed to Sir John Ramsden, a cousin on his mother's side. This ended the Pennington Baronetcy and created the Pennington-Ramsden Baronetcy. As a condition of inheritance, Sir John's second son assumed the Pennington name. The Ramsdens sold the Ramsden Estate (Huddersfield) in 1920. The Ramsdens are distinguished in their own right and also played a significant role in Yorkshire's history and brought with them a legacy of estate management and horticultural expertise. Today, the castle is owned by Iona Frost Pennington, the great-granddaughter of Sir John Ramsden, continuing the legacy of the Pennington family at Muncaster Castle.

Today, the National Genealogical Society and Earlham College holds the family's digital files.

== Sport ==
- Alan Pennington (1916–1961), British sprinter
- Alfred Pennington (born 1975), English footballer
- Art Pennington (1923–2017), American baseball player
- Brad Pennington (born 1969), American baseball player
- Chad Pennington (born 1976), American footballer
- Cliff Pennington (baseball) (born 1984), Major League Baseball infielder
- Cliff Pennington (ice hockey) (1940–2020), Canadian ice hockey forward
- Cole Pennington, American college football player, son of Chad Pennington
- George Pennington (cricketer) (active 1927), English sportsman
- Hal Pennington (active 1934–1988), American athletics coach
- Harry Pennington (wrestler) (1902–1995), British wrestler
- Harry Pennington (cricketer) (1880–1961), English cricketer
- Harry Pennington (footballer) (1873-?), English footballer
- Jack Pennington (born 1953), American racing car driver
- Jesse Pennington (1883–1970), English footballer
- Jimmy Pennington (born 1939), English footballer
- Joan Pennington (born 1960), American swimmer
- John Pennington (cricketer) (1881–1942), English cricketer
- Kewpie Pennington (1896–1953), American baseball player
- Matthew Pennington (born 1994), English footballer
- Parker Pennington (born 1984), American figure skater
- Raquel Pennington (born 1988), American martial artist
- Rowland Pennington (1870–1929), English footballer
- Terrance Pennington (born 1983), American footballer
- Tom Pennington (1939–2013), American footballer

== Politics ==
- A. A. Pennington (1825–1885), US politician
- Alexander C. M. Pennington (politician) (1810–1867), New Jersey politician, father of the general
- Alexander C. M. Pennington (general) (1838–1917), U.S. army officer, son of the politician
- Andrew Pennington (1960/61–2000), British politician
- Dennis Pennington (1776–1854), American politician
- Fannie Pennington (1914–2013), American activist
- Frederick Pennington (1819–1914), English merchant and politician
- James W.C. Pennington (1809–1870), African-American religious leader and activist
- John Kenneth Pennington (1927–2011), Priest and politician
- John L. Pennington (1829–1900), fifth governor of Dakota Territory
- John Pennington (politician) (1870–1945), Australian politician
- John Pennington, 1st Baron Muncaster (1740–1813), British peer
- Luther Pennington (1922–2014), American United Methodist pastor and politician
- William George Pennington (fl. 1858–1868), Australian politician
- William Pennington (1796–1862), US politician
- William Sanford Pennington (1757–1826), American politician

== Science, engineering, medicine, etc ==
- Barry Pennington (1923–1968), William Barry Pennington, British mathematician
- Donald Pennington, British psychologist and Vice-chancellor
- E. J. Pennington (1858–1911), American inventor and entrepreneur
- Havoc Pennington (born c1976), Robert Sanford Havoc Pennington, US computer engineer
- Hugh Pennington (born 1938), Thomas Hugh Pennington, British bacteriologist and academic
- Isaac Pennington (1745–1817), English physician
- Josias Pennington, Architect of Baldwin & Pennington
- Mark Pennington, British political scientist
- Mary Engle Pennington (1872–1952), American bacteriological chemist and refrigeration engineer
- Winifred Pennington (1915–2007), British biologist

== Arts and entertainment ==
- Ann Pennington (actress) (1893–1971), American actress
- Ann Pennington (model) (born 1950)
- Barbara Pennington (born 1954), American singer
- Basil Pennington (1931–2005), American Catholic priest, religious leader and author
- Bruce Pennington (born 1944), British painter and illustrator
- C. M. Pennington-Richards (1911–2005), British film director
- J.P. Pennington (born 1949), American musician
- James Pennington (born 1965), American musician, also known as Suburban Knight
- Janice Pennington (born 1942), American model
- Joe Pennington (1928–2020), American guitarist, also known as "Joe Penny"
- Jon Penington (1922–1997), British screenwriter
- Marla Pennington (born 1954), American actress
- Michael Pennington (1943–2026), English actor, director and writer
- Michael Joseph Pennington (born 1970), English actor, also known as Johnny Vegas
- Pennington's Seventeenth Summer, or Pennington's Last Term, a novel by K. M. Peyton
- Ray Pennington, (1933–2020), American singer
- Ty Pennington (born 1964), American TV host
- Zac Pennington (fl. 2002–2013), American musician of the Parenthetical Girls
- Jim Pennington (born 1972), American artist
- William Henry Pennington (1833–1923), English soldier and actor

== Miscellaneous ==
- Alexander Cummings McWhorter Pennington Jr. (1838–1917), American soldier
- Dom Basil Pennington (1931–2005), Cistercian monk
- Bill Pennington (1956), American journalist
- Brooks Pennington Jr. (1925–1996), American businessman
- Dennis Pennington (1776–1854), farmer and a stonemason
- Irene Wells Pennington (1898–2003), American entrepreneur
- Sir John Penington (1584–1646), English sailor
- Sir Joseph Pennington, 2nd Baronet (1677–1744)
- Josslyn Francis Pennington, 5th Baron Muncaster (1834–1917)
- Julie Pennington-Russell (born 1960), American Baptist minister
- Larcena Pennington Page (1837–1913), American pioneer
- Lowther Pennington, 2nd Baron Muncaster (1745–1818)
- Richard Pennington (1947–2017), American police officer
- Robert B. Pennington, American Marine
- Sarah, Lady Pennington (d 1783), an English noblewoman and author
- William Pennington (businessman) (1923–2011), American gambler

== See also ==
- Penington (surname)
- Pennington (disambiguation)
