= John Ramsden =

John Ramsden may refer to:

- John Ramsden (died 1646) (1594–1646), English politician
- John Ramsden (died 1665), English politician
- John Ramsden (died 1718), MP for Hull 1685–1695
- Sir John Ramsden, 1st Baronet (1648–1690), first of the Ramsden baronets
- Sir John Ramsden, 3rd Baronet (1699–1769), MP for Appleby
- Sir John Ramsden, 4th Baronet (1755–1839), MP for Grampound
- John Charles Ramsden (1788–1836), son of the 4th Baronet, Whig politician in Yorkshire, MP between 1812 and 1836
- John William Ramsden (1831–1914), MP for Taunton, Hythe, West Riding of Yorkshire, and Monmouth; Under-Secretary of State for War
- Sir John Frecheville Ramsden, 6th Baronet (1877–1958) of the Ramsden baronets
- Sir John Ramsden, 9th Baronet (born 1950), on List of ambassadors of the United Kingdom to Croatia
- John Ramsden (cricketer) (1878–1973), New Zealand cricketer
- John Ramsden (historian) (1947–2009), professor of history at Queen Mary, University of London
- John Carman Ramsden, Canadian politician
