= Ramsden (surname) =

Ramsden is a surname, and may refer to:

- Anne Ramsden, Canadian artist
- Barney Ramsden (1917–1990), English footballer
- Charlie Ramsden (1904–1975), English footballer
- Sir Dave Ramsden (born 1964), British civil servant
- Denise Ramsden (athlete), English Olympian sprint athlete of the 1960s and 1970s
- Ernest Ramsden, English footballer
- Eugene Ramsden, 1st Baron Ramsden (1883–1955), English politician
- Gary Ramsden (born 1983), English cricketer
- George Taylor Ramsden (1879–1936), British politician
- Harry Ramsden (1888–1963), English businessman, founder of restaurant chain Harry Ramsden's
- Horace Edward Ramsden (1878–1948), South African Victoria Cross recipient
- J. George Ramsden (1867–1946), Canadian politician
- James Ramsden (disambiguation), multiple people
- Jesse Ramsden (1735–1800), English astronomical and scientific instrument maker
- John Ramsden (disambiguation), multiple people
- Mark Ramsden (born 1956), British musician
- Marvin Lee Ramsden (1919–1942), US Medal of Honor recipient
- Mary Ramsden (born 1984), British painter
- Michael Ramsden (1947–2016), Australian painter
- Omar Ramsden (1873–1939), English silversmith
- Peter Ramsden (rugby league) (1934–2002), English rugby league footballer
- Peter Ramsden (bishop) (born 1951), Anglican bishop in Papua New Guinea
- Simon Ramsden (born 1981), English footballer
- Walter Ramsden (1868–1947), English biochemist and physiologist
- William Havelock Ramsden (1888–1969), British Army officer

== See also ==
- Ramsden (disambiguation)
- Ramsden Baronets
- Edward Ramsden Hall
- Henry Ramsden Bramley
