= Sarah, Lady Pennington =

English author

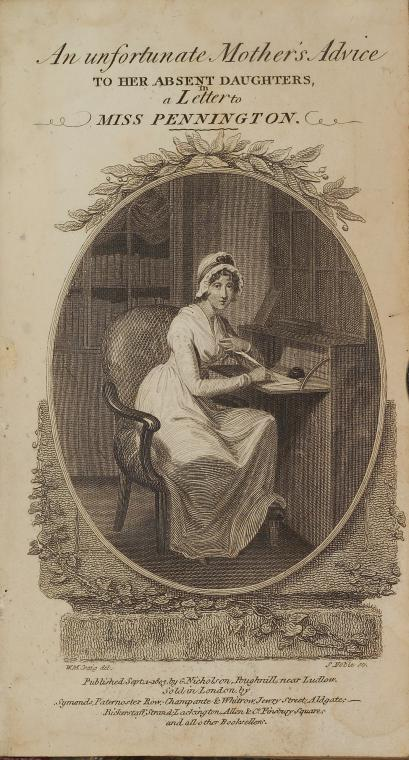
- Born: 1720
- Died: 1783
- Spouse(s): Sir Joseph Pennington, 4th Bt.
- Children: 6, including John and Lowther

Sarah, Lady Pennington, née Moore (c.1720, Bath, Somerset – August 1783, Fulmer), was an Englishwoman who wrote a widely read and much reprinted book on conduct for young women.

== Biography ==
Born Sarah Moore, she was married to Sir Joseph Pennington, 4th Baronet, of Warter Hall in Yorkshire, who was a commissioner of customs. Their marriage deteriorated, and after a dozen years their private disagreements turned into a public scandal when the couple separated. At this period divorce was very difficult to obtain in England, requiring a costly private act of Parliament, and even mutually agreed separations were highly stigmatized. Lady Pennington moved to Bath, leaving her children with their father, who appears to have entirely cut her off from any further contact with them. Although she had received no formal education, she wrote a popular manual of conduct for young women, An Unfortunate Mother's Advice to Her Absent Daughters; in a Letter to Miss Pennington (1761). Its first sentence offers her rationale for writing the book:

"My Dear Jenny: Was there any Probability that a Letter from me would be permitted to reach your Hand alone, I should not have chosen this least eligible Method of writing to you."

Most unusually, Lady Pennington combined the traditional form of the social conduct manual with a defense of her decision to leave her marriage. While it is clear that she considered her husband greatly to blame, she took responsibility for her own actions and argued that in such situations a woman's right to follow her conscience is more important than blind obedience to marriage vows. She succeeded in escaping the censure usually leveled at women in broken marriages and became instead an object of public sympathy; for example, an obituary in the Gentleman's Magazine referred to her "severe and uncommon afflictions". Her book was frequently reprinted, going through three editions in the first year alone, and it continued to appear in various editions and in anthologies well into the 19th century.

Lady Pennington published two other pieces of writing, Letters on Different Subjects (1766) and The Child's Conductor (1777).
