= William Ramsden =

William Ramsden may refer to:

- William Ramsden (British Army officer) (1888–1969), British Army commander during World War II
- William Ramsden (died 1623), Lord of the Manor of Huddersfield in Yorkshire, England
- Sir William Ramsden, 2nd Baronet (1672–1736)
- Sir John William Ramsden, 5th Baronet (1831–1914), British Liberal Party politician
- Sir William Pennington-Ramsden, 7th Baronet (1904–1986)
