= John Rhind =

John Rhind may refer to:

- John Rhind (architect) (1836–1889), Scottish architect
- John Rhind (sculptor) (1828–1892), Scottish sculptor
- J. Massey Rhind (1860–1936), Scottish-American sculptor, son of John Rhind (sculptor)
- John Stevenson Rhind (1859–1937), Scottish sculptor, nephew of John Rhind (sculptor)
