= Austin baronets =

Baronetcy in the Baronetage of the United Kingdom

- Escutcheon of the Austin baronets of Red Hill, Yorkshire
- Creation date: 1894
- Status: extant
- Motto: Trust in God and He will give strength

The Austin Baronetcy, of Red Hill in the parish of Castleford in the West Riding of the County of York, is a title in the Baronetage of the United Kingdom. It was created on 16 July 1894 for John Austin, Liberal member of parliament for Osgoldcross.

== Austin baronets of Red Hill, Yorkshire (1894) ==
- Sir John Austin, 1st Baronet (1824–1906)
- Sir William Michael Byron Austin, 2nd Baronet (1871–1940)
- Sir John Byron Fraser Austin, 3rd Baronet (1897–1981)
- Sir William Ronald Austin, 4th Baronet (1900–1989)
- Sir Michael Trescawen Austin, 5th Baronet (1927–1995)
- Sir Anthony Leonard Austin, 6th Baronet (1930–2017)
- Sir Peter John Austin, 7th Baronet (born 1958)

The heir presumptive is the present holder's brother Nicholas Michael James Austin (born 1960).

== Notes ==
Baronetage of the United Kingdom
| Preceded by Pearson baronets | Austin baronets of Red Hill; 16 July 1894 | Succeeded by Reckitt baronets |
