= James Pennington (disambiguation) =

James Pennington (born 1965) is a DJ and producer.

James Pennington may also refer to:

- James W. C. Pennington (c. 1807–1870), American abolitionist
- Jimmy Pennington (born 1939), English footballer
