= Sir John Ramsden, 4th Baronet =

English landowner (1755–1839)

Sir John Ramsden, Bt

Member of Parliament for Grampound
- In office 1780–1784 Serving with Thomas Lucas
- Preceded by: Hon. Sir Joseph Yorke; Richard Neville
- Succeeded by: Hon. John Somers Cocks; Francis Baring

Personal details
- Born: 1755
- Died: 15 July 1839 (aged 83–84) Piccadilly, London
- Spouse: Hon. Louisa Susan Ingram-Shepherd (m. 1787)
- Children: 9
- Parent(s): Sir John Ramsden, 3rd Baronet; Margaret Norton Bright
- Education: University College, Oxford

Sir John Ramsden, 4th Baronet (1755 – 15 July 1839) was an English landowner and Member of Parliament.

== Early life ==
He was born in 1755 and was the only son of Margaret (née Norton) Bright and Sir John Ramsden, 3rd Baronet of Byram, near Pontefract, Yorkshire, whom he succeeded in 1769, inheriting the Manor of Huddersfield and the associated Ramsden Estate. His mother, the daughter of William Norton, Esq. of Sawley, was the widow of Thomas Liddell Bright.

He was educated at University College, Oxford, 1774.

== Career ==
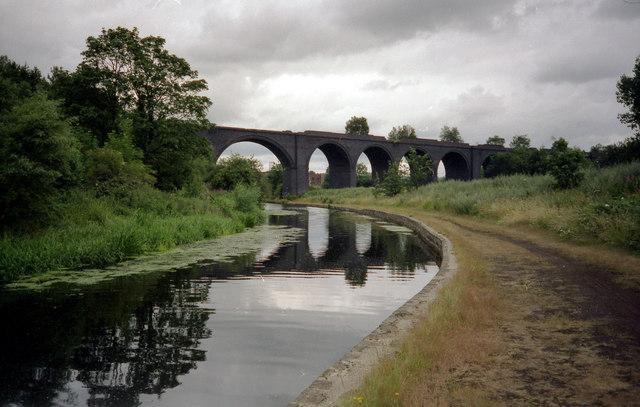
Huddersfield Broad Canal

An Act of Parliament (14 Geo. 3. c. 13) obtained on 9 March 1774, enabled "Sir John Ramsden, Baronet, to make and maintain a navigable Canal from the River Calder, between a Bridge called Cooper's Bridge, and the Mouth of the River Colne to the King's Mill, near the town of Huddersfleld, in the West Riding of the county of York". Completed in 1776 and originally named Sir John Ramsden's Canal, it is now known as the Huddersfield Broad Canal.

He was elected Member of Parliament (MP) for Grampound under the patronage of Lord Rockingham in 1780, retiring from politics in 1784. He was made High Sheriff of Yorkshire for 1797–98.

== Personal life ==
On 7 July 1787, He married the Hon. Louisa Susan Ingram-Shepherd, daughter and coheiress of Charles Ingram, 9th Viscount of Irvine. Louisa's eldest sister, Isabella, married the 2nd Marquess of Hertford (and also became the mistress of the Prince of Wales, later George IV). Together, they were the parents of four sons and five daughters, including:

- John Charles Ramsden (1788–1836), MP for Malton and Yorkshire, who married Isabella Dundas (1790–1887), daughter of Thomas Dundas, 1st Baron Dundas of Aske and granddaughter of William Fitzwilliam, 3rd Earl Fitzwilliam.
- Rear-Admiral William Ramsden (1789–1852), who married Lady Annabella Paulet, daughter of Charles Ingoldsby Paulet, 13th Marquess of Winchester.
- Louisa Mary Isabella Ramsden (d. 1872), who married Lord George Quin, son of Thomas Taylour, 1st Marquess of Headfort (after the death of his first wife, Lady Georgiana Spencer, daughter of George Spencer, 2nd Earl Spencer).
- Elizabeth Frances Ramsden (d. 1824), who married Edward Hawke-Harvey, 4th Baron Hawke (1799–1869), son of Edward Hawke-Harvey, 3rd Baron Hawke.
- Captain Henry James Ramsden (1799–1871), who married Hon. Frederica Selina Law, daughter of Edward Law, 1st Baron Ellenborough.
- Charles Ramsden (1801–1891), who married Lady Harriet Frances Byng, daughter of John Byng, 1st Earl of Strafford.
- Caroline Margaret Ramsden (d. 1847), who married Reverend Lord Charles Paulet (1802–1870), son of Charles Paulet, 13th Marquess of Winchester.
- Anne Ramsden
- Frances Catherine Ramsden (1806–1853), who married Lowther Pennington, 3rd Baron Muncaster, son of Lowther Pennington, 2nd Baron Muncaster.

He died at his home, Hamilton Place, Piccadilly, in 1839. As his eldest son predeceased him, the baronetcy thus passed to John Charles' son Sir John William Ramsden, 5th Baronet, who married Lady Helen Guendolen Seymour, daughter of Edward Seymour, 12th Duke of Somerset. Through his daughter Frances, he was a grandfather of Gamel Pennington, 4th Baron Muncaster and Josslyn Pennington, 5th Baron Muncaster.

== See also ==
- Ramsden baronets
- Ramsden Estate

Parliament of Great Britain
| Preceded by Hon. Sir Joseph Yorke; Richard Neville | Member of Parliament for Grampound; 1780–1784; With: Thomas Lucas | Succeeded by Hon. John Somers Cocks; Francis Baring |
Baronetage of England
| Preceded by John Ramsden | Baronet (of Byram); 1769–1839 | Succeeded by William Ramsden |
