= Pennington =

Pennington may refer to:

== Places ==
=== Australia ===
- Pennington, South Australia a suburb in Adelaide, Australia

=== South Africa ===
- Pennington, KwaZulu-Natal, South Africa

=== United Kingdom ===
- Pennington, Cumbria, village
  - St Michael's Church, Pennington
- Pennington, Greater Manchester, a suburb of Greater Manchester
  - Pennington Flash Country Park, a lake formed by mining subsidence frequented by birdwatchers
  - Pennington railway station
- Pennington, Hampshire, a village in Hampshire, in the Parish of Lymington and Pennington, on the south coast of England
  - Keyhaven, Pennington, Oxey and Normandy Marshes
  - Lymington and Pennington, administrative area

=== United States ===
- New Pennington, Indiana, in Salt Creek Township, Decatur County
- Pennington, Alabama
- Pennington, Georgia
- Pennington, Minnesota, a.k.a. Cass River, a community in Beltrami County
- Pennington, New Jersey
  - Home to The Pennington School
- Pennington, Texas
- Pennington, Wisconsin
- The Pennington Biomedical Research Center in Baton Rouge, Louisiana
- Pennington Cottage, a historic home in Maryland
- Pennington County, Minnesota
- Pennington County, South Dakota
  - Pennington County Courthouse, in Rapid City
- Pennington Field, a stadium in Texas
- Pennington Formation, a geologic formation - Pennington Gap, Virginia
- Pennington Gap, Virginia, a town
- Pennington House (Clarksville, Arkansas)
- Pennington Lake, a lake in Minnesota
- Pennington/Prospect, Trenton, New Jersey, a neighborhood of Trenton
- Pennington Railroad Station, in Pennington, New Jersey
- Pennington Traditional School, a school in Manassas, Virginia
- Sarah Pennington House, a private house in Petoskey, Michigan
- S.A. Pennington House, in Jefferson Davis Parish, Louisiana

== People ==
see Pennington (surname)

== Other ==
- Patrick Pennington, fictional character in novel Pennington's Seventeenth Summer
- Pennington clamp
- Penningtons, a Canadian fashion store
- Pennington v Waine, an English trusts law case (2002)

== See also ==
- Penington, surname
