= Ramsden =

Ramsden may refer to:

Places

- Ramsden, Orpington, England
- Ramsden, Oxfordshire, England, a village and civil parish
- Ramsden, Worcestershire, England, a hamlet
- Ramsden Bellhouse, a village in Essex, England
- Ramsden Park, Toronto, Canada
- Ramsden (crater), on the Moon
- 8001 Ramsden, an asteroid

Other uses

- Ramsden (surname), people with the surname
- Ramsden Baronets, two baronetcies
- USS Ramsden (DE-382), a destroyer escort between 1943 and 1974
- Ramsden surveying instruments
- Ramsden eyepiece

== See also ==
- Ramsdens Cup, the former name for sponsorship reasons of the Scottish Challenge Cup, a Scottish Association Football competition
- Harry Ramsden's, British restaurant chain
