= Ardverikie House =

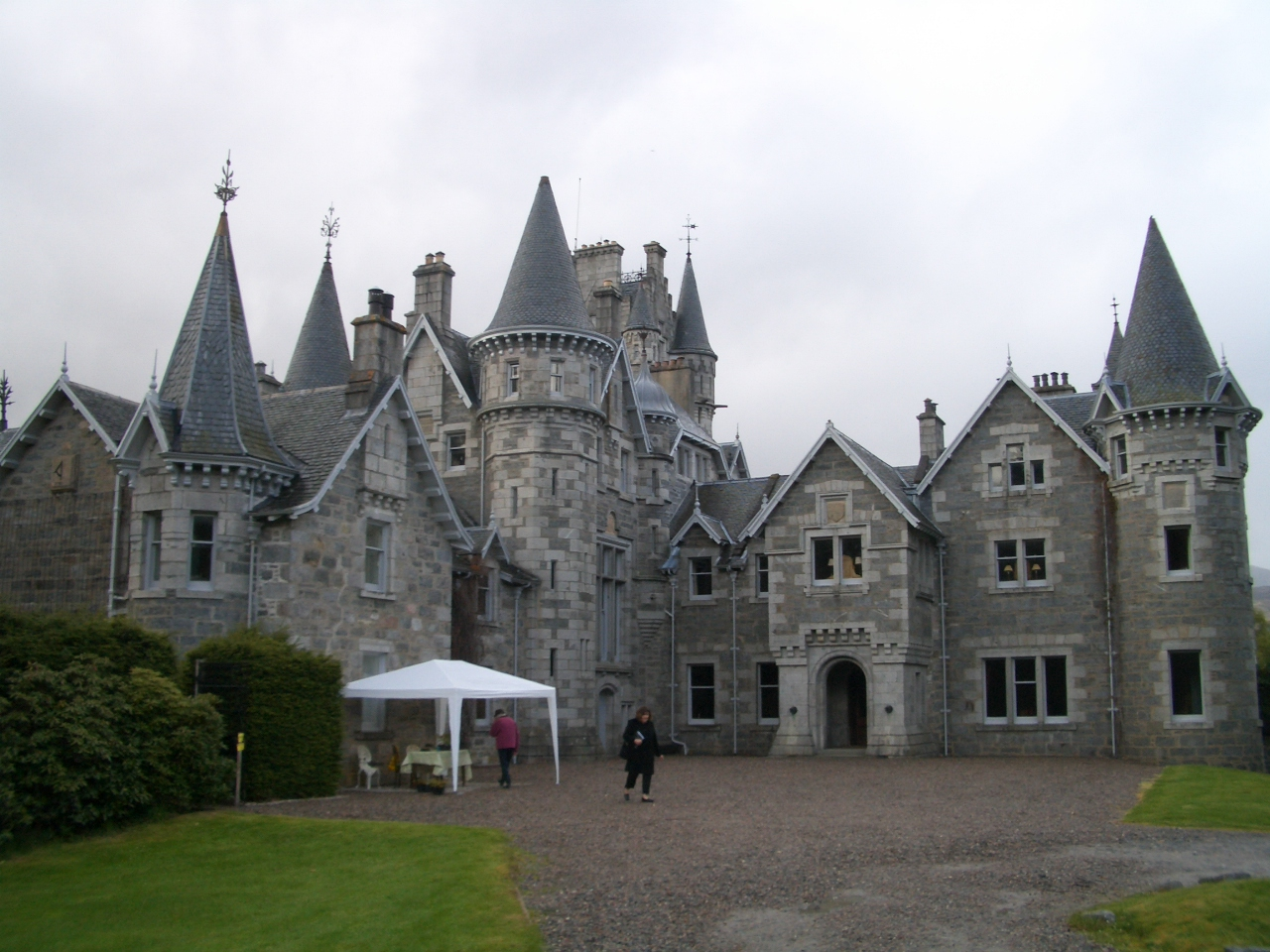

- Location in the Highlands
- 56.9557°N 4.4540°W

Listed Building – Category A
- Designated: 10 May 1971
- Reference no.: LB6910

Ardverikie House is a 19th-century Scottish baronial house in Kinloch Laggan, Newtonmore, Inverness-shire, Scottish Highlands. The house was made famous as the fictional Glenbogle estate in the BBC series Monarch of the Glen.

== History ==
The lands historically belonged to Clan Macpherson. The 20th chief, Ewen Macpherson, leased Benalder and Ardverikie in 1844 to The 2nd Marquess of Abercorn, an Ulster-Scots peer, "one of the trend setters in the emerging interest in deer stalking in Scotland." The Marquess expanded the original shooting lodge. He served as Groom of the Stool to Prince Albert, husband of Queen Victoria, who along with the prince spent three weeks at Ardverikie in the late summer of 1847, during the Great Famine in Lord Abercorn's native Ireland.

In 1860, Lord Abercorn transferred the lease to Lord Henry Bentinck, another stalking enthusiast, who lived there until his death in 1870.

Sir John Ramsden purchased the Ardverikie and Benalder forests in 1871 for £107,500 (equivalent to £10,948,016 in 2025). In 1873, the house was destroyed by fire, and was rebuilt from 1874 to 1878. It was rebuilt in the popular style of Scottish baronial architecture, designed by the architect John Rhind.

Ramsden's son, Sir John Frecheville Ramsden, inherited the lands after his father's death in 1914. The majority of the land was sold off following the two World Wars, and in 1956 Sir John transferred the Ardverikie Estate to a family company under the chairmanship of his son, Sir William Pennington-Ramsden. The company, Ardverikie Estate Limited, still owns and manages the estate today. The estate does business renting cottages and letting the property for weddings.

== Filming location ==
Ardverikie House and its estate have been used as a location for filming. It is most recognisable as the Glenbogle Estate in the BBC Television series Monarch of the Glen, that ran for seven series from 2000 to 2005. It was also used in Miss Marple: A Murder is Announced (1985), the films Mrs Brown (1997), Salmon Fishing in the Yemen (2011), and Outlaw King (2018). The estate has been featured in the series Outlander, and in the first, second, fourth, fifth and sixth seasons of The Crown, standing in for Balmoral Castle.

During summer 2019, filming of No Time to Die was taking place in the town of Aviemore and the surrounding Cairngorms National Park with some scenes shot at the Ardverikie Estate.

In October 2020, filming for The Grand Tour special "Lochdown" took place at Ardverikie House, with presenters Jeremy Clarkson, Richard Hammond, and James May staying the night on the estate.

== See also ==
- Clan Macpherson
- Monarch of the Glen
- Balmoral Castle, the highland residence of the British Royal Family, which is architecturally similar.
- Ramsden baronets
