= Penington =

Penington is a surname indicating a family origin in Pennington, Lancashire; Pennington, Cumbria; or Pennington, Hampshire. Some members of the family changed the spelling to Pennington in the 14th century.

Those bearing it include:

- David Penington (1930–2023), Australian doctor
- Isaac Penington (Lord Mayor) (1584–1661), English merchant and Lord Mayor of the City of London
- Isaac Penington (Quaker) (1616–1679), English religious activist, son of the aforementioned Isaac
- Sir Isaac Pennington (1745–1817), British physician
- John B. Penington (1825–1902), American politician

== See also ==
- Pennington (surname)
- Pennington (disambiguation)
