= Joseph Yorke, 1st Baron Dover =

British Army officer, diplomat and politician

General The Right Honourable The Lord Dover KB PC
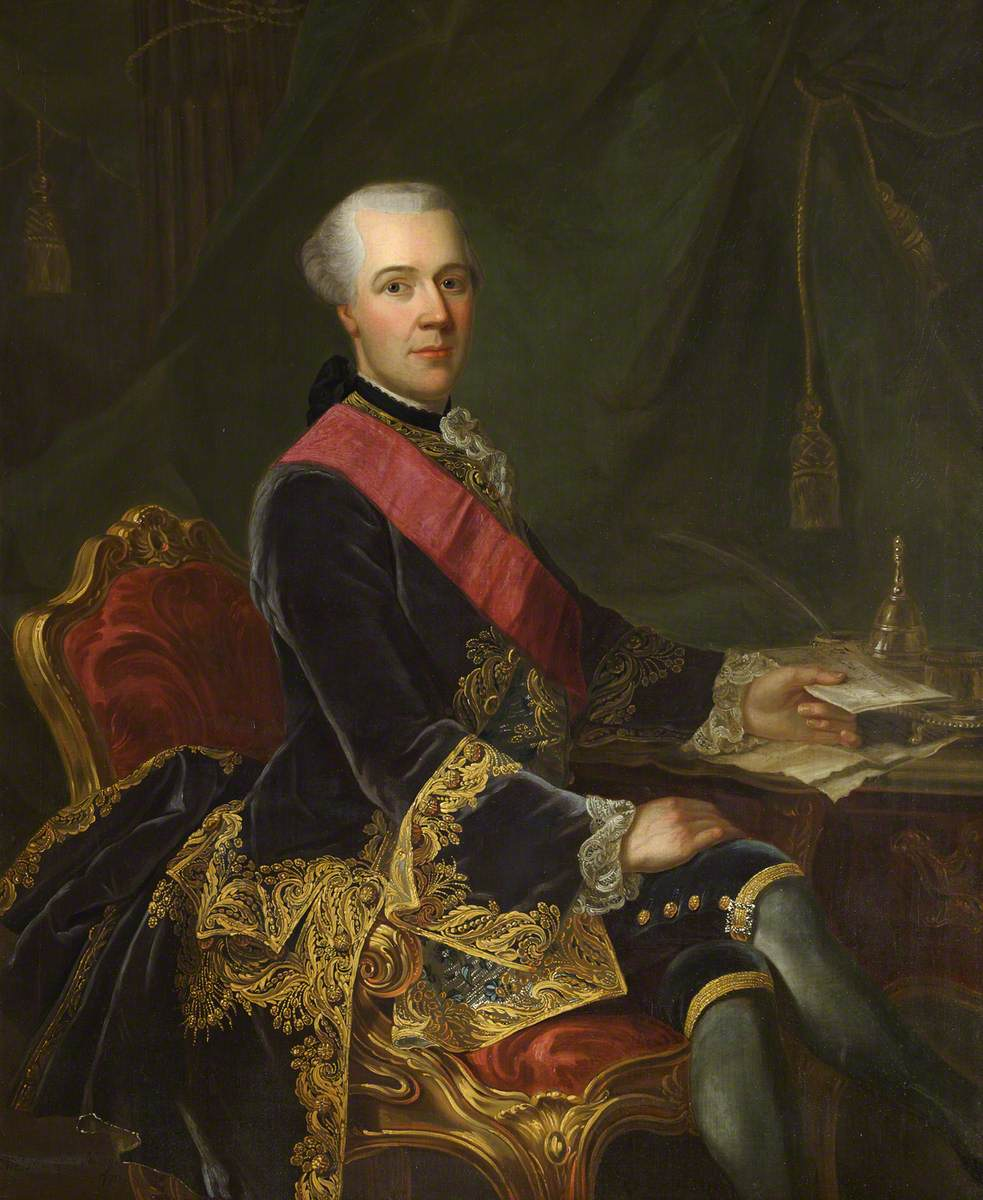
- Portrait by Joseph Samuel Webster, 1770
- Born: Joseph Yorke; 24 June 1724
- Died: 2 December 1792 (aged 68)

General Joseph Yorke, 1st Baron Dover, KB, PC (24 June 1724 – 2 December 1792), styled The Honourable Joseph Yorke until 1761 and The Honourable Sir Joseph Yorke between 1761 and 1788, was a British Army officer, diplomat and Whig politician.

== Background ==
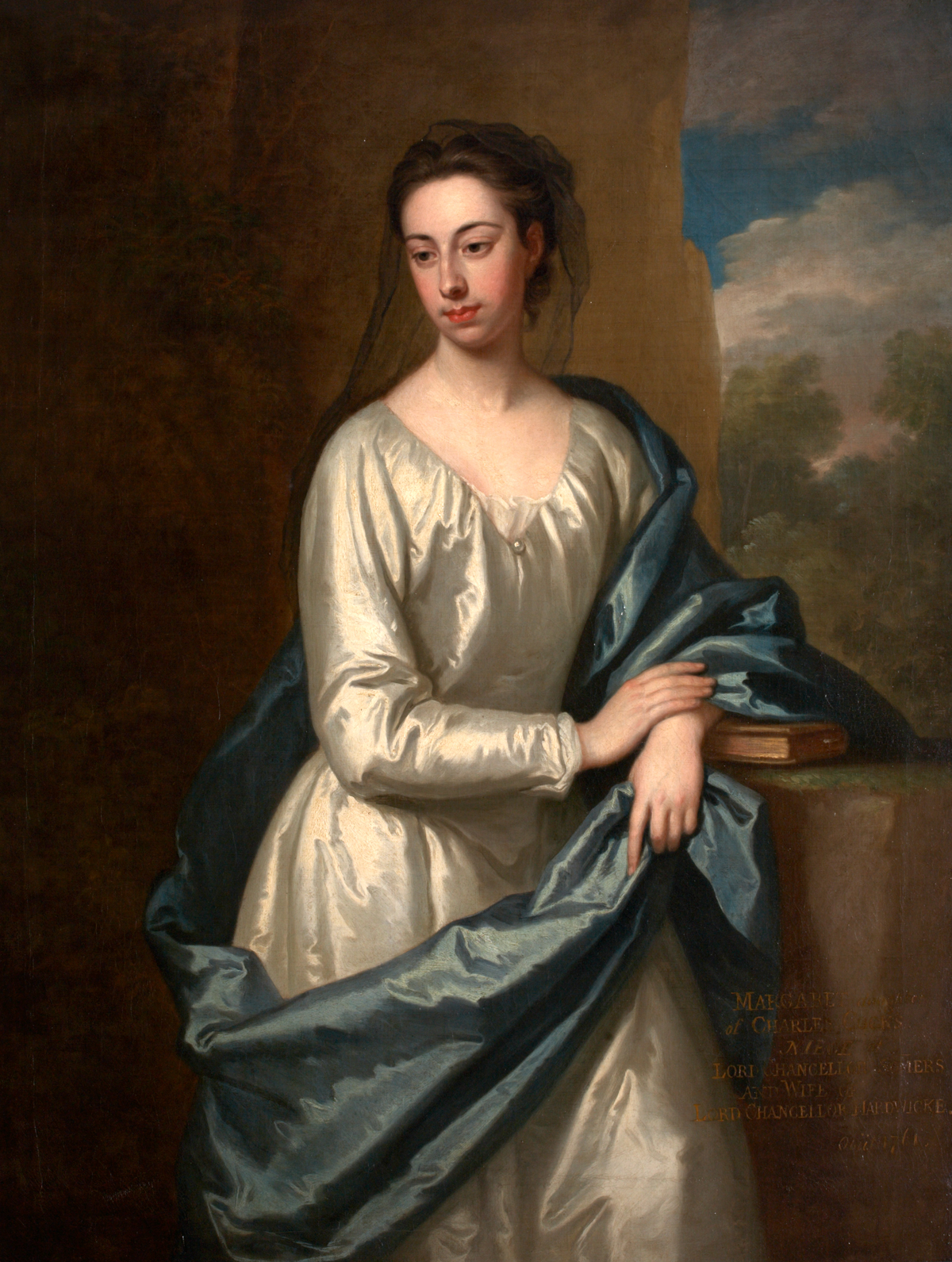
Portrait of Margaret Yorke, Joseph's mother

Yorke was the third son of Philip Yorke, 1st Earl of Hardwicke, by Margaret, daughter of Charles Cocks. Philip Yorke, 2nd Earl of Hardwicke, Charles Yorke and James Yorke were his brothers.

== Career ==
Yorke was commissioned an ensign in the 2nd Regiment of Foot Guards on 25 April 1741, and was promoted to lieutenant in the 1st Regiment of Foot Guards on 24 April 1743. Yorke served in the War of the Austrian Succession as an aide-de-camp to the Duke of Cumberland, and fought in the Battle of Fontenoy on 11 May 1745. On 27 May, he became captain and lieutenant-colonel, commanding a company in the 2nd Guards. On 1 November 1749, he was appointed an aide-de-camp to the King, and on 18 March 1755, colonel of the 9th Regiment of Foot. He became a Major-General in 1758, a Lieutenant-General in 1760 and a full General in 1777.

In 1749 he was appointed Secretary to the British Embassy in Paris. In 1751 he became Minister Plenipotentiary to the Dutch Republic, a post he held for the next thirty years. He was involved in the Anglo-Prussian Convention in 1758. His post was upgraded to that of ambassador in 1761. During his tenure, the Dutch were nominally allied with the British, but remained neutral in the Seven Years' War (1756-63), and in the American Revolutionary War(1775-83) initially remained neutral and in 1780 allied with the Americans. Britain had sought to tap the Scots Regiment stationed in the Dutch Republic to fight the Americans, but Yorke's plea was rebuffed and relations between the two nations damaged. As a diplomat of long-standing, Yorke had few Dutch friends and contemporaries noted "he had scorn for the [Dutch] Republic."

He also sat in the House of Commons for East Grinstead between 1751 and 1761, for Dover between 1761 and 1774 and for Grampound between 1774 and 1780. He was appointed a Knight Companion of the Order of the Bath (KB) in 1761 and sworn of the Privy Council in 1768. In 1788 he was raised to the peerage as Lord Dover, Baron of the Town and Port of Dover, in the County of Kent.

== Family ==
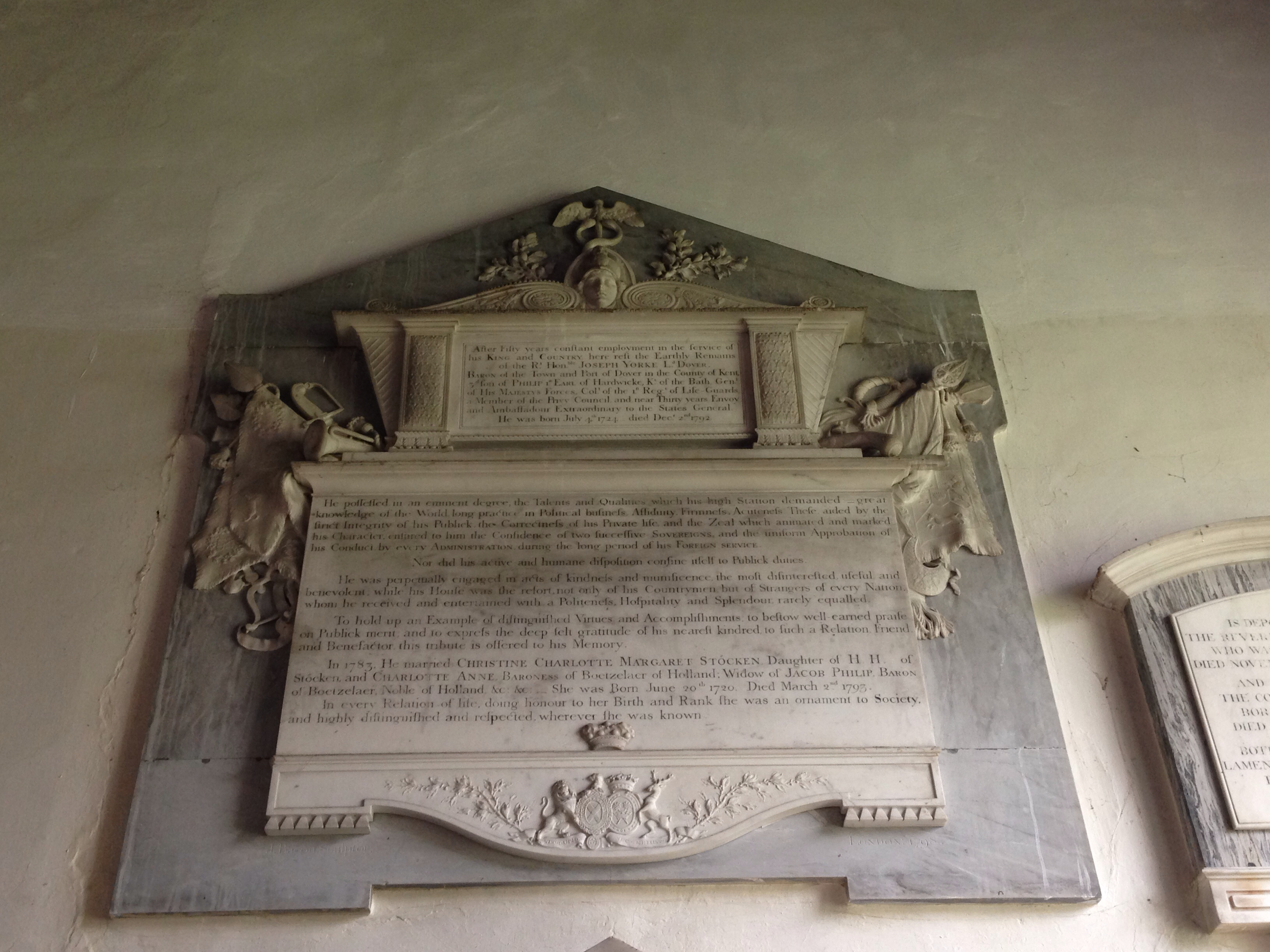
Joseph Yorke memorial, St Andrew's Church, Wimpole, Cambridgeshire

Lord Dover married Christiana Charlotte Margaret, daughter of Johan Henrik, Baron de Stöcken, a Danish nobleman, in 1783. They had no children. He died in December 1792, aged 68, when the barony became extinct. Lady Dover only survived her husband by three months and died in March 1793.

== Arms ==
Coat of arms of Joseph Yorke, 1st Baron Dover
Coronet A coronet of an Baron Crest A lion's head erased proper collared gules on the collar a bezant. Escutcheon Argent on a saltire azure a bezant, a mullet for difference. Supporters Dexter: a lion or, gorged with a collar gules charged with a bezant between two mullets sable; Sinister: a stag proper attired, unguled, and collared as the dexter. Motto Nec cupias, nec metuas.

Parliament of Great Britain
Preceded by Sir Whistler Webster; Sydney Smythe	Member of Parliament for East Grinstead; 1751–1761; With: Sir Whistler Webster	Succeeded by Earl of Middlesex; Lord George Sackville
Preceded by Lord George Sackville; Sir Edward Simpson	Member of Parliament for Dover; 1761–1774; With: Sir Edward Simpson 1761–1765; Marquess of Lorne 1765–1766; John Bindley 1766–1768; Viscount Villiers 1768–1770; Sir Thomas Hales, Bt 1770–1773; Thomas Barret 1773–1774	Succeeded by John Henniker; John Trevanion
Preceded by Grey Cooper; Charles Wolfran Cornwall	Member of Parliament for Grampound; 1774–1780; With: Richard Neville	Succeeded by Sir John Ramsden, Bt; Thomas Lucas
Military offices
Preceded by Hon. John Waldegrave	Colonel of the 9th Regiment of Foot; 1755–1758	Succeeded by William Whitmore
Preceded by Hon. John Waldegrave	Colonel of the 8th Regiment of Dragoons; 1758–1760	Succeeded by John Severne
Preceded by John Mostyn	Colonel of the 5th Regiment of Dragoons; 1760–1787	Succeeded by Robert Cuninghame
Preceded by Hon. Thomas Gage	Colonel of the 11th Regiment of (Light) Dragoons; 1787–1789	Succeeded by Studholme Hodgson
Preceded by The Marquess of Lothian	Colonel of the 1st Regiment of Life Guards; 1789–1792	Succeeded by The Earl of Harrington
Diplomatic posts
Preceded by The Earl of Holderness	Minister Plenipotentiary to the United Provinces; 1751–1761	Office upgraded to Ambassador to the United Provinces
Preceded by Minister Plenipotentiary to the United Provinces	Ambassador to the United Provinces; 1761–1781	No representation due to Fourth Anglo-Dutch War
Peerage of Great Britain
New creation	Baron Dover; 1788–1792	Extinct
