= 131st Regiment of Foot =

Infantry regiment of the British Army

The 131st Regiment of Foot was an infantry regiment of the British Army, created in 1793 and disbanded in 1796. General Henry Edward Fox raised the regiment, with the colonelcy being transferred to Lowther Pennington, 2nd Baron Muncaster, shortly thereafter.
