= Dilessi murders =

Murder of 4 travelers in Greece, 1870

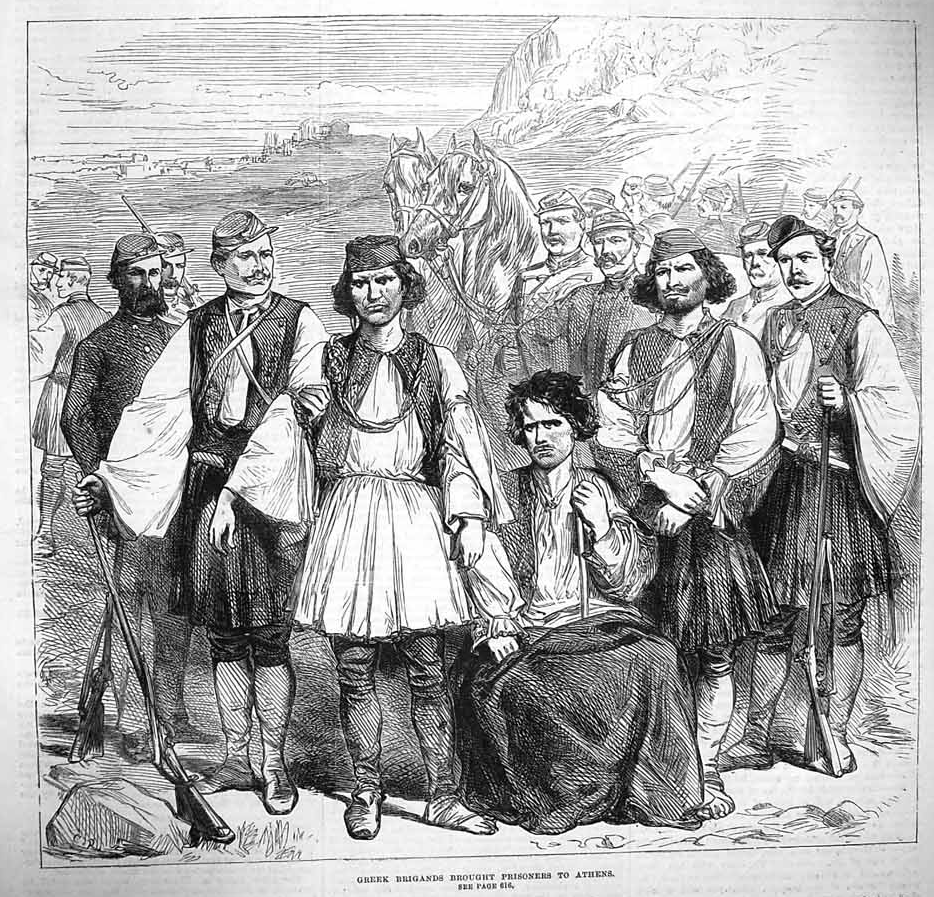
The brigands responsible for the murders are brought to Athens for trial, from The Illustrated London News

The Dilessi murders were committed between 4 and 7 April 1870, when one Italian and three English aristocrats were murdered at Dilesi (Greek: Δήλεσι), a coastal town in eastern Boeotia, by Greek brigands while touring the area near Marathon. The events triggered a crisis between Greece and the United Kingdom.

In 1870 an English party, consisting of Lord and Lady Muncaster, Mr Frederick Vyner, Mr Edward Lloyd, Mr Edward Herbert, and the Count de Boyl, was captured at Oropos, near Marathon, and a ransom of £25,000 was demanded. Lord and Lady Muncaster were set at liberty to seek for the ransom, but the Greek government sent troops in pursuit of the brigands, and the other prisoners were then murdered.

== See also ==
- Josslyn Pennington, 5th Baron Muncaster
