= Sir John Austin, 1st Baronet =

British politician

Sir John Austin

Sir John Austin, 1st Baronet (9 March 1824 – 30 March 1906) was a Liberal Party politician in England.

At the 1886 general election, he was elected as Member of Parliament for Osgoldcross in the West Riding of Yorkshire, defeating the sitting MP Sir John Ramsden, Bt. (a former Liberal who had joined the Liberal Unionist Party).

Austin was re-elected in 1892 and 1895, but in 1899 he left the Liberal Party to sit as an "Independent Liberal". He then resigned his seat to seek approval of his change of allegiance, and won the resulting by-election. He was returned as an "Independent Liberal" in 1900, and stood down from the House of Commons at the 1906 general election.

He was created a baronet of Red Hill, Yorkshire in 1894.

Parliament of the United Kingdom
| Preceded by Sir John Ramsden, Bt. | Member of Parliament for Osgoldcross; 1886 – 1906 | Succeeded by Sir Joseph Compton-Rickett |
Baronetage of the United Kingdom
| New creation | Baronet (of Red Hill, Yorkshire); 1894–1906 | Succeeded by William Michael Byron Austin |
