= Joseph Compton-Rickett =

British politician

The Right Honourable Sir Joseph Compton-Rickett DL

HM Paymaster General
- In office 1916–1919
- Prime Minister: David Lloyd George
- Preceded by: Arthur Henderson
- Succeeded by: Tudor Walters

Member of Parliament for Scarborough
- In office 7 August 1895 – 8 February 1906
- Preceded by: Sir George Sitwell, Bt
- Succeeded by: Walter Rea

Member of Parliament for Osgoldcross
- In office 8 February 1906 – 25 November 1918
- Preceded by: Sir John Austin, Bt
- Succeeded by: John Stephenson Rowntree

Member of Parliament for Pontefract
- In office 14 December 1918 – 30 July 1919
- Preceded by: Frederick Handel Booth
- Succeeded by: Walter Forrest

Personal details
- Born: Joseph Rickett; 13 February 1847 London, England, UK
- Died: 30 July 1919 (aged 72) UK
- Party: Liberal Party

Sir Joseph Compton-Rickett, DL PC (13 February 1847 – 30 July 1919), was a British Liberal Party politician. He was also an industrialist (until 1902), lay preacher, and writer. He wrote poetry and fiction, as well as on such topics as popular philosophy. He sometimes wrote under the pseudonym Maurice Baxter.

== Background ==
He was born in London as Joseph Rickett, the eldest son of Joseph Rickett, of East Hoathly. He was educated at King Edward VI School, Bath. In 1868 he married Catharine Sarah Gamble (1847–1933). They had ten children. There were four sons and four daughters living when he died in 1919. He was knighted on 24 December 1907. He assumed by Royal licence the additional surname of Compton in 1908.

In 1911 he was appointed to the Privy Council.

== Professional career ==
He was in business and interested in various commercial undertakings. In 1902, he retired from the chairmanship of several coal trade companies to devote himself to his political career.

== Political career ==
Sir Joseph Compton-Rickett in 1919

He was Member of Parliament (MP) for Scarborough from 1895–1906. He had gained the seat from the Conservatives in 1895 and held it in the 1900 election. In early 1903 he announced his intention to step down as a candidate in this constituency at the next election, stating that he ′desired a constituency in which his attention will not be distracted by local controversies from the political and social problems which keep him in public office.′ He was then Member of Parliament for Osgoldcross from 1906–1918. In 1906 he re-gained the seat that had been Independent Liberal since 1899. He held office in the Coalition Government of David Lloyd George as Paymaster General from 1916 to 1919. In 1917 he served as a Charity Commissioner.

He was Member of Parliament for the Pontefract constituency that largely absorbed Osgoldcross from 1918 until his death aged 72 the following year. For the execution of his will, Sir Joseph's eldest son, Arthur Compton-Rickett, was appointed the public trustee.

=== Electoral record ===
General election 1906: Osgoldcross
Party	Candidate	Votes	%	±%
Liberal	Joseph Rickett	8,482	66.1	
Conservative	Granville Wheler	4,358	33.9	n/a
Majority		4,124	32.1	
Turnout		12,840		
Liberal gain from Independent Liberal		Swing		

General election January 1910: Osgoldcross
Party	Candidate	Votes	%	±%
Liberal	Joseph Compton-Rickett	9,517	66.3	
Conservative	Gerald de la Pryme Hargreaves	4,840	33.7	
Majority		4,677	32.6	
Turnout				
Liberal hold		Swing		

General election December 1910: Osgoldcross
Party	Candidate	Votes	%	±%
Liberal	Joseph Compton-Rickett	8,518	66.2	−0.1
Conservative	Malcolm Campbell-Johnston	4,347	33.8	+0.1
Majority		4,171	32.4	−0.2
Turnout			70.4	
Liberal hold		Swing	-0.1	

Pontefract General Election, 1918
Party	Candidate	Votes	%	±%
Liberal	Joseph Compton-Rickett	8,561	62.9	
Labour	Isaac Burns	5,047	37.1	
Majority		3514	25.8	
Turnout			45.6	
Liberal hold		Swing		

Parliament of the United Kingdom
Preceded by Sir George Sitwell, Bt	Member of Parliament for Scarborough; 1895 – 1906	Succeeded by Walter Rea
Preceded by Sir John Austin, Bt	Member of Parliament for Osgoldcross; 1906 – 1918	Constituency abolished
Preceded by Handel Booth	Member of Parliament for Pontefract; 1918 – 1919	Succeeded by Walter Forrest
Political offices
Preceded by Arthur Henderson	Paymaster General; 1916–1919	Succeeded by Sir Tudor Walters
