= Lowther Pennington, 3rd Baron Muncaster =

Lowther Augustus John Pennington, 3rd Baron Muncaster (14 December 1802 – 30 April 1838), styled Hon. Lowther Pennington from 1813 to 1818, was a landowner in northern England and an Irish peer.

Lowther was the only son of General Lowther Pennington, who married the widow Esther Morrison in January 1802 while on half-pay. The general inherited the barony of Muncaster from his brother in 1813, and died in 1818, leaving Lowther to succeed him in the barony and estates.

On 15 December 1828, Muncaster married Frances Catherine Ramsden (1806–1853), the daughter of Sir John Ramsden, 4th Baronet. They had seven children:

- Hon. Fanny Caroline Pennington (26 Aug 1829 – 12 July 1864)
- Gamel Pennington, 4th Baron Muncaster (1831–1862)
- Hon. Josslyn Pennington (b. and d. 24 August 1833)
- Josslyn Pennington, 5th Baron Muncaster (1834–1917)
- Hon. Rachel Matilda Pennington (b. and d. March 1836)
- Hon. Alan Joseph Pennington (5 April 1837 – 14 June 1913), of Ragdale Hall, married on 9 December 1880 Anna Eleanora Hartopp, without children
- Hon. Louisa Theodosia Pennington (1838 – 17 June 1886), married on 25 November 1858 Edgar Atheling Drummond (1825–1893) and had issue

Muncaster died on 30 April 1838 at the Green Park Hotel in Piccadilly, and was buried on 15 May at Warter. His eldest son Gamel succeeded him.

Peerage of Ireland
Preceded by Lowther Pennington	Baron Muncaster; 1818–1838	Succeeded by Gamel Pennington
