= Thomas Lucas (MP for Grampound) =

British West India merchant and politician

- Born: c.1720
- Died: 29 September 1784; Lee Place, Kent, England
- Occupations: West India merchant, politician, philanthropist
- Known for: MP for Grampound; President of Guy's Hospital
- Office: Member of Parliament for Grampound
- Predecessor: Richard Neville, Sir Joseph Yorke
- Successor: John Somers Cocks, Francis Baring
- Spouse(s): Ann Jones, Mary Page, Elizabeth Payne
- Relatives: Possibly related to Eliza Lucas; widow married John Julius Angerstein

Thomas Lucas (c.1720–1784) was an English West India merchant, at the end of his life Member of Parliament for Grampound. He was treasurer of Guy's Hospital 1764–1774 and then president of its board of governors until his death.

== Business interests ==
His directorships included the Union Society in 1759, the South Sea Company in 1763, and the Union Fire Office in 1764. He held them all until he died.

Thomas Lucas's West Indies interests were in St Kitts, Leeward Islands and, in partnership with William Coleman, as a London agent for other Leeward Islands planters. The Legacies of British Slave-ownership database lists Lucas as a sugar-factor and slave owner.

He was very probably a close relative of Eliza Lucas, born in Antigua Leeward Islands in 1723.

== Charities ==
His continuing public involvement in aiding other charities besides Guy's included:

- Governor and then Vice President of the Hospitals for Smallpox and Inoculation
- Governor of St Luke's Hospital for Lunatics
- The Society for Promoting Religious Knowledge among the Poor

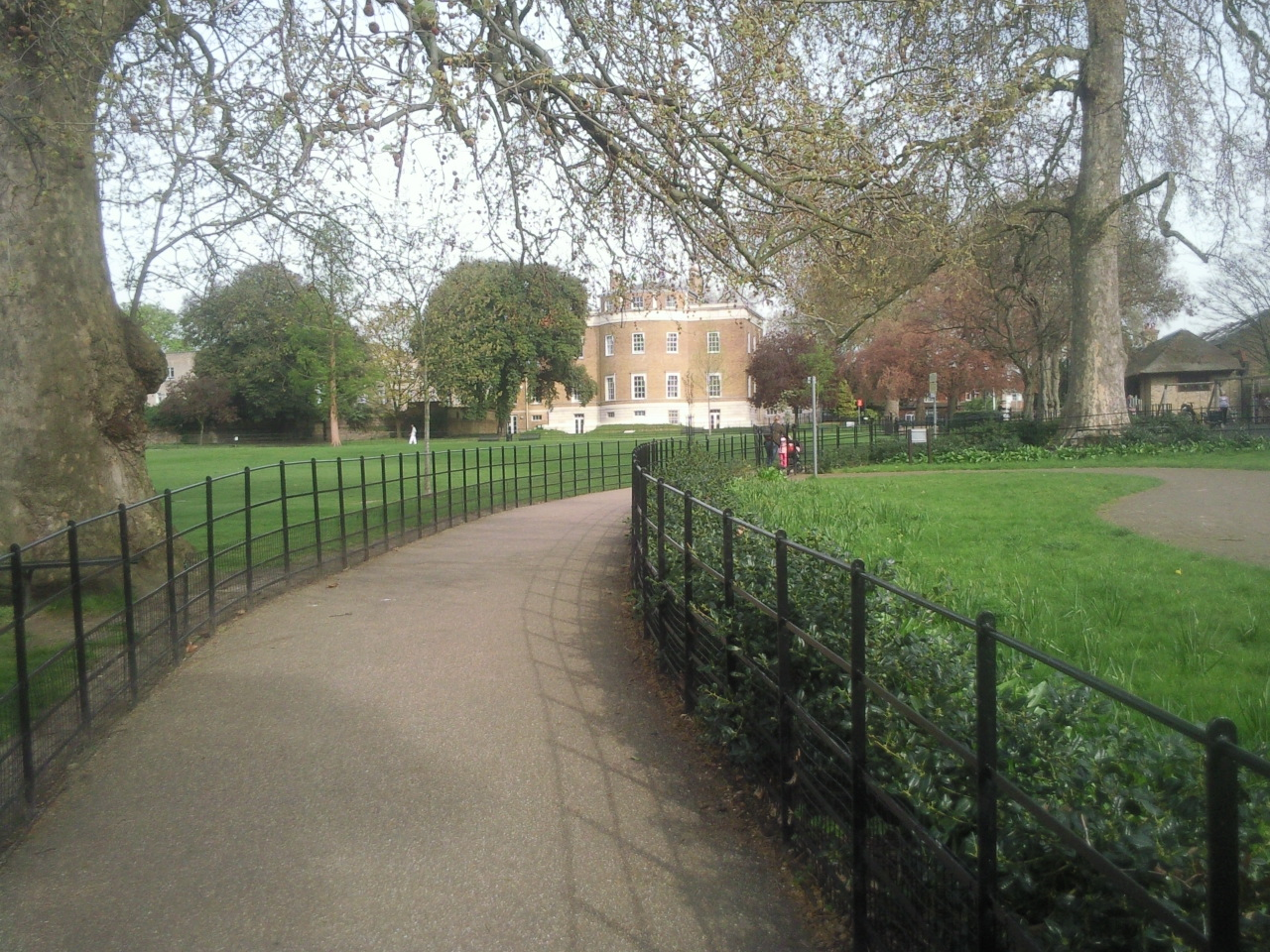
Lee House, Kent

== Private life ==
Lucas's origins were considered a mystery soon after his death. His easy association with the nobility and other ties suggest he could have been, if not illegitimate, heir to the barony of Lucas of Shenfield and so a part of the family of Henry Grey (c1664-1740) Duke of Kent.

Lucas married three times: Ann Jones, Mary Page and Elizabeth Payne; within his circle of business associates but left no surviving issue. His widow, Elizabeth daughter of Rev. Joseph Payne and a niece of Lewis Way a previous president of Guy's Hospital, married John Julius Angerstein.

Their portrait by Sir Thomas Lawrence is in the Louvre. It is believed that after her mother's early death Eliza and her sister were raised by their childless great-uncle and aunt, Mr & Mrs George Payne

His London residence was in Albemarle Street. He also maintained a country residence at Lee Place, Kent, the property of the Boone family. About 1770 he employed the East India Company architect Richard Jupp to build him a new house on an old site on land which he had purchased from the Lethieullier family. The new house, where he died on 29 September 1784, was later known as Lee Manor. It is now used as a public library and its gardens have become a public park: Manor House Gardens.

== Parliament ==
His newly achieved parliamentary seat in 1780 for the Grampound constituency was lost in the General Election in May 1784. His seat was taken by Francis Baring, who also purchased the new house from Lucas's widow in 1796.

== Sources ==
Newspapers of his day.

Edward Hasted: The History and Topographical Survey of the county of Kent. 1797

Parliament of Great Britain
Preceded by Richard Neville; Sir Joseph Yorke	Member of Parliament for Grampound; 1780 – 1784; With: Sir John Ramsden, Bt	Succeeded by John Somers Cocks; Francis Baring
