= RAF Staff College, Bulstrode Park =

The RAF Staff College, Bulstrode Park, was a satellite staff college for the Royal Air Force based at Bulstrode Park.

== History ==
The college opened in 1941 at Bulstrode Park with the objective of providing staff officer training primarily for foreign officers, not all from Western Europe. A major portion of the college at Bulstrode Park moved to Ramslade House in Bracknell in July 1945 to create the RAF Staff College, Bracknell. In 1948 what remained of the college at Bulstrode Park moved back to Andover.
