= 1899 Osgoldcross by-election =

UK parliamentary by-election

The 1899 Osgoldcross by-election was a parliamentary by-election for the British House of Commons constituency of Osgoldcross in the West Riding of Yorkshire held on 5 July 1899.

== Vacancy ==
The by-election was caused by the resignation of the sitting Liberal MP, Sir John Austin. Austin had been MP for Osgoldcross since 1886 but he found himself in dispute with his constituency Liberal Association when he voted against certain measures in Parliament which were supported by the Liberal Party nationally. Some of these issues were on religious questions and Sir John Austin was a Roman Catholic. In some quarters the dispute with Sir John Austin was seen as an attack on him because of his religion, although he had a record of getting on well with his traditionally nonconformist constituency. However one of the issues that Austin championed was opposing the power of local authorities to impose a veto on liquor sales and this brought him into conflict with many of his pro-temperance chapel Liberals. A meeting of the Osgoldcoss Liberal Association was held at Pontefract on 15 June 1899 and a vote of no confidence in Austin was passed. A further motion of regret at his actions was also passed but, no doubt in an effort to heal the breach between MP and local party, it was declared that Austin had broken no pledges made in his election addresses.

== Candidates ==
=== Austin ===
Following the vote of censure against him Sir John Austin decided to resign his seat and appeal directly to his constituents on the points at issue. He chose to contest the election as a Liberal and was sometimes also referred to in the press as a Radical. However, in view of his breach with the official party Austin is referred to here as an Independent Liberal.

=== Liberals ===
The local Liberal Association were divided in loyalty, with some believing Austin’s record required their support. A meeting at Castleford on 23 June 1899, chaired by Mr Arthur Hartley the chairman of Osgoldcross Liberals, at which Austin declared himself to be a loyal supporter of Liberal leader Sir Henry Campbell-Bannerman, selected Austin as Liberal candidate to fight the by-election. However another meeting of Liberals at Pontefract the same day adopted Charles Henry Roberts, the son-in-law of Lady Carlisle, as an Independent Liberal or Radical to contest the seat and this decision was endorsed by a further mass meeting at the Market Hall at Goole later that night, chaired by the president of the Osgoldcross Liberals, Frederick Andrews. Roberts declared that he supported the entire Liberal programme as formulated by William Ewart Gladstone and the meeting endorsed his candidacy saying they wanted a man who was a Liberal “all along the line”. He also described himself as the Local Veto (i.e. pro-temperance) candidate. For this reason, Roberts is described here as the official Liberal candidate.

=== Others ===
There had been a history of contested elections in Osgoldcross in recent years. In 1885 there had been a Conservative candidate. In 1886 Austin had taken the seat off the sitting Liberal Unionist MP, and in 1895 another Conservative had tried his luck. However this time, perhaps preferring not to intrude on the private grief of the Liberal Party, no other party put forward a candidate to take advantage of the Liberal split.

== Result ==
Sir John Austin retained his seat by a clear and comfortable majority, increasing his majority from 1,065 to 2,925, having obtained well over 50% of the poll. It seems likely that Sir John received many votes from Conservative supporters who had no candidate of their own to vote for and who wanted to discomfort the Liberal Party nationally.

By-election 1899: Osgoldcross
Party	Candidate	Votes	%	±%
Independent Liberal	Sir John Austin	5,818	66.8	+11.0
Liberal	Charles Henry Roberts	2,893	33.2	−22.6
Majority		2,925	33.6	N/A
Turnout		8,711	62.2	−7.9
Independent Liberal gain from Liberal		Swing		

== See also ==
- List of United Kingdom by-elections
- United Kingdom by-election records
