= John Frecheville Ramsden =

British aristocrat

Sir John Frecheville Ramsden, 6th Baronet JP DL (7 January 1877 – 6 October 1958), was a British aristocrat and landowner of estates in England, Scotland and Africa.

== Biography ==
Ramsden's parents were John William Ramsden and Lady Helen Guendolen Ramsden (née Seymour), the daughter and co-heiress of Edward Seymour, 12th Duke of Somerset. He was educated at Eton and Trinity College, Cambridge, Ramsden was commissioned into the British Army, serving in World War I with the Norfolk Yeomanry, promoted to Captain.

When his mother died in 1910 he inherited Bulstrode Park in Buckinghamshire. In 1917, he inherited Muncaster Castle.

He was appointed High Sheriff of Buckinghamshire for 1920/21.

In 1927 he purchased land in Africa, near the border between Kenya and Tanganyika Territory. He owned property near Naivasha and he was an occasional house-guest of the Happy Valley set whilst he lived in that area.

Ramsden died at Ardverikie House on 6 October 1958.

== Family ==
In 1901 he married Joan Buxton (who died in 1974), the sister of an old school friend and the eldest daughter of Lieutenant Colonel Geoffrey Fowell Buxton CB. Sir John and Lady Ramsden had issue:

- John St. Maur Ramsden, born 26 April 1902, married 20 February 1935 Lady Catherine Mary Clementina Heathcote-Drummond-Willoughby (1906–1996), and was killed in Malaysia on 7 June 1948, leaving a daughter:
  - Carola Eloise Ramsden, born 26 October 1938, married firstly 5 April 1961 George Fillmore Miller III (1934–2016), having a son (senior co-heir to the barony of Willoughby de Eresby),
    - Major Sebastian St Maur Miller born 1965, married to Emma Harries with a son and a daughter.
  - She married secondly 4 July 1974 Robert Ernest James Philippi (1932–2021), son of Colonel George Philippi MC, and died 2 August 2009, leaving another son,
    - James Jeremy George Philippi born 1975, married to Arabella MacNicol with two sons and a daughter.
- Sir (Geoffrey) William Pennington-Ramsden, 7th Baronet (1904–1986).
- Mary Joyce Ramsden, born 1907, married 1929 Major-General Sir Randle Guy Feilden, and died 2000, leaving three sons.

== See also ==
- Ramsden baronets
- Ramsden Estate
- Happy Valley

Baronetage of England
Preceded by Sir John Ramsden	Baronet (of Byram); 1914–1958	Succeeded by Sir William; Pennington-Ramsden
