= Gamel Pennington, 4th Baron Muncaster =

Irish peer (1831–1862)

Gamel Augustus Pennington, 4th Baron Muncaster (3 December 1831 – 13 June 1862), styled Hon. Gamel Pennington until 1838, was an Irish peer and British landowner. A member of an old Cumberland family, he served as High Sheriff of Cumberland in 1859. He died of illness in Italy in 1862, leaving an infant daughter to succeed to his estates, while his peerage passed to his younger brother.

== Life ==
The eldest son of Lowther Pennington, 3rd Baron Muncaster and his wife Frances, Pennington was born at Warter Priory, one of the family seats. He succeeded his father in 1838 as Baron Muncaster, and inherited the family estates in Cumberland and Yorkshire, including Muncaster Castle. Muncaster was educated at Eton from 1845 to 1849, admitted to Trinity College, Cambridge on 25 February 1850, and graduated with a Master of Arts in 1853.

On 8 June 1854, he was commissioned a deputy lieutenant of the East Riding of Yorkshire. He married Lady Jane Grosvenor, the daughter of Richard Grosvenor, 2nd Marquess of Westminster, on 2 August 1855. They had one child, Hon. Margaret "Mimi" Susan Elizabeth Pennington (1860 – 8 July 1871). Muncaster was commissioned a deputy lieutenant of Cumberland on 10 July 1856.

Lord Muncaster died on 13 June 1862 at Castellammare di Stabia, of "gastric fever" and was buried at Muncaster on 29 July. He died intestate, so while he was succeeded in the peerage by his brother, Josslyn, the Muncaster estates went to Gamel's daughter Margaret. They did pass to Josslyn when she died young in 1871.

Honorary titles
Preceded by Anthony Benn Steward	High Sheriff of Cumberland; 1859	Succeeded by Philip Howard
Peerage of Ireland
Preceded by Lowther Pennington	Baron Muncaster; 1838–1862	Succeeded by Josslyn Pennington
