= Alfred Pennington =

English footballer

Personal information
- Date of birth: 1875
- Place of birth: Burslem, England
- Position: Full-back

Senior career*
Years	Team	Apps	(Gls)
1897–1898	Bristol Eastville Rovers		
1898–1900	Grimsby Town	1	(0)
1900	Folkestone		
1900–190?	Shrewsbury Town		
- * Club domestic league appearances and goals

Alfred Pennington (1875 – after 1899) was an English professional footballer who played as a full-back.
