= John Rhind (architect) =

Scottish architect (1836–1889)

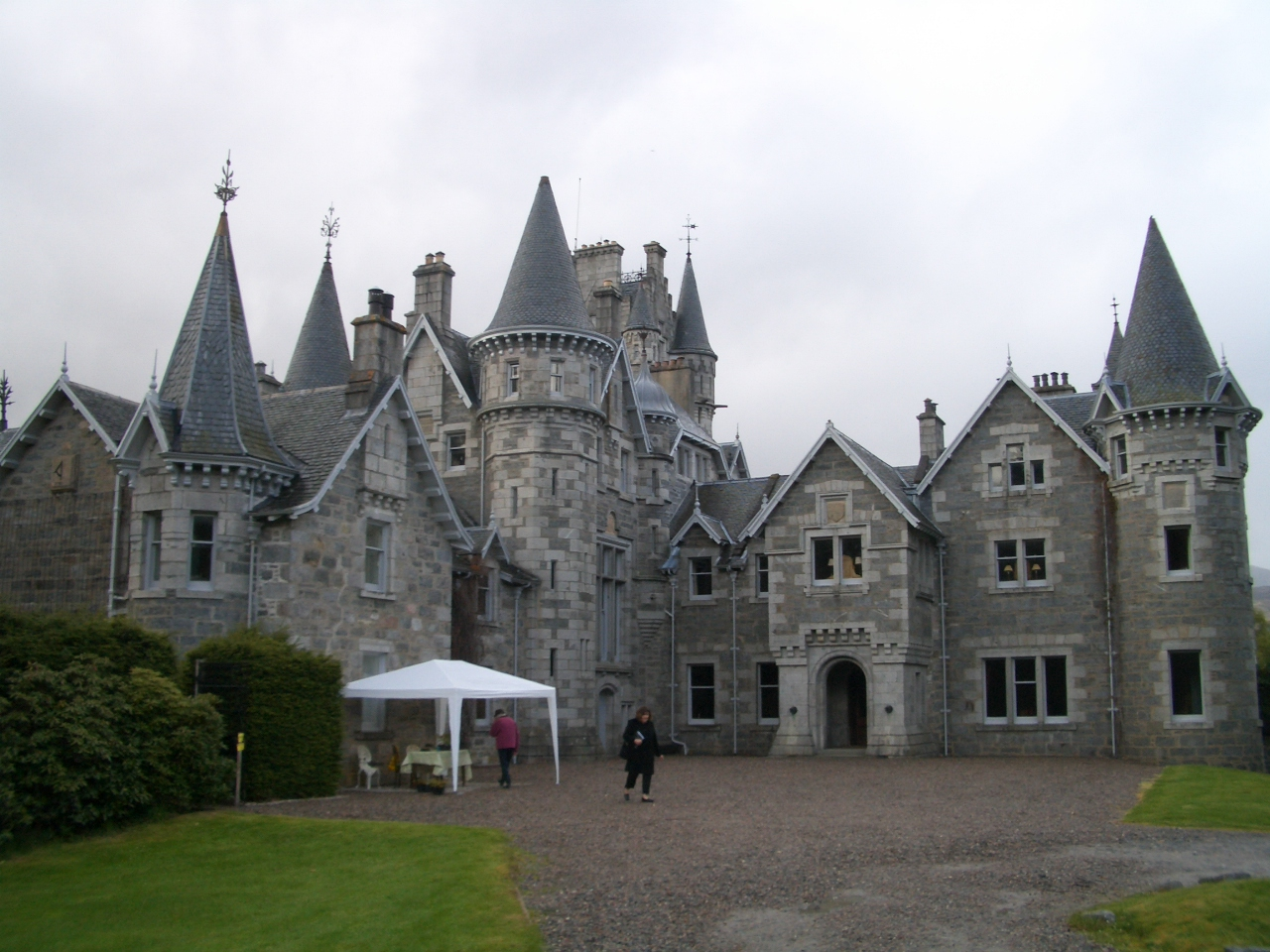
Ardverikie House, designed by John Rhind in 1871, and the setting for the BBC TV series Monarch of the Glen.

John Rhind (10 March 1836 – 10 August 1889) was an architect from Inverness, Scotland.

== Biography ==
John Rhind was born in Banffshire in 1836, son of the Inverness architect builder George Rhind and his wife Isabella Milne. He was probably initially articled to his father, but around 1854 he went to Glasgow, where he became an assistant to Campbell Douglas, remaining with him during the early years of his partnership with J. J. Stevenson. At Douglas' he became acquainted with Bruce James Talbert and took an interest in the work of Alexander 'Greek' Thomson whose influence was later to be reflected in Rhind's Imperial Hotel and Union Street buildings, both in Inverness. While in Glasgow he is said to have been a Vice-President of the Young Architectural Association of Glasgow, perhaps a junior branch of the Glasgow Architectural Society.

Around 1863 Rhind returned to Inverness and took over the architectural side of his father's business. His Glasgow experience, and bold if unacademic handling of Gothic and Scots baronial forms quickly made him a serious rival to Alexander Ross. He was elected to Inverness Town Council in 1880 and was Dean of Guild in 1883, 1884, 1885 and 1886. John Rhind RSA sculpted a marble bust of him, exhibited at the RSA in 1884.

He held offices at 3 & 9 Union Street, Inverness, from 1869 to 1889, then Portland Place, Inverness, from 1889 onwards.

In the late 1880s John Rhind's health and finances were undermined by a long-running legal dispute with Sir John Ramsden, his client at Ardverikie. He died in Perth of congestion of the lungs following a short illness on 10 August 1889. He left moveable estate of £1,251 14s 3d + £739 6s 7d.

=== James Rhind ===
John Rhind trained his younger brother, James Robert Rhind (1853–1918), in architecture, who went on to become even more acclaimed than his older brother, designing the Victorian Gothic Town House in Inverness, prior to establishing a practice in Montreal, where he designed the detail and supervised the construction of the Royal Victoria Hospital. James Rhind returned to Scotland in 1895, settling in Inverness to resume the practice of his brother and competed successfully for most of the Carnegie libraries in the Glasgow area, and for a library in London.

== Architectural works ==
Glenmoriston Manse, designed by John Rhind and built 1880

Rhind built a number of homes in the Scottish Highlands, including:

- The Royal Hotel in Inverness (1864)
- Broadford Manse (1866)
- Laggan Free Church (1867)
- Fort Augustus Free Church Manse (1868)
- Tarradale Inn, Muir of Ord (1870)
- Moy Hall (1870)
- Castlehill Church, Forres (1870–71)
- Ardverikie (1871) — used for filming the BBC TV series Monarch of the Glen
- Celtic Cross Monument to Ian Lom Macdonald, Bard of Keppoch (1873)
- Moy School and Schoolmaster’s House (1874)
- Lochardil House and Lodge, Inverness (1876)
- Inverness High School (1878) — now the Crown Primary School
- Glenmoriston Manse (1880)
- Glen Spean Lodge (1881)
- Invergarry (1885)
