= John Ramsden (cricketer) =

New Zealand cricketer

Personal information
- Born: 29 September 1878; Melbourne, Victoria, Australia
- Died: 12 August 1973 (aged 94); Christchurch, Canterbury, New Zealand

Domestic team information
- Years: Team
- 1909/10–1914/15: Otago
- Source: ESPNcricinfo, 22 May 2016

John Ramsden (29 September 1878 – 12 August 1973) was a New Zealand cricketer and cricket administrator. He played ten first-class matches for Otago between the 1909–10 season and 1914–15.

Ramsden was born at Melbourne in Australia in 1878 and played club cricket in both Victoria and Western Australia before moving to Otago in New Zealand. He played for Carisbrook Cricket club in Dunedin and in March 1910 made his senior representative debut for Otago, opening the batting against the touring Australians at Carisbrook. After being run out for a single run in his first innings, Ramsden scored three in his second. He went on to play nine more top-level matches for the provincial side, playing in all of Otago's matches in the following three seasons and two in 1914–15.

In total Ramsden scored 189 runs in first-class cricket and took 23 wickets. His highest score, and only half-century, of 74 not out came against Canterbury in 1912–13. His best bowling analysis of four wickets for the cost of nine runs came against the same side during the previous season.

Ramsden later moved to Christchurch where he worked as an importer of tea. He was a life member of both Carisbrook Cricket Club and Christchurch Golf Club and served on the New Zealand Cricket Council between 1930 and 1947. He died at Christchurch in August 1973 aged 94. An obituary was published in the New Zealand Cricket Almanack later in the year.
