= Osgoldcross (constituency) =

Parliamentary constituency in the United Kingdom, 1885–1918

- Former county constituency for the House of Commons

1885–1918
- Seats: one
- Created from: Eastern West Riding of Yorkshire
- Replaced by: Barkston Ash, Hemsworth and Pontefract

Osgoldcross was a parliamentary constituency in the Osgoldcross Rural District of West Yorkshire. It returned one Member of Parliament (MP) to the House of Commons of the Parliament of the United Kingdom, elected by the first past the post system.

== History ==
The constituency was created when the two-member Eastern West Riding of Yorkshire was divided by the Redistribution of Seats Act 1885 for the 1885 general election. It was abolished for the 1918 general election.

== Boundaries ==
The Redistribution of Seats Act 1885 provided that the constituency should consist of

- the municipal borough of Pontefract,
- the wapentake of Osgoldcross,
- the Parishes in the Sessional Division of Upper Barkston Ash of Brotherton, Fairburn, Ledsham and Ledstone, and
- the Parishes in the Sessional Division of Skyrack of Allerton Bywater and Kippax.

== Members of Parliament ==
Election	Member	Party
1885	Sir John Ramsden, Bt	Independent Liberal
1886	Sir John Ramsden, Bt	Liberal Unionist
1886	Sir John Austin, Bt	Liberal
1899	Sir John Austin, Bt	Independent Liberal
1906	Sir Joseph Compton-Rickett	Liberal
1918	constituency abolished	

== Elections ==
=== Elections in the 1880s ===
General election 1885: Osgoldcross
Party	Candidate	Votes	%	±%
Liberal	John Ramsden	5,153	62.8	
Conservative	Reginald Hardy	3,053	37.2	
Majority		2,100	25.6	
Turnout		8,206	79.5	
Registered electors		10,322		
Liberal win (new seat)				

John Austin

General election 1886: Osgoldcross
Party	Candidate	Votes	%	±%
Liberal	John Austin	4,008	57.1	−5.7
Liberal Unionist	John Ramsden	3,010	42.9	+5.7
Majority		998	14.2	−11.4
Turnout		7,018	68.0	−11.5
Registered electors		10,322		
Liberal hold		Swing	−5.7	

=== Elections in the 1890s ===
General election 1892: Osgoldcross
Party	Candidate	Votes	%	±%
Liberal	John Austin	5,160	61.1	+4.0
Conservative	Charles Brook Dobson	3,284	38.9	−4.0
Majority		1,876	22.2	+8.0
Turnout		8,444	66.9	−1.1
Registered electors		12,615		
Liberal hold		Swing	+4.0	

General election 1895: Osgoldcross
Party	Candidate	Votes	%	±%
Liberal	John Austin	5,119	55.8	−5.3
Conservative	John Harling	4,054	44.2	+5.3
Majority		1,065	11.6	−10.6
Turnout		9,173	70.1	+3.2
Registered electors		13,083		
Liberal hold		Swing	-5.3	

Austin left the Liberal Party and sought re-election as an independent candidate.

Charles Roberts

1899 Osgoldcross by-election
Party	Candidate	Votes	%	±%
Independent Liberal	John Austin	5,818	66.8	+11.0
Liberal	Charles Henry Roberts	2,893	33.2	−22.6
Majority		2,925	33.6	N/A
Turnout		8,711	62.2	−7.9
Registered electors		14,009		
Independent Liberal gain from Liberal		Swing		

=== Elections in the 1900s ===
Rutherford

General election 1900: Osgoldcross
Party	Candidate	Votes	%	±%
Independent Liberal	John Austin	5,609	65.0	+9.2
Liberal	Vickerman Rutherford	3,025	35.0	−20.8
Majority		2,584	30.0	N/A
Turnout		8,634	58.8	−11.3
Registered electors		14,689		
Independent Liberal gain from Liberal		Swing		

Joseph Rickett

General election 1906: Osgoldcross
Party	Candidate	Votes	%	±%
Liberal	Joseph Compton-Rickett	8,482	66.1	+31.1
Conservative	Granville Wheler	4,358	33.9	New
Majority		4,124	32.2	N/A
Turnout		12,840	75.8	+17.0
Registered electors		16,935		
Liberal gain from Independent Liberal		Swing		

=== Elections in the 1910s ===
General election January 1910: Osgoldcross
Party	Candidate	Votes	%	±%
Liberal	Joseph Compton-Rickett	9,517	66.3	+0.2
Conservative	Gerald Hargreaves	4,840	33.7	−0.2
Majority		4,677	32.6	+0.4
Turnout		14,357	78.5	+2.7
Registered electors		18,286		
Liberal hold		Swing	+0.2	

General election December 1910: Osgoldcross
Party	Candidate	Votes	%	±%
Liberal	Joseph Compton-Rickett	8,518	66.2	−0.1
Conservative	Malcolm Campbell-Johnston	4,347	33.8	+0.1
Majority		4,171	32.4	−0.2
Turnout		12,865	70.4	−8.1
Registered electors		18,286		
Liberal hold		Swing	-0.1	

General Election 1914–15:

Another General Election was required to take place before the end of 1915. The political parties had been making preparations for an election to take place and by July 1914, the following candidates had been selected;

- Liberal: Joseph Compton-Rickett
- Unionist:
- Labour: John Potts

== See also ==
- Osgoldcross Rural District
