= John William Ramsden =

British Liberal Party politician

Sir John William Ramsden 5th Baronet
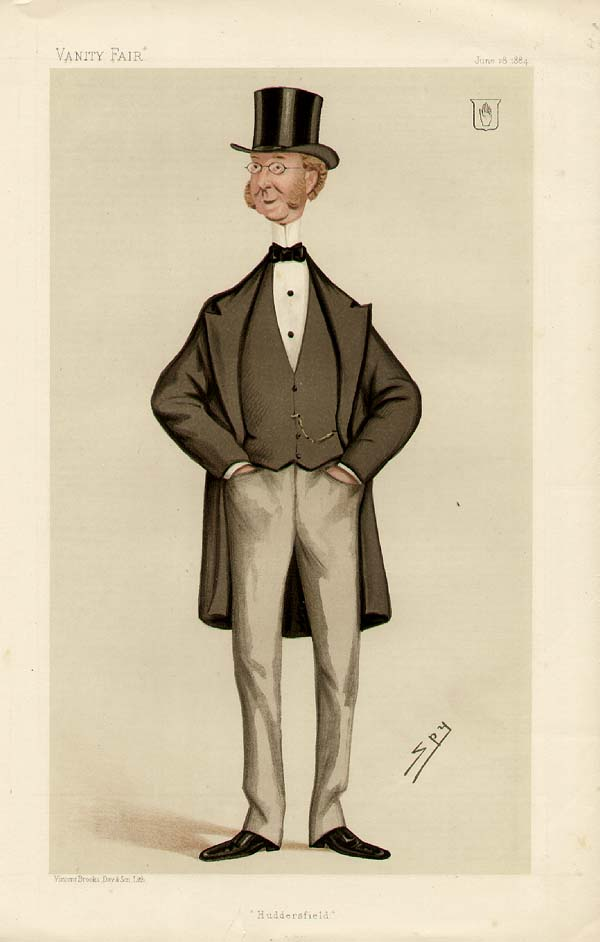
- Ramsden as caricatured by Spy (Leslie Ward) in Vanity Fair, June 1884
- Born: John William Ramsden; 14 September 1831
- Died: 15 April 1914 (aged 82)
- Other name: Huddersfield
- Occupations: Politician; High Sheriff of Yorkshire
- Organization: Liberal

Sir John William Ramsden, 5th Baronet (14 September 1831 – 15 April 1914) was a British Liberal Party politician.

== Biography ==
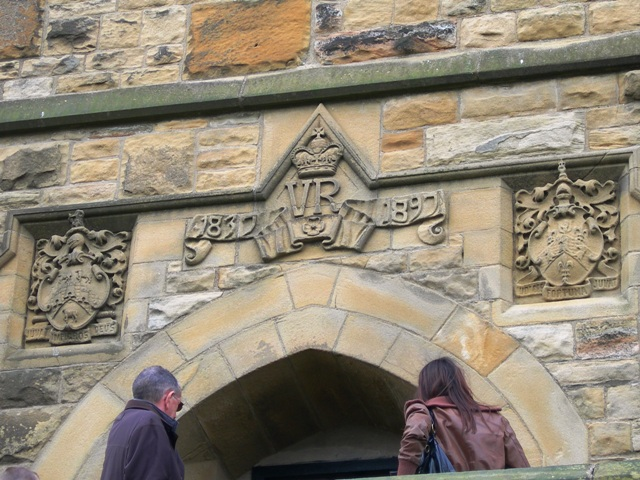
Arms of Sir John Ramsden, 5th Baronet (right) at Victoria Tower, Huddersfield, Yorkshire, built in 1897 to mark the Diamond Jubilee of Queen Victoria: Argent, on a Chevron between three Fleurs-de-lis Sable as many Rams' heads couped at the neck of the First, augmented with the canton of a baronet with the Arms of the Borough of Huddersfield (left), based on the arms of Ramsden, which family owned the manor from 1599 to 1920

Ramsden was born at Newby Park near Thirsk on 14 September 1831. His parents were John Charles Ramsden and his wife the Hon. Isabella Dundas, the daughter of Thomas Dundas, 1st Baron Dundas. Soon after his birth the family moved to Wharfedale where they owned Buckden House and its estate.

On 2 August 1865 he married Lady Helen Guendolen Seymour, daughter and co-heiress of Edward Adolphus Seymour, 12th Duke of Somerset, thus acquiring the Bulstrode estate near Gerrards Cross in Buckinghamshire. They had four children: Guendolen Isabella Jane, Hermione Charlotte (1867-1951), Rosamund Isabel (1872-1911) and Sir John Frecheville Ramsden, who succeeded to the baronetcy.

== Politics ==
He was elected as Member of Parliament (MP) for Hythe in 1857 and served as Under-Secretary of State for War from 1857 to 1858. Ramsden resigned from Parliament by taking appointment as Steward of the Chiltern Hundreds on 9 February 1859. He also sat as MP for Taunton from 1853 to 1857, for the West Riding of Yorkshire from 1859 to 1865, for Monmouth from 1868 to 1874, for the Eastern West Riding of Yorkshire from 1880 to 1885, and finally for Osgoldcross from 1885 to 1886.

He stood unsuccessfully as the Liberal Unionist candidate for Osgoldcross in 1886.

== Business ==
Ramsden was lord of the manor of Huddersfield, and, through the Ramsden Estate, owner of a large proportion of the town as well as a total of 11,248 acres of the West Riding. In addition he acquired in the 1870s a 138,000 acre deer forest at Ardverikie, Laggan, Inverness-shire (where he built Ardverikie House), and 800 acres of Lincolnshire.

In the 1850s Ramsden's brother-in-law, Edward Horsman developed the Penang Sugar Estates in Malaysia's Province Wellesley. Horsman was an absentee landowner and his enterprise was not successful, but Ramsden provided financial backing for a number of years. Ramsden paid off the creditors when Horsman became bankrupt in 1874 and as part of the final settlement he took title of the estates. Like Horsman, Ramsden never visited Malaya but he did develop the estates there and he established Penang Rubber Estates in a shift to growing rubber instead of sugar. By the mid 1880s Ramsden's Malayan business was generating more income than his business interests in Huddersfield. When he died Ramsden owned more than 44,000 acres of cultivated plantation land in Malaya.

He served as High Sheriff of Yorkshire in 1868/69.

== University of Huddersfield ==
In 1825 there was an attempt to set up a Scientific and Mechanics Institution in Huddersfield. Supported by a group of donors, Sir John William Ramsden later agreed to become its Patron. Its aims were to instruct local mechanics and tradesmen in scientific principles relating to their work, through lectures and a circulation library. It later became part of the Huddersfield Philosophical Society. Subsequent educational initiatives in Huddersfield included the Young Men's Mental Improvement Society, the Huddersfield Mechanics' Institution, and the Technical School. The Technical School and Mechanics' Institute merged to become the Technical College, which subsequently became the College of Technology, then Huddersfield Polytechnic, before being granted University status as the University of Huddersfield in 1992.

The Ramsden Building, named after Sir John William Ramsden, was opened in 1883 by the Huddersfield Technical School and Mechanics' Institute and is situated on Queen Street South, between Milton Church and St Paul's Church, and is now part of the University of Huddersfield campus.

== See also ==
- Ramsden baronets

Parliament of the United Kingdom
Preceded by Henry Labouchere; Arthur Mills	Member of Parliament for Taunton; 1853–1857; With: Henry Labouchere	Succeeded by Henry Labouchere; Arthur Mills
Preceded by Edward Drake Brockman	Member of Parliament for Hythe; 1857–1859	Succeeded by Mayer Amschel de Rothschild
Preceded by Edmund Beckett Denison; Viscount Goderich	Member of Parliament for West Riding of Yorkshire; 1859–1865; With: Edmund Beckett Denison March 1859 – May 1859; Sir Francis Crossley, Bt May 1859 – 1865	Constituency divided
Preceded by Crawshay Bailey	Member of Parliament for Monmouth Boroughs; 1868–1874	Succeeded by Thomas Cordes
Preceded by Christopher Beckett Denison; Joshua Fielden	Member of Parliament for Eastern West Riding of Yorkshire; 1880–1885; With: Andrew Fairbairn	Constituency abolished
New constituency	Member of Parliament for Osgoldcross; 1885–1886	Succeeded by John Austin
Political offices
Preceded by Frederick Peel	Under-Secretary of State for War; 1857–1858	Succeeded by The Viscount Hardinge
Baronetage of England
Preceded by John Ramsden	Baronet (of Byram); 1839–1914	Succeeded by John Frecheville Ramsden
