= Bulstrode Park =

Park and mansion in Buckinghamshire, England

Coordinates: 51.58676°N 0.57966°W

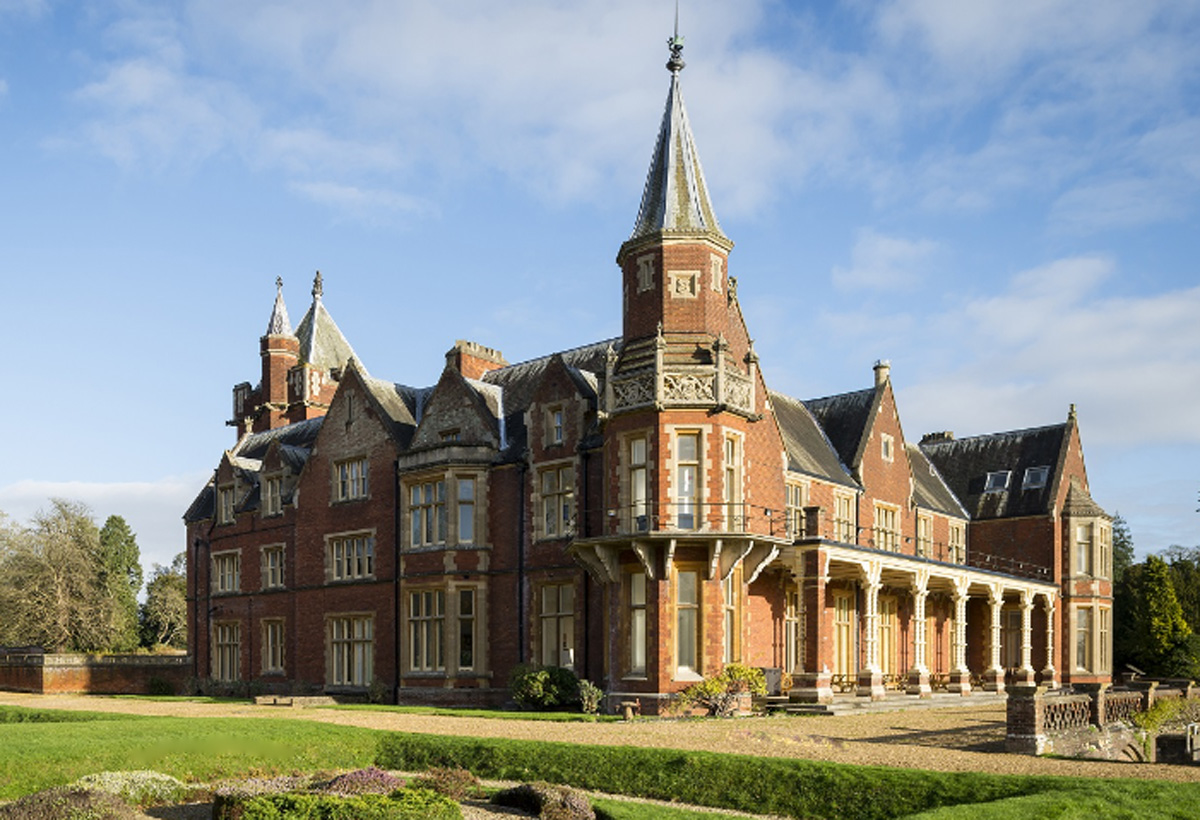
Bulstrode Park mansion

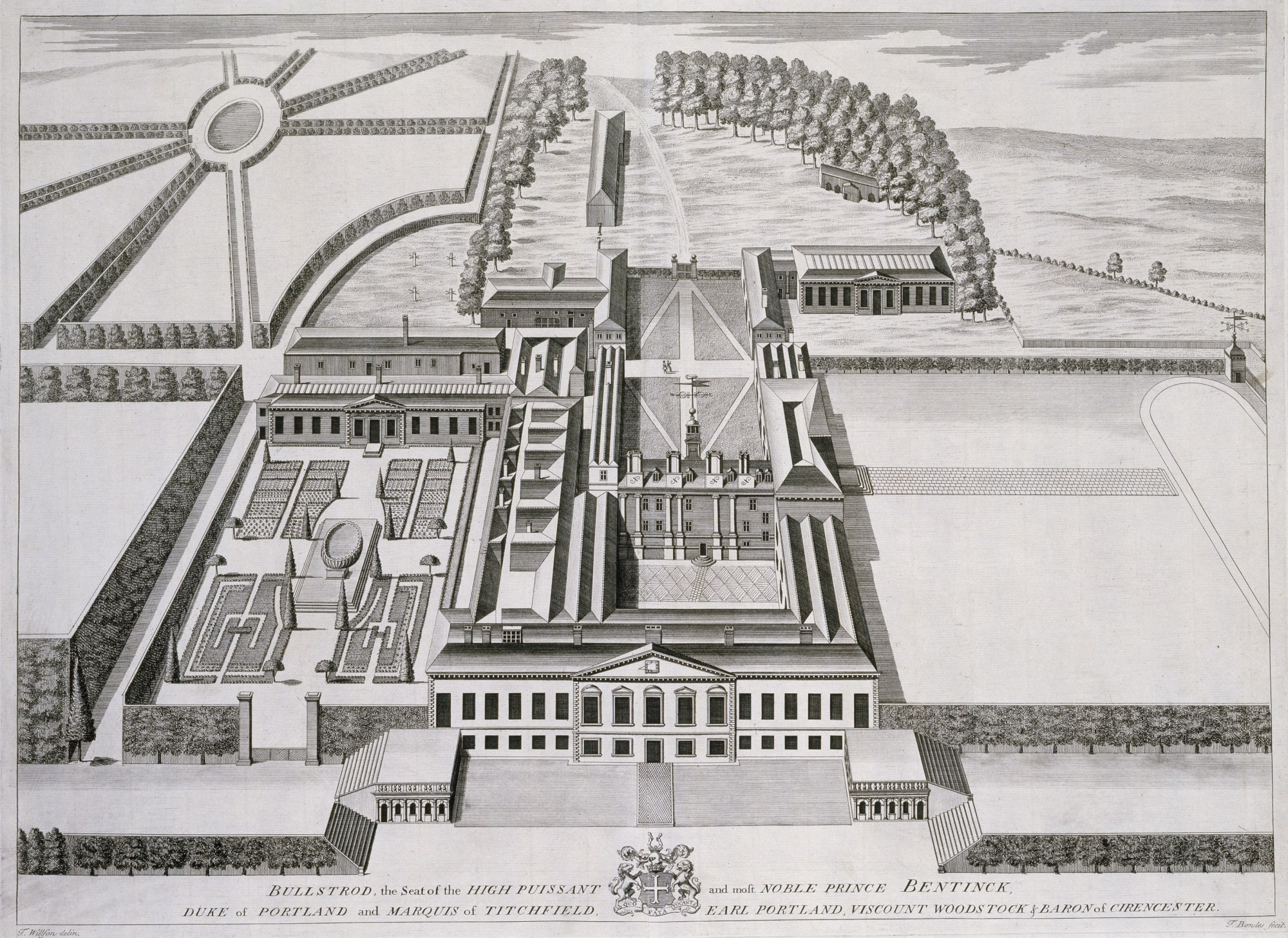
Bulstrode around 1739 in the Vitruvius Brittanicus

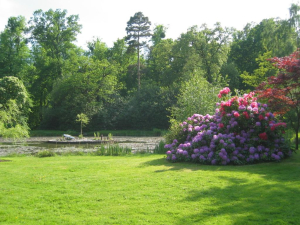
Bulstrode grounds

Bulstrode is an English country house and its large park, located to the southwest of Gerrards Cross, Buckinghamshire. The estate spreads across Chalfont St Peter, Gerrards Cross and Fulmer, and predates the Norman conquest. Its name may originate from the Anglo-Saxon words burh (fort) and stród (marsh). The park and garden are designated a Grade II* listed park and garden.

== First house ==
The original house was built for the infamous Judge Jeffreys in 1686. It was sold to Hans William Bentinck, 1st Earl of Portland, who made it one of his principal residences and died there in 1709. In the 1740s, the architect and builder Stiff Leadbetter altered the house significantly for the 2nd Duke of Portland. The 3rd Duke commissioned further re-modellings and additions, including the castellated West Wing, to the designs of James Wyatt, between 1806 and 1809.

Margaret Bentinck, the wife of the 2nd Duke used the house to accommodate her natural history and antiquities collection, with the south-west side of the park used for live specimens (called Menagerie Wood today). The botanists Joseph Banks and Daniel Solander donated many exotic plants to the Dowager to help her develop the gardens at Bulstrode, which became the inspiration for Mrs Mary Delany's floral "paper mosaicks" now held in the British Museum Library which were greatly admired by Queen Charlotte.

Their son, the 3rd Duke was a collector of marble and glass, and was influential in loaning the Roman Portland Vase to Josiah Wedgwood. After the 4th Duke of Portland inherited the title in 1809, he decided to dispose of Bulstrode and Edward St Maur, 11th Duke of Somerset then acquired the house in 1811.

== Present house ==
Edward Seymour, 12th Duke of Somerset commissioned the present 83,000 sq ft (7,700 m^{2}) mansion, which was completed in 1865. After his death, it passed to his daughter, Lady Helen Guendolen Ramsden (née Seymour) then to her son, Sir John Frecheville Ramsden.

The house was unoccupied until the Second World War, when it was used for training as the RAF Staff College.

Following the War, Frecheville Ramsden used part of the property for chemical research into sisal by-products. After Frecheville Ramsden's death in 1958, the park was sold to a farmer, and the mansion and woodland were bought by the Bruderhof community.

In 1966, the Bruderhof moved to the United States, and the property was bought by WEC International, a Christian evangelical mission agency, who gradually restored and improved the public parts of the house's interior. WEC International sold the mansion to a private owner in 2016 for £13 million. It was sold again in 2023 for just £6 million.

== Bulstrode Street ==
Bulstrode Street in London's Marylebone district was named after Bulstrode Park.
