= Pennington Lake =

Lake in the state of Minnesota, United States

- Location within Minnesota
- Location: Kanabec County, Minnesota
- Coordinates: 45°46′51″N 93°16′20″W
- Type: lake

Pennington Lake is a lake in Kanabec County, in the U.S. state of Minnesota.

Pennington Lake was named for James Pennington, a pioneer farmer.

== See also ==
- List of lakes in Minnesota
