= Donald Pennington =

British psychologist and academic

Donald C. Pennington is a British psychologist and was pro-vice-chancellor of Coventry University. He is the author of a number of psychology textbooks.
