= James Ramsden =

James Ramsden may refer to:

- Sir James Ramsden (industrialist) (1822–1896), British industrialist and former Barrow-in-Furness civic leader
- James Ramsden (politician) (1923–2020), British Member of Parliament
