= John Pennington, 1st Baron Muncaster =

British peer and Tory politician

John Pennington, 1st Baron Muncaster (c. 1740 – 8 October 1813), known as John Pennington until 1783, was a British peer and Tory politician.

== Background ==
Muncaster was the eldest son of Sir Joseph Pennington, 4th Baronet, of Muncaster Castle, Cumberland, and Sarah, daughter of John Moore.

== Political career ==
Muncaster was returned to Parliament as one of two representatives for Milborne Port in 1781, a seat he held until 1796, and then sat for Colchester until 1802. In 1806, he was returned for Westmoreland, and sat for the county until he died in 1813. In 1783, ten years before he succeeded his father in the baronetcy, he was elevated to the Peerage of Ireland as Baron Muncaster, with remainder in default of male issue of his own to his younger brother Lowther Pennington and the heirs male of his body.

== Family ==
Lord Muncaster married Penelope, daughter of James Compton, in 1778. She died in November 1806. Muncaster survived her by seven years and died in October 1813. He had no sons and was succeeded in the baronetcy and barony (in the barony according to the special remainder) by his younger brother, Lowther.

Parliament of Great Britain
Preceded by Thomas Hutchings-Medlycott; John Townson	Member of Parliament for Milborne Port; 1781–1796; With: John Townson 1781–1787; William Popham 1787–1790; William Medlycott 1790–1791; Richard Johnson 1791–1794; Mark Wood 1794–1796	Succeeded by Lord Paget; Sir Robert Ainslie
Preceded by Robert Thornton; George Jackson	Member of Parliament for Colchester; 1796–1801; With: Robert Thornton	Parliament of the United Kingdom
Parliament of the United Kingdom
Preceded by Parliament of Great Britain	Member of Parliament for Colchester; 1801–1802; With: Robert Thornton	Succeeded by Robert Thornton; John Denison
Preceded by Sir Michael le Fleming; James Lowther	Member of Parliament for Westmoreland; 1806–1813; With: James Lowther 1806–1812; Henry Lowther 1812–1813	Succeeded by Henry Lowther; Viscount Lowther
Baronetage of England
Preceded by Joseph Pennington	Baronet (of Muncaster); 1793–1813	Succeeded by Lowther Pennington
Peerage of Ireland
New creation	Baron Muncaster; 1783–1813	Succeeded by Lowther Pennington
