= Ramsden Estate (Huddersfield) =

Property holding associated with the manor of Huddersfield, England

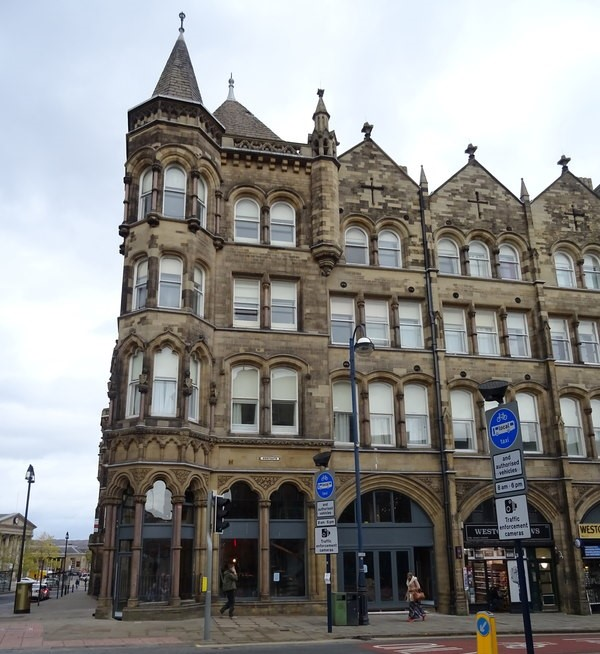
Estate Buildings, the offices from which the estate was at one time managed

The Ramsden Estate is a property holding associated with the manor of Huddersfield, in the English county of Yorkshire, since the 16th century. It was in the possession of the Ramsden family, latterly holders of the Pennington-Ramsden Baronetcy, until 1920, when it was sold to Huddersfield Corporation. At the time of the purchase, the estate comprised the whole of the town centre, together with nearly half the land within the county borough boundary, a total of more than 4,300 acres (1,700 ha). The purchase came at a price was £1.3 million, required its own act of parliament and earned Huddersfield the reputation of "the town that bought itself".

== History ==
=== Under family ownership ===
In the early 16th century, the Ramsdens were a family of yeoman farmers and clothiers living in the Scammonden area. The first reference to them in the context of Huddersfield was when William Ramsden married Joanna, the daughter of John Wood of Longley in 1531. One of William's descendants, also named William Ramsden, bought the manor of Huddersfield from Queen Elizabeth I in 1599 for £965-0-9. His son, Sir John Ramsden, added the nearby manor of Almondbury in 1627. Another Sir John Ramsden, the first of the Ramsden baronets, was an ardent Royalist and was rewarded by King Charles II with a market charter for Huddersfield in 1671.

The market charter proved important for the development of Huddersfield as a centre of the textile industry, but for many years the town's cloth merchants were forced to sell their goods in the local churchyard. In 1766, Sir John Ramsden, 3rd Baronet remedied this by the construction of Huddersfield Cloth Hall, which confirmed the town's status as a mercantile centre. His son, Sir John Ramsden, 4th Baronet, built the Huddersfield Broad Canal, at a personal expense of £12,000, to connect the town to the River Calder and provide a link to the outside world more economic than the pack animals that had been used up until then.

Sir John William Ramsden, 5th Baronet was best known for his plans to develop Huddersfield town centre. The railway had reached the town in 1847 with the construction of Huddersfield railway station, situated rather to the north of the town's established town centre, and he planned to develop the surrounding area. The rather grand St George's Square was part of this, as was the creation of John William Street (named after its creator) to link the new square to the long-established Market Place to the south. The estate maintained control over what was built on its land, employing Sir William Tite to scrutinise the plans. It also constructed several buildings itself, including a hotel, offices and a shopping arcade.

The Ramsden Estate had already built a hotel in 1726, known as the George Inn and located on the north side of the Market Place, and rebuilt it in 1787. However the new street required the demolition of this building. As a replacement, the new George Hotel was built in 1848–50 next to the station, the two buildings forming two sides of St George's Square. Further buildings were added to the square during the 1850s, including Lion Buildings, Britannia Buildings and 7, St George's Square. Elsewhere in the area, the estate also built the Estate Buildings, which included their own offices, and the Byram Arcade, named after the village of Byram, where the Ramsden family had a home. All of these buildings are now listed.

=== The purchase ===
By the first years of the 20th century, the Ramsden family found themselves with serious debts. One account suggests that they owed £800,000 to their bankers. Another recounts an approach made to a town councillor by a member of the Rothschild family, during a trade mission to Austria as early as 1894, suggesting the council might buy the estate. However this was not proceeded with.

Huddersfield Corporation (Lands) Act 1920
- Act of Parliament
- Parliament of the United Kingdom
- Long title: An Act to enable the Mayor, Aldermen, and Burgesses of the Borough of Huddersfield to purchase the Ramsden Estate, in the borough and adjoining parish of Honley, and to enlarge the powers of the Mayor, Aldermen, and Burgesses in relation to the acquisition of lands and buildings, and for other purposes.
- Citation: 10 & 11 Geo. 5. c. lxxiii

Dates
- Royal assent: 4 August 1920

Other legislation
- Repealed by: West Yorkshire Act 1980

Status: Repealed

In 1917, Huddersfield Corporation was again approached with an offer to sell the estate to the council. To proceed with this offer, the corporation had to obtain a special lands bill to allow it to raise the necessary funds and proceed with the purchase. The bill eventually passed both Houses, becoming the Huddersfield Corporation (Lands) Act 1920 (10 & 11 Geo. 5. c. lxxiii) and, on 29 September 1920, the Ramsden Estate became the property of the corporation.
