= Josslyn Pennington, 5th Baron Muncaster =

British soldier and politician (1834–1917)

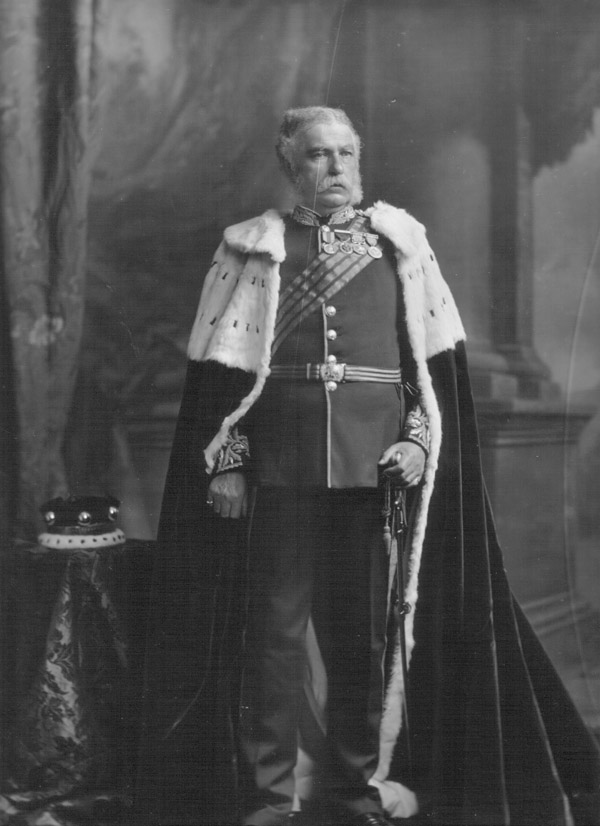
5th Baron Muncaster, photographed on 9 December 1902.

Josslyn Francis Pennington, 5th Baron Muncaster, DL, JP (25 December 1834 – 30 March 1917) was a British soldier and Conservative Party politician.

== Biography ==
Muncaster was the third son of Lowther Augustus John Pennington, 3rd Baron Muncaster, and his wife Frances Catherine, daughter of Sir John Ramsden, 4th Baronet. On 21 January 1853, he purchased an ensigncy in the 90th Regiment of Foot. He was a captain in the Rifle Brigade and fought in the Crimean War. He was appointed a deputy lieutenant of the East Riding of Yorkshire on 1 November 1860, and 8 August 1868 he raised the 11th (Pocklington) Yorkshire (East Riding) Rifle Volunteer Corps.

In 1862 he succeeded his elder brother in the barony. As this was an Irish peerage it did not entitle him to an automatic seat in the House of Lords. Muncaster was instead elected to the House of Commons for Cumberland West in 1872, a seat he held until 1880, and later represented Egremont from 1885 to 1892. He was also a Deputy Lieutenant and Justice of the Peace for Cumberland and served as Lord-Lieutenant of Cumberland between 1876 and 1917. In 1898 he was created Baron Muncaster, of Muncaster in the County of Cumberland, in the Peerage of the United Kingdom, which gave him a seat in the House of Lords.

In 1870, he, his wife, and the rest of their travelling party were captured by bandits near Oropos. Lord and Lady Muncaster were freed to carry the demand for ransom; the Greek government sent troops to assault the bandits, who killed the other hostages before being overwhelmed. These events became known as the Dilessi murders.

On 22 November 1871, he was appointed a deputy lieutenant of Cumberland.

Part of his estate at Gillbrow near Lindal was leased to Harrison Ainslie by the 4th Baronet. The remainder of the ore bearing ground was leased to Parkside Mining Company in 1878.

Lord Muncaster died in March 1917, aged 82, and all his titles became extinct.

== Family ==
Lord Muncaster married Constance (b. 1839), daughter of Edmund L'Estrange, in 1863. They had no children. Lady Muncaster survived her husband by only four months and died in July 1917.

== Legacy ==
St James' Church, Warter was built for Muncaster in 1862–1863.

== Notes ==
Parliament of the United Kingdom
Preceded by Henry Lowther; Percy Wyndham	Member of Parliament for Cumberland West; 1872–1880; With: Percy Wyndham	Succeeded by Percy Wyndham; David Ainsworth
New seat	Member of Parliament for Egremont; 1885–1892	Succeeded by David Ainsworth
Honorary titles
Preceded by The Earl of Lonsdale	Lord-Lieutenant of Cumberland; 1876–1917	Succeeded by The Earl of Lonsdale
Peerage of Ireland
Preceded by Gamel Pennington	Baron Muncaster; 1862–1917	Extinct
Peerage of the United Kingdom
New creation	Baron Muncaster; 1898–1917	Extinct
