= Jimmy Pennington =

English footballer

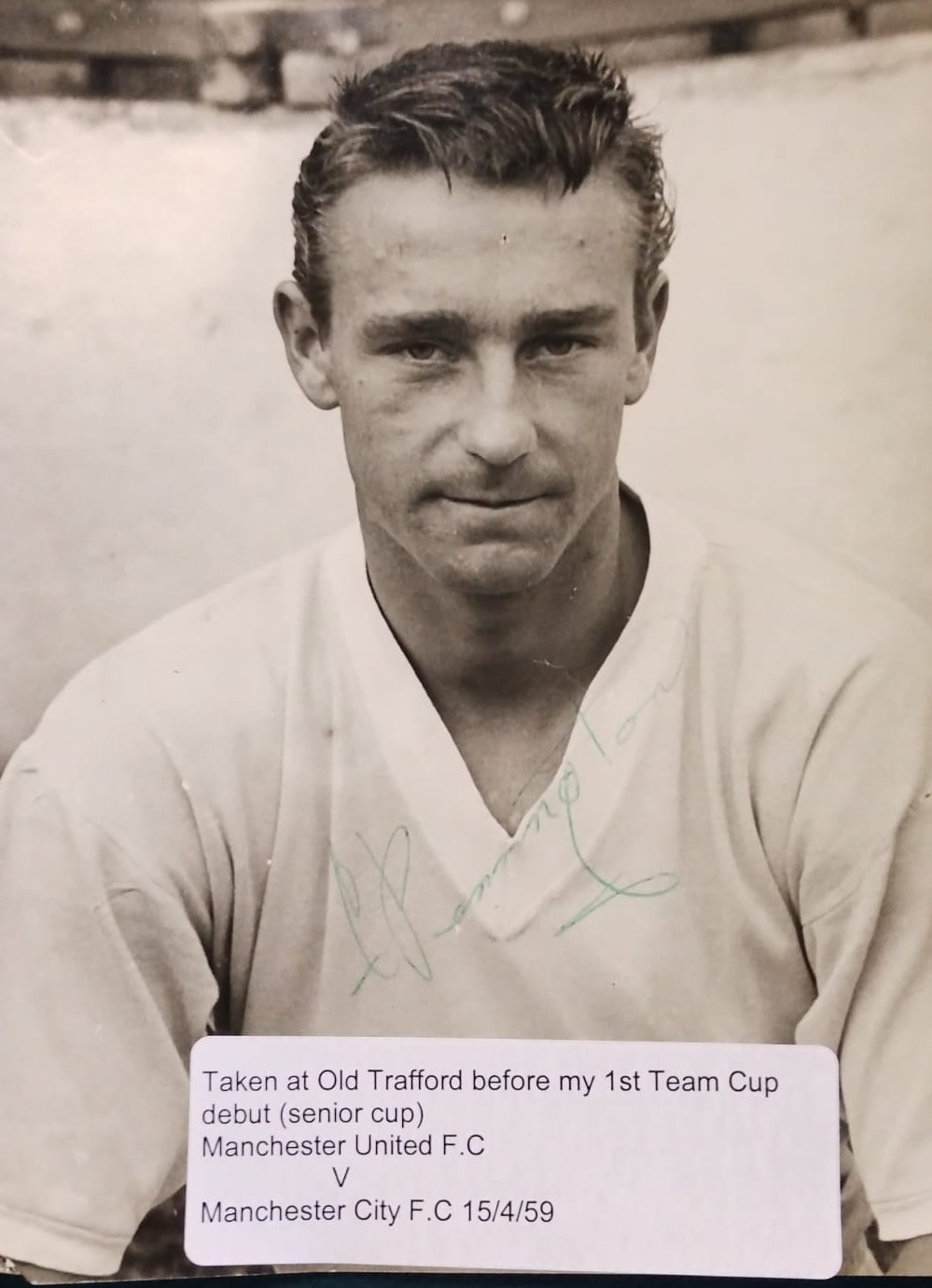

Personal information
- Full name: James Pennington
- Date of birth: 26 April 1939 (age 87)
- Place of birth: Golborne, England
- Position: Right winger

Senior career*
Years	Team	Apps	(Gls)
1958–1959	Manchester City	1	(0)
1960–1963	Crewe Alexandra	34	(2)
1963–1965	Grimsby Town	89	(8)
1965–1966	Oldham Athletic	23	(0)
1966–1967	Rochdale	14	(0)
1967–1968	Northwich Victoria	?	(?)
Total		161	(10)
- * Club domestic league appearances and goals

James Pennington (born 26 April 1939 in Golborne, Lancashire), is an English former footballer who played as a right winger in the Football League.
