= Baron Muncaster =

Extinct barony in the Peerage of the United Kingdom

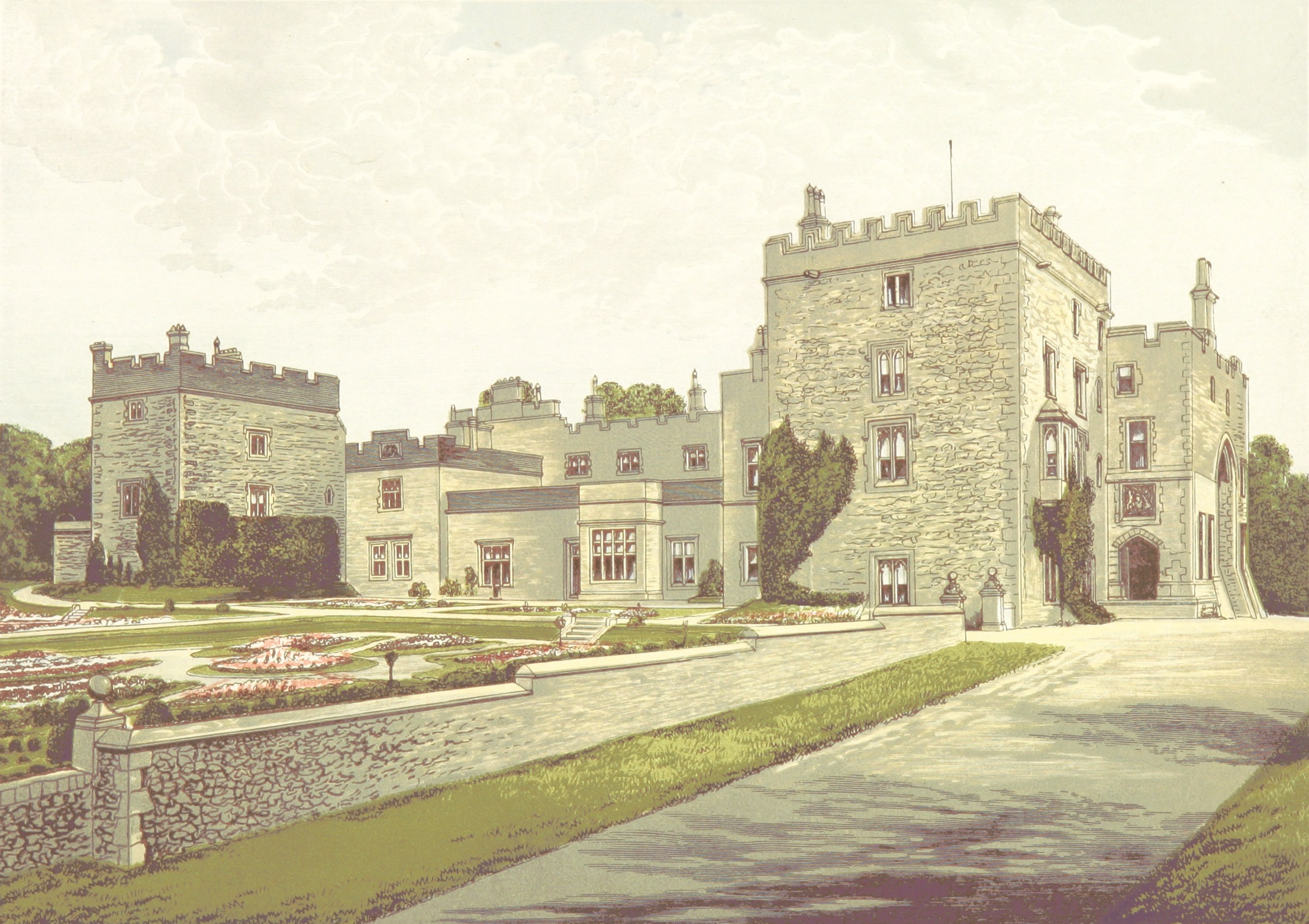
Muncaster Castle circa 1880; the ancestral seat of the Pennington family

Baron Muncaster was a title in the Peerage of Ireland and in the Peerage of the United Kingdom held by the Pennington family. This family, of Muncaster Castle in Cumberland, descended from William Pennington, who was created a Baronet, of Muncaster in the County of Cumberland, in the Baronetage of England in 1676. He was succeeded by his son, the second Baronet. He represented Cumberland in the House of Commons. His son, the third Baronet, also sat as Member of Parliament for this constituency. He died childless and was succeeded by his younger brother, the fourth Baronet. On his death the title passed to his son, the fifth Baronet. He was Member of Parliament for Milborne Port and Colchester. In 1783, ten years before he succeeded his father in the baronetcy, he was raised to the Peerage of Ireland as Baron Muncaster, with remainder in default of male issue of his own to his younger brother Lowther Pennington and the heirs male of his body.

Lord Muncaster died without male issue and was succeeded (in the barony according to the special remainder) by his younger brother, the second Baron. The titles descended from father to son until the early death of his grandson, the fourth Baron, in 1862. He had no sons and was succeeded by his younger brother, the fifth Baron. He represented Cumberland West and Egremont in the House of Commons and served as Lord-Lieutenant of Cumberland. On 11 June 1898 he was created Baron Muncaster, of Muncaster in the County of Cumberland, in the Peerage of the United Kingdom, which entitled him to an automatic seat in the House of Lords. However, Lord Muncaster was childless and on his death in 1917 all his titles became extinct.

== Pennington Baronets, of Muncaster (1676) ==
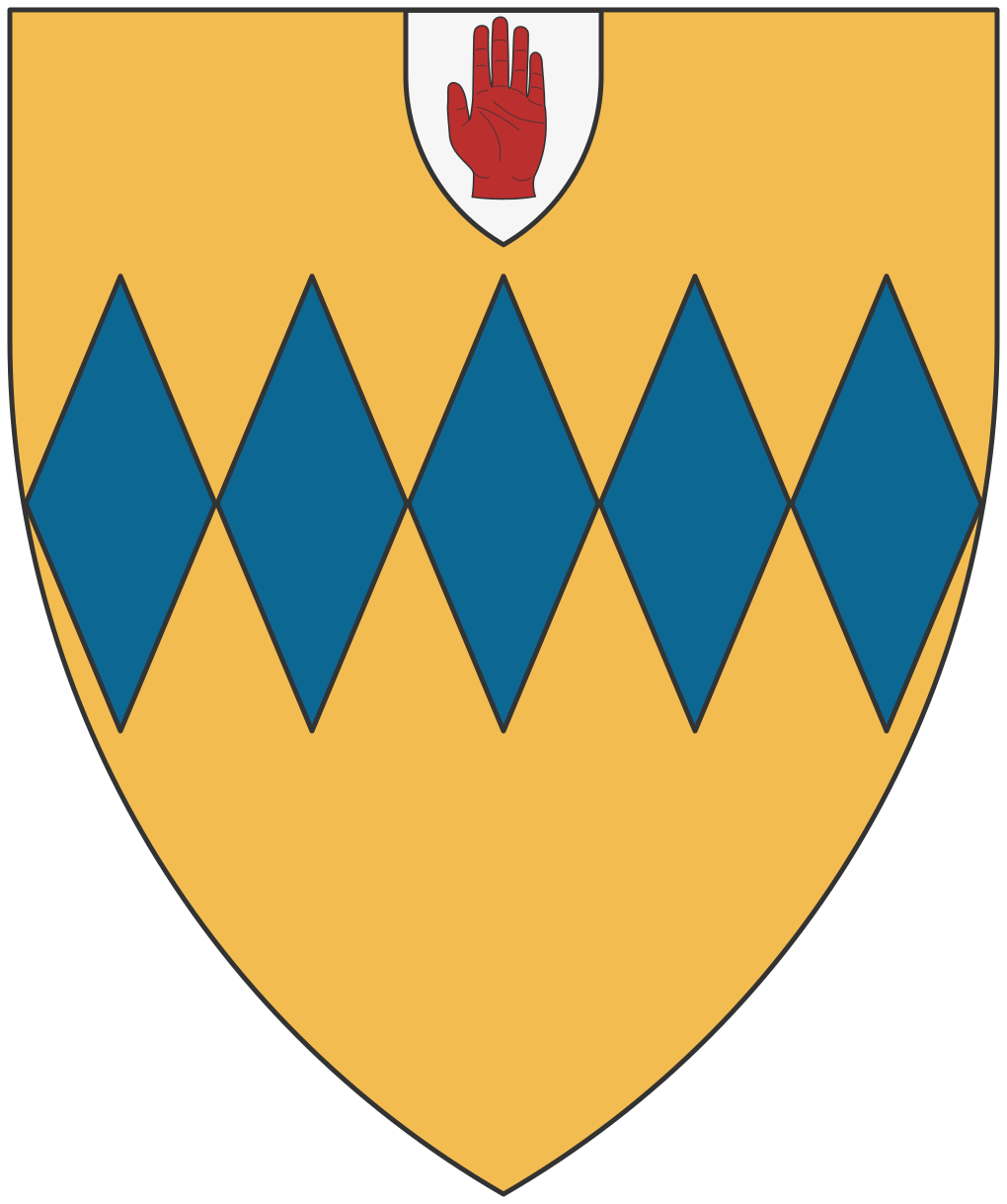
The coat of arms of the Pennington baronets.

- Sir William Pennington, 1st Baronet (1655–1730)
- Sir Joseph Pennington, 2nd Baronet (1677–1744)
- Sir John Pennington, 3rd Baronet (c. 1710–1768)
- Sir Joseph Pennington, 4th Baronet (1718–1793)
- John Pennington, 1st Baron Muncaster, 5th Baronet (c. 1740–1813) (had already been created Baron Muncaster in 1783)

== Barons Muncaster (1783) ==
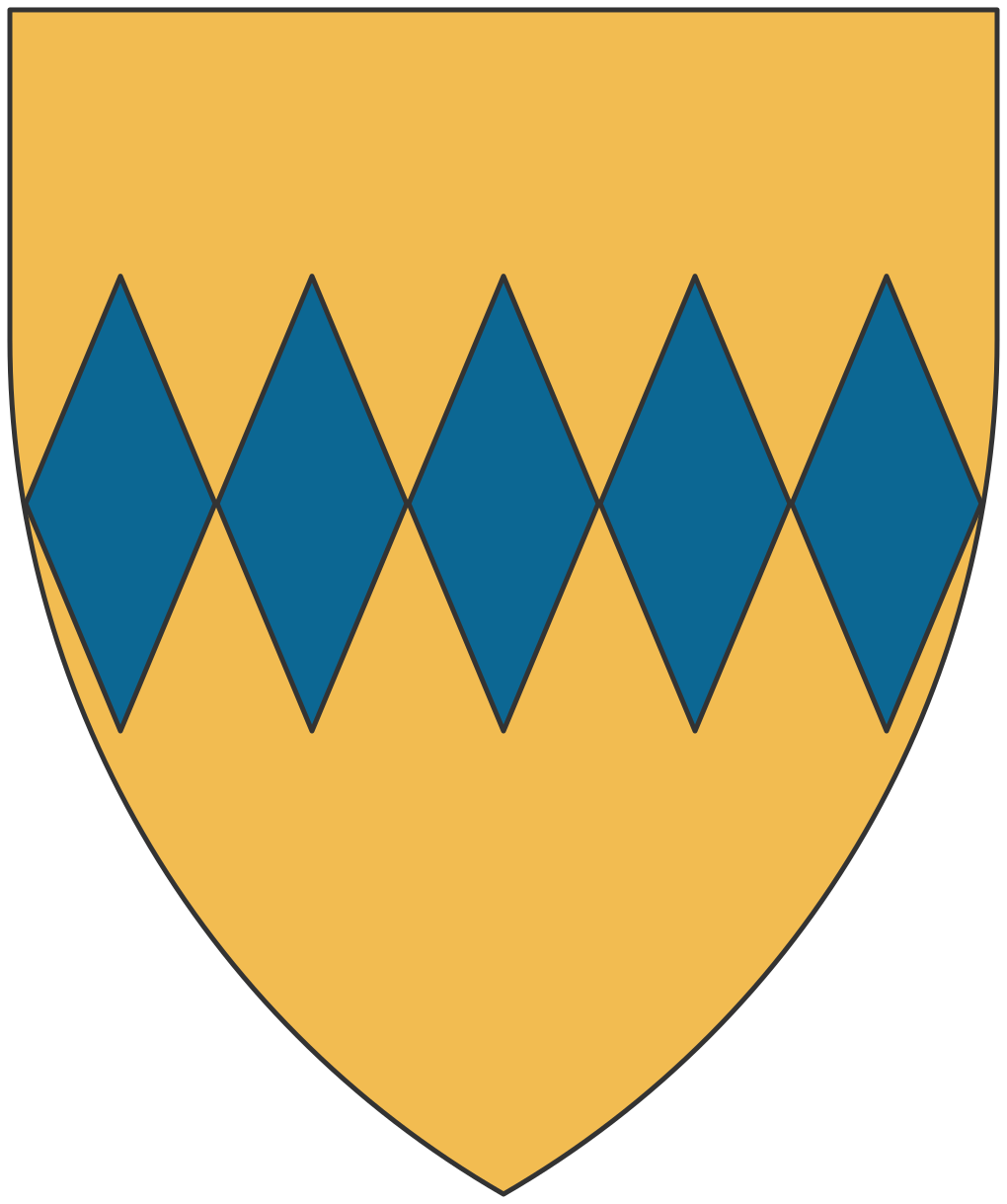
The coat of arms of the Pennington, baronets.

- John Pennington, 1st Baron Muncaster (c. 1740–1813)
- Lowther Pennington, 2nd Baron Muncaster (1745–1818)
- Lowther Augustus John Pennington, 3rd Baron Muncaster (1802–1838)
- Gamel Augustus Pennington, 4th Baron Muncaster (1831–1862)
- Josslyn Francis Pennington, 5th Baron Muncaster (1834–1917) (created Baron Muncaster in the Peerage of the United Kingdom in 1898)
