= Lowther Pennington, 2nd Baron Muncaster =

General Lowther Pennington, 2nd Baron Muncaster (1745 – 29 July 1818) was a British Army general who saw active service during the American Revolution and the French Revolutionary Wars. Pennington seems to have been frequently at odds with his fellow officers: his arrival in America was signaled by a duel with the Royal Navy captain who brought him over, and in 1793, he was publicly reprimanded by the Duke of York for court-martialing an adjutant over a trifle. After thirty years of service in the Coldstream Guards, he received the colonelcy of the 131st Regiment of Foot in 1795, only for it to be disbanded the next year. He married late in life, in 1802, and promptly had one son. His last command was a Royal Veteran Battalion in 1806, which he resigned in 1813 upon inheriting his brother's barony and estates, dying five years later.

== Early life ==
Pennington was the third son of Sir Joseph Pennington, 4th Baronet, and his wife Sarah. The Penningtons were an old Cumberland family, seated at Muncaster Castle since 1208. He was commissioned an ensign in the Coldstream Guards on 4 November 1764, and would serve with the regiment for the next thirty years. He was promoted lieutenant on 20 October 1772.

== American Revolution ==
Pennington was ordered to join the Guards detachment serving in America in July 1777. His friend Sir Willoughby Aston, 6th Baronet, recommended that he take passage to New York City aboard HMS Zebra; Zebra's new captain, Hon. John Tollemache, had married Aston's sister-in-law. The experience proved unfortunate. Tollemache and Pennington fell out during the voyage, to a degree that provoked a duel.

The duel was fought on the night of their arrival, at Hull's Tavern. Contemporary journals, the New-York Gazette and Rivington's Gazette, reported that Tollemache was killed by a single thrust through the breast, while Pennington sustained multiple wounds. A contemporary letter by Horace Walpole, presumably reflecting the report of the time, attributes the quarrel to "humming a tune". Pennington was brought before a general court-martial in Philadelphia on 15 December to be tried for murder in Tollemache's death. Aston, Pennington, and his fellow-passenger Capt. Primrose Kennedy all testified that Tollemache had verbally abused Pennington during the voyage, and expressed a desire to kill him in a duel. Pennington's absent-minded humming after dinner was said by Kennedy to have produced a particular outburst from Tollemache. The court-martial acquitted Pennington of murder. Later accounts of the event became more fanciful, relating that Pennington and Tollemache exchanged fire with a brace of pistols before resorting to smallswords, and attributing the quarrel to a sonnet made by Pennington on Tollemache's wife; these embellishments do not appear to be supported by contemporary accounts.

Pennington was promoted to captain of a company in the Guards, succeeding Wadham Wyndham, on 14 December 1778. He sat on the board of enquiry investigating the Battle of Paulus Hook. At the Battle of Young's House on 8 February 1780, Pennington brought up a party of grenadiers to reinforce the troops engaged, following which Young's house was successfully stormed.

During the Guards' campaign in the south, Pennington commanded the grenadier company of the 1st Battalion. He was given leave by Cornwallis to go from Suffolk, Virginia to New York on 16 July 1781. He thereby escaped the capitulation at Yorktown. He brought with him a servant named Abraham, formerly a slave owned by Peter Rose. Pennington returned from America in November 1781.

== French Revolutionary Wars ==
He was promoted to second major of the Coldstream Guards on 1 February 1793. He commanded the 1st Battalion of the Coldstream Guards during the Flanders Campaign. At the Battle of Raismes on 8 May 1793, he led the battalion against La Marlière's division, driving them from the forest of Vicoigne and back to their entrenchments. However, his attempt to storm that position was repelled with heavy losses. Pennington displayed an irascible temper throughout the campaign, which steadily worsened and markedly impaired his relations with the other Guards officers. During the Siege of Valenciennes, matters came to a head when he requested the court-martial of Captain Wynyard of the Coldstream Guards, an equerry to the Duke of York, over a triviality. The Duke let the court-martial proceed, to avoid accusations of favoritism; Wynyard was honourably acquitted, and the Duke, who thought Pennington "perfectly mad", excoriated him before the other officers afterward. Nonetheless, he was favourably recognized by the Duke, together with the other Guards commanders, for his gallantry in leading the Coldstream Guards at the Battle of Lincelles the following month. On 20 December 1793, he was promoted to the rank of major-general.

On 1 April 1795, he was promoted to first major of the Coldstream Guards. On 23 June 1795, he was appointed colonel of the 131st Regiment of Foot. The regiment was disbanded in 1796, and Pennington went on half-pay.

== Later life and family ==
On 29 June 1799, Pennington was promoted to lieutenant-general. On 13 January 1802, he married Esther, the widow of Capt. James Morrison and daughter of Thomas Barry. They had one child, Lowther Augustus John Pennington (1802–1838).

In 1806, he was appointed colonel of the 10th Royal Veteran Battalion, raised to provide garrison troops in Canada, and on 25 April 1808, he was promoted to general. In 1813, he succeeded his elder brother as Baron Muncaster by special remainder, and to the family estates in Cumberland and Yorkshire, subsequently resigning his colonelcy. He died in 1818 in his house at Grosvenor Place, and was succeeded by his only son, Lowther.

== Bibliography ==
- Aspinall, Arthur, ed. (1963). The Later Correspondence of George III. Vol. II. Cambridge: Cambridge University Press.
- Brown, Henry J., ed. (1906). Report on American Manuscripts in the Royal Institution of Great Britain. Vol. II. Dublin: John Falconer.
- Farrier, George H., ed. (1879). Memorial of the Centennial Celebration of the Battle of Paulus Hook. Jersey City: M. Mullone. p. 61.
- Fortescue, Sir John William (1918). British Campaigns in Flanders, 1690-1794. London: Macmillan & Co. p. 211.
- Hunt, William H., ed. (1907). The Registers of St. Paul's Church, Covent Garden, London. Vol. III. London: The Harleian Society.
- Mackinnon, Daniel (1833). Origin and Services of the Coldstream Guards. Vol. II. London: Richard Bentley.
- Pearse, Hugh (1908). Memoir of the life and military services of Viscount Lake. Edinburgh & London: William Blackwood and Sons. p. 79.

Military offices
Preceded by Henry Edward Fox	Colonel of the 131st Regiment of Foot; 1795–1796	Regiment disbanded
New regiment	Colonel of the 10th Royal Veteran Battalion; 1806–1813	Succeeded by Donald Macpherson
Parliament of Ireland
Preceded by John Pennington	Baron Muncaster; 1813–1818	Succeeded by Lowther Pennington
