= Ramsden baronets =

Extinct baronetcy in the Baronetage of the United Kingdom

There have been two baronetcies created for persons with the surname Ramsden, one in the Baronetage of England and one in the Baronetage of the United Kingdom. The first creation is extant as of 2024.

The Ramsden, later Pennington, later Pennington-Ramsden Baronetcy, of Byram in the County of York, was created in the Baronetage of England on 30 November 1689 for John Ramsden in honour of the services given during the Glorious Revolution. The manor of Huddersfield had been in the family since 1599, and the Ramsden baronets retained this manor until 1920, when it was sold to the Corporation of the County Borough of Huddersfield, along with the substantial Ramsden Estate.

The third Baronet sat as Member of Parliament for Appleby. The fourth Baronet represented Grampound in the House of Commons. The fifth Baronet sat as Liberal Member of Parliament for Taunton, Hythe, the West Riding of Yorkshire and Monmouth then Under-Secretary of State for War from 1857 to 1858. The sixth Baronet served as High Sheriff of Buckinghamshire for 1920/21. The seventh Baronet assumed in 1925 by Deed Poll the surname of Pennington in lieu of his patronymic according to the will of the late Lord Muncaster (see Baron Muncaster); however, in 1958 he resumed the use of the surname of Ramsden in addition to that of Pennington. The subsequent Baronets have used the surname of Ramsden only. The seventh Baronet notably served as High Sheriff of Cumberland in 1962. The present and 9th Baronet retired from a career in HM Diplomatic Service after serving as the British Ambassador to Croatia from 2004 to 2008.

The Ramsden Baronetcy, of Birkensaw in the County of York, was created in the Baronetage of the United Kingdom on 1 July 1938. For more information on this creation, see Baron Ramsden.

== Ramsden, later Pennington, later Pennington-Ramsden baronets, now Ramsden, of Byram (1689) ==
- Sir John Ramsden, 1st Baronet (1648–1690)
- Sir William Ramsden, 2nd Baronet (1672–1736)
- Sir John Ramsden, 3rd Baronet (1699–1769)
- Sir John Ramsden, 4th Baronet (1755–1839)
  - John Charles Ramsden (1788–1836)
- Sir John William Ramsden, 5th Baronet (1831–1914)
- Sir John Frecheville Ramsden, 6th Baronet (1877–1958)
- Sir (Geoffrey) William Pennington-Ramsden, 7th Baronet (1904–1986)
- Sir Caryl Oliver Imbert Ramsden, 8th Baronet (1915–1987)
- Sir John Charles Josslyn Ramsden, 9th Baronet (born 1950)

The heir presumptive is the present baronet's sixth cousin once removed, Colin John Ramsden (born 1949), who lives in Tasmania and is a sixth-great-grandson of the second baronet through his younger son Robert Ramsden.
The heir-in-line is his son, Richard Ramsden (born 1979), who has two sons, Jake (born 2011) and Tiago (born 2013).

== Ramsden baronets, of Birkensaw (1938) ==
- see Baron Ramsden
