= George Warren (MP) =

British politician

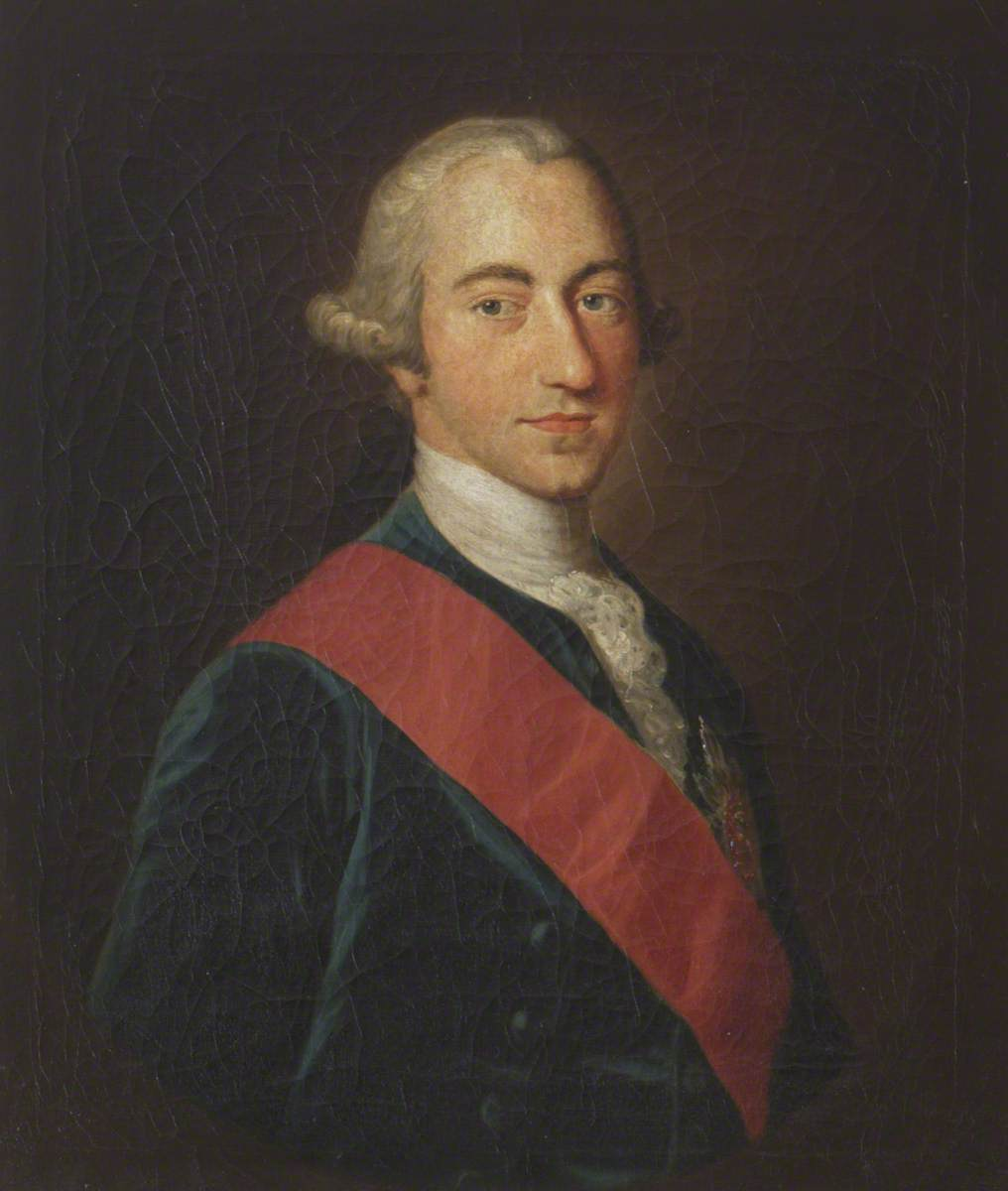
Portrait of Warren

Sir George Warren, KB (7 February 1735 – 31 August 1801) was a British politician who represented Lancaster and Beaumaris in the House of Commons of Great Britain between 1758 and 1796.

== Early life ==
Warren was the only son of Edward Warren of Poynton and his wife Elizabeth Cholmondeley, daughter of George Cholmondeley, 2nd Earl of Cholmondeley and was born on 7 February 1735. His father died two years later in 1737 and he inherited Poynton Lodge which he rebuilt in the 1750s. He joined the army and was ensign in the 3rd Foot Guards in 1755 and was promoted to captain in 1756. In May 1758 he eloped to Edinburgh with a rich heiress, Jane Revell daughter of Thomas Revell, MP of Fetcham Park, Surrey. She was a ward of Samuel Egerton of Tatton. Warren married Jane and the marriage settlement resolved the encumbrances on his estates. He then retired from the army.

== Political career ==
In December 1758 Warren was returned as Member of Parliament for Lancaster at a by-election on 22 December. His election was unopposed in return for a promise that at the next election he would contribute up to £2,000 towards finding a seat for the son of Lancaster's other MP, Francis Reynolds. He immediately began a campaign to have himself made a Knight of the Bath, an honour to which he believed his new wealth now entitled him, but the King angrily rejected the proposal when it was put to him by The Prime Minister, Thomas Pelham-Holles. However, once George III succeeded in 1760, Warren attached himself to Bute's party and secured his KB on 26 March 1761.

Warren was returned unopposed again as MP for Lancaster at the 1761 general election a few days later. His wife Jane died in 1761 and he remarried to Frances Bisshopp, daughter of Sir Cecil Bisshopp, 6th Baronet on 4 February 1764. In 1766, with Charles Roe, an industrialist from Macclesfield, he promoted a scheme to run a canal from the River Weaver near Northwich to the Mersey at Stockport, which would have opened a market for the coalfield on his Poynton estate. However a rival scheme of the Duke of Bridgewater, which linked Stockport to the Grand Trunk Canal, was submitted to Parliament on the same day and was chosen in preference by Parliament. Warren's estates included the manor of Stockport, and he tried to enforce feudal rights as the town grew with industrialisation, seeking to establish manorial monopolies on some goods and levy tolls on the importation of others. His attempts to enlarge his fortune made him unpopular throughout Lancashire and Cheshire.

Warren's unpopularity led the local merchants to oppose him at the 1768 general election, putting forward Lord John Cavendish as a candidate. Warren's support from Francis Reynolds was enough to ensure his return and the backing of his own influential family and of the Lowthers was insufficient to make a Cavendish victory likely. Early in the campaign, Cavendish wrote that "my opponents ... have engaged all the lower sort of people, and they spare no expense to keep them firm to them", and eventually he concluded that "my opponents were bidding any sums for votes, so that my success was very uncertain and an enormous expense inevitable." Cavendish withdrew a week before the election was due, leaving Warren to be returned unopposed. In 1774 Warren was returned unopposed for Lancaster again, but faced with the prospect of a contest at Lancaster did not stand there at the 1780 general election.

In 1777, Warren's daughter Elizabeth married Thomas Bulkeley, 7th Viscount Bulkeley. Bulkeley had an interest at Beaumaris and Warren was returned there unopposed in 1780. He did not stand anywhere in 1784 but narrowly won a contest at Lancaster at a by-election on 31 March 1786. There is no record of his speaking in Parliament.

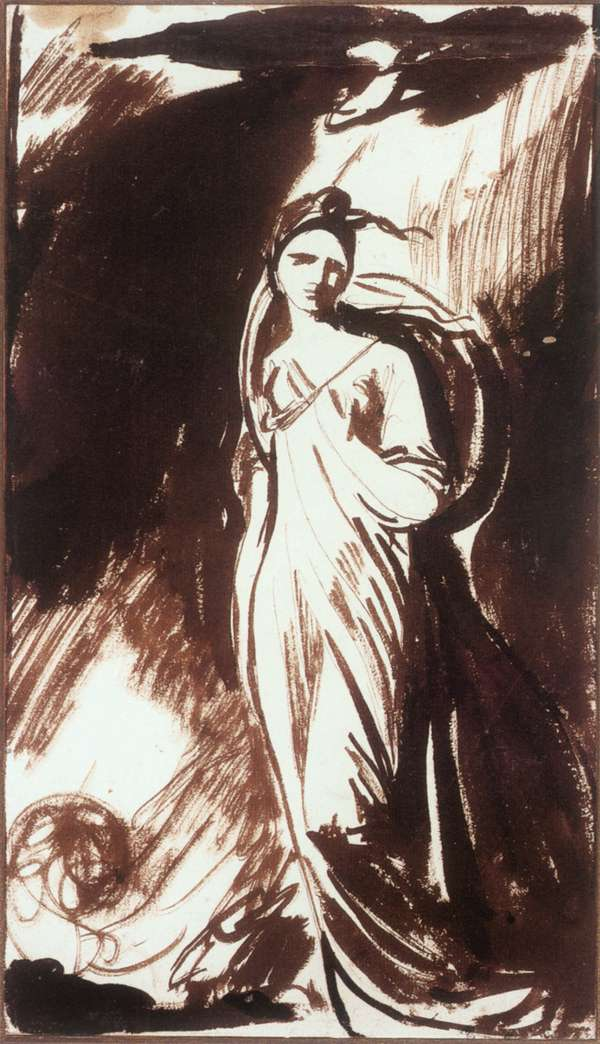
Study for Elizabeth Warren as Hebe

== Later years and legacy ==
Warren commissioned several portraits of his family from George Romney, whose group portrait of the family in 1769 was one of the pictures that helped make his reputation. A later portrait was of Warren's daughter, Elizabeth, to celebrate her marriage to Bulkeley in 1777. Romney depicting her as Hebe: this picture is now in the National Museum of Wales. Warren died on 31 August 1801 and was buried in the family vault after a lavish funeral procession. His son-in-law changed his surname to Warren-Bulkeley by Royal Licence to inherit the Warren fortune.

Parliament of Great Britain
Preceded by Francis Reynolds; Edward Marton	Member of Parliament for Lancaster; 1758–1780; With: Francis Reynolds 1758–73; Lord Richard Cavendish 1773–80	Succeeded by Wilson Braddyll; Abraham Rawlinson
Preceded by Lieutenant-Colonel Sir Hugh Williams	Member of Parliament for Beaumaris; 1780– 1784	Succeeded by Hon. Hugh Fortescue
Preceded by Abraham Rawlinson; Francis Reynolds	Member of Parliament for Lancaster; 1786–1796; With: Abraham Rawlinson 1786–90; John Dent 1790–96	Succeeded by Richard Penn; John Dent
