= Samuel Egerton =

British landowner and politician (1711–1780)

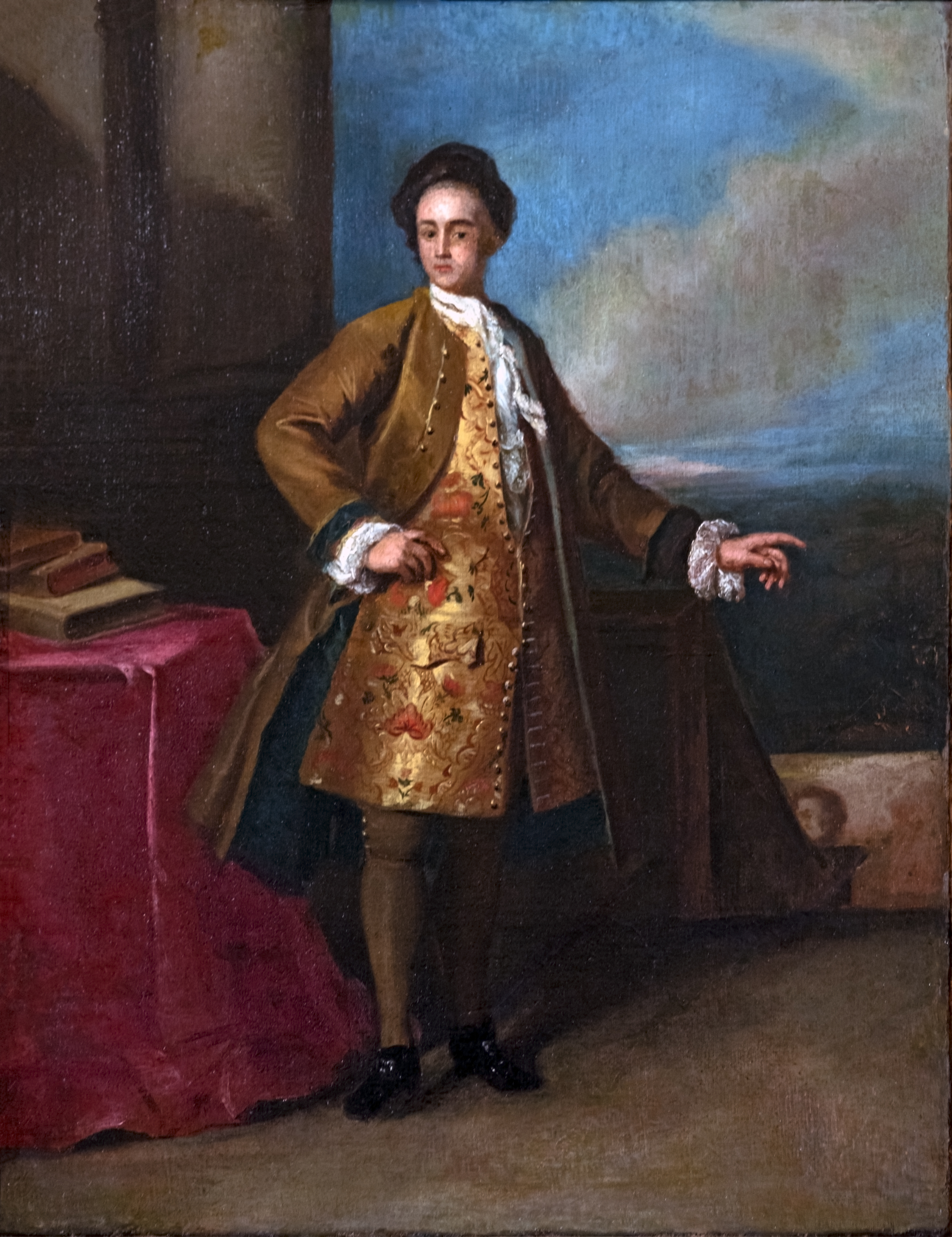
1730 portrait of Egerton by Bartolomeo Nazari

Samuel Egerton (28 December 1711 – 10 February 1780) was a British landowner and politician who represented Cheshire in the House of Commons of Great Britain from 1754 to 1780.

== Early life ==
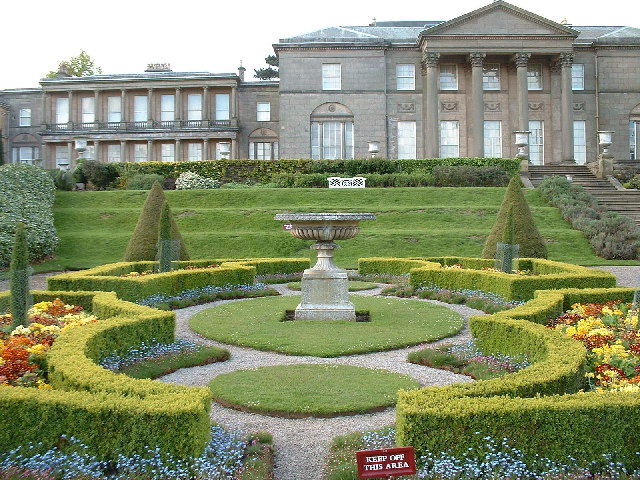
Tatton Park

Samuel Egerton was born on 28 December 1711 at the family home, Tatton Park in Cheshire. Samuel was the son of John Egerton, a grandson of John Egerton, 2nd Earl of Bridgwater, and Elizabeth Barbour, daughter of Samuel Barbour. As the second son of the family, and not the heir to the estate, he travelled to Italy, where from 1730 to 1735 he was an apprentice to the art-dealer and connoisseur Joseph Smith in Venice.

== Career ==
In 1738, Egerton became master of Tatton Park on the early death of his elder brother. In 1752, he became one of the guardians of Jane Revell, daughter of a relation by marriage, Thomas Revell of Fetcham Park. She was a minor in possession of a considerable fortune. In 1758, she eloped with and married George Warren, MP for Lancashire. In 1758, Egerton inherited a vast legacy from his uncle, Samuel Hill, and was then able to invest in improvements to Tatton Park.

Egerton was returned unopposed as Member of Parliament for Cheshire at the 1754 general election. He was re-elected unopposed at the general elections in 1761, 1768 and 1774, and he sat until his death in 1780.

== Marriage and family ==
Egerton married Beatrix Copley, daughter of the Rev. John Copley. Their only child was a daughter, Beatrix, who married Daniel Wilson of Dallam Tower. He was the son of Edward Wilson and grandson of Daniel Wilson). Beatrix Wilson died in childbirth in 1779, without leaving a surviving child. His sister Hester therefore became heiress of the Tatton estates. On 8 May 1780 her name was legally changed to Egerton by Royal Licence; her son William also adopted the surname of Egerton and was the ancestor of the Barons Egerton.
