= Giuseppe Grisoni =

Italian painter

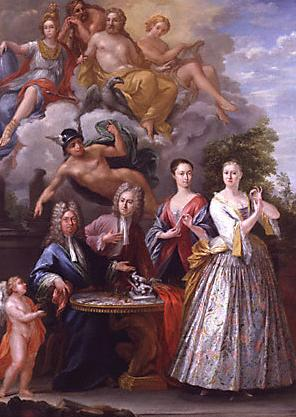
The Talman family by Grisoni

Giuseppe Pierre Joseph Grisoni (bapt. 24 October 1699–1769), also known as Grifoni or Grison, was an Italian painter and sculptor, noted for his landscapes and historical tableaux.

== Biography ==
Born in Mons, Spanish Netherlands, he studied in Florence under Tommaso Redi, abandoning his Flemish influences for the Italian tradition. In 1715 he travelled to London with John Talman and tried to establish himself as a portrait painter. He did not achieve enough success to stay, however, and returned to Florence in 1728 to teach at the Academy of Fine Arts. In 1740, he briefly relocated to Pisa before settling in Rome where he died.

One of his pupils was William Hoare (1707–1792).

== Works ==
- Family of William Talman (National Portrait Gallery)
- Self-portrait (Uffizi)
- Death of St Romuald (Uffizi)
- Statue of St Joseph (Florence, Church of Santissima Anunziata)
- Rape of Proserpina (Uffizi)

== See also ==
- Gallery of works.
