= Edward Knubley =

British Member of Parliament

Edward Knubley (aft. 1749 – 22 April 1815) was a British Member of Parliament, one of "Lord Lonsdale's ninepins". A client of Sir James Lowther, 5th Baronet (later Earl of Lonsdale), he was twice returned as member for Carlisle through Lonsdale's influence, only to have his election overturned on petition each time. He held local office and rank in northwestern England through Lonsdale's influence.

Knubley was born after 1749, the son of Edward Knubley of Fingland Rigg, Bowness-on-Solway, and his wife Ann Stoddart, of Wigton. Before 1784, Knubley married Margaret Carr, by whom he had a son and a daughter.

He was commissioned a captain in the Westmorland Militia in 1780 by Lowther, then the Lord Lieutenant of Westmorland. Lowther (Lord Lonsdale after 1784) arranged to have him pricked High Sheriff of Cumberland in 1785. This made him returning officer for Cumberland, a position of advantage to support Lowther's electioneering. Lonsdale had gained control of the corporation of Carlisle in 1784, and arranged for the creation of 1,400 mostly non-resident freemen of the city, largely selected from among his tenantry and outnumbering the existing freemen two-to-one. His opportunity to test his electoral strength there came in 1786, when the Earl of Surrey, sitting member and leader of the opposition to Lonsdale there, succeeded as Duke of Norfolk and vacated his seat. Lonsdale put forth Knubley as a candidate for Carlisle at the ensuing by-election of 29 November 1786. Knubley outpolled his rival Rowland Stephenson 554 to 405, but the election was overturned on petition on 26 February 1787 and Stephenson was seated.

Lonsdale continued his struggle to dominate Carlisle, obtaining the appointment of James Boswell as Recorder there in 1788 and scoring a legal victory in 1789 that allowed the sons of freemen to be made freemen without membership in a guild. The 1790 British general election there was riotous, marked by mob violence that led to the destruction of Lonsdale's townhouse. Knubley and James Clarke Satterthwaite, the Lonsdale candidates, were returned with 503 votes each, over the incumbent John Christian Curwen and fellow independent Wilson Braddyll with 399 and 394. Curwen, Braddyll, and some of the freemen bore the expense of an election petition against the result. The result was a determination, on 3 March 1791, that the franchise in Carlisle was limited to freemen admitted to the city's guilds, and free either as sons of freemen or having served out an apprenticeship to a freeman. This disenfranchised the honorary freemen created at Lonsdale's direction, and Knubley and Satterthwaite were unseated in favor of their rivals. By this time, Knubley had married his second wife, Sarah Borradaile, by whom he had three sons and a daughter.

A further challenge by Lonsdale to overturn the decision on the Carlisle franchise was defeated in 1795. During the 1796 British general election, Lonsdale, with ministerial support, put up Knubley and James Graham, with the support of the Pitt ministry, against Curwen and Sir Frederick Fletcher-Vane. After a strenuously-contested fifteen-day poll, Curwen and Fletcher-Vane emerged the victors, and a petition against them by Knubley and Graham was rejected. Lonsdale did not again offer Knubley as a candidate for Parliament. At the time of the 1790 general election, Knubley expressed his opinion of Lonsdale to Boswell: "a most tyrannical temper and not a spark of gratitude." Nonetheless, he remained Lonsdale's creature and worked to support him in Cumberland. His efforts for the family were rewarded by Lonsdale's cousin and heir, Viscount Lowther (later Earl of Lonsdale). He was promoted to lieutenant-colonel in the Westmorland Militia in 1803. In 1808, Knubley was rewarded with the post of collector of customs at Whitehaven, the seat of Lowther power, and in the same year, Lonsdale commissioned him major of the Whitehaven volunteer artillery. He died on 22 April 1815.

== Notes ==
Parliament of Great Britain
Preceded by Earl of Surrey; John Christian	Member of Parliament for Carlisle; 1786–1787; With: John Christian	Succeeded by John Christian; Rowland Stephenson
Preceded by John Christian Curwen; Rowland Stephenson	Member of Parliament for Carlisle; 1790–1791; With: James Clarke Satterthwaite	Succeeded by John Christian Curwen; Wilson Braddyll
Honorary titles
Preceded by John Christian	High Sheriff of Cumberland; 1785–1786	Succeeded by Sir James Graham
