= Abraham Rawlinson =

English politician and merchant

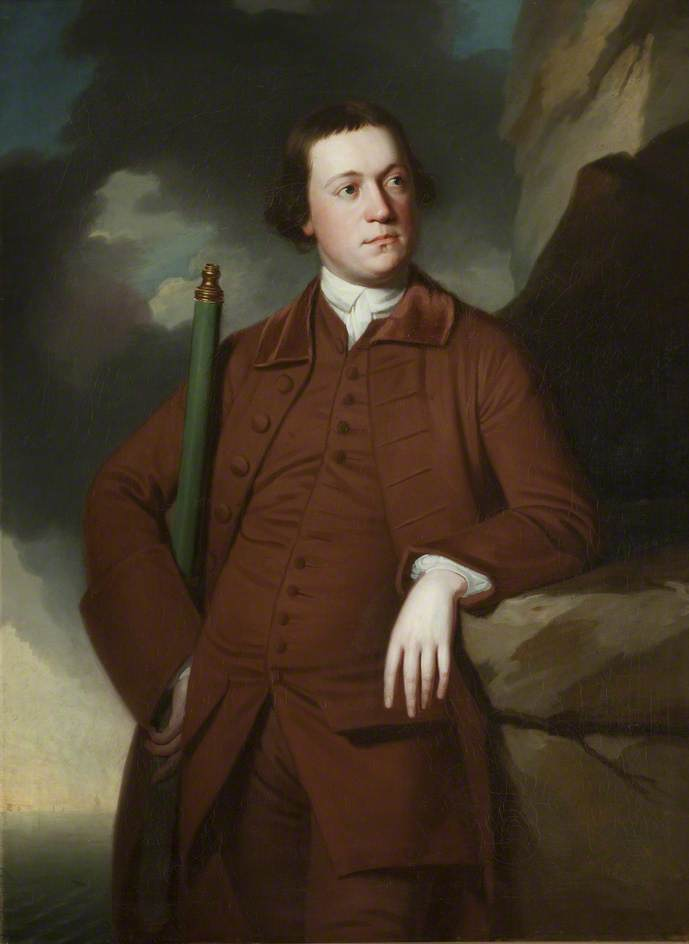
Portrait of Abraham Rawlinson by George Romney in the Judges' Lodgings, Lancaster.

Abraham Rawlinson (1738–24 May 1803) was an English politician and merchant. He came from a prominent Quaker family which traded out of the port of Lancaster. Rawlinson served as one of two Members of Parliament for Lancaster from 1780 to 1790. Abraham Rawlinson was the son of Thomas Hutton Rawlinson (1712–69) and his wife Mary (née Dilworth). He took over his father's business in 1756, creating a new company, Abraham Rawlinson Junr. & Co. Rawlinson was involved in the importation of mahogany.

Rawlinson was painted by George Romney. The portrait was done in the 1760s before Rawlinson became an MP, and shows the subject holding a telescope to indicate his mercantile interests: it is currently on display in the Judges' Lodgings Museum, Lancaster. The museum also has a silver cup presented to him in 1790 by his "fellow citizens" in gratitude for his parliamentary service.

Rawlinson died 24 May 1803.

== MP ==
Rawlinson appears to have given up his membership of the Quakers by the time he became an MP, as he would otherwise not have been able to swear an oath of allegiance to the King, a requirement which excluded Quakers from parliament until the nineteenth century. In the 1780s he gave an organ to St John the Evangelist's Church, Lancaster, an Anglican church which was being enlarged at the time.

As an MP, he consistently opposed the campaign for the abolition of the slave trade. The Slave Trade Act 1788 regulated the trade for the first time and in 1799 an Act of Parliament decreed slaving ships could only sail from Liverpool, London and Bristol, but the slave trade was not abolished until after Rawlinson's death.

== Other family members ==
Abraham Rawlinson is not to be confused with his uncle of the same name, Abraham Rawlinson (1709-1780), who was also a West Indies merchant and was also painted by Romney. The elder Abraham Rawlinson's son, Henry Rawlinson, was MP for Liverpool, and the two cousins were sometimes confused in the records of parliament.

Parliament of Great Britain
Preceded by Lord Richard Cavendish; Sir George Warren	Member of Parliament for Lancaster; 1780-90; With: Wilson Gale-Braddyll (1780-84); Francis Reynolds Moreton (1784–1785); Sir George Warren (1786–1790)	Succeeded by Sir George Warren; John Dent
