= Thomas Revell =

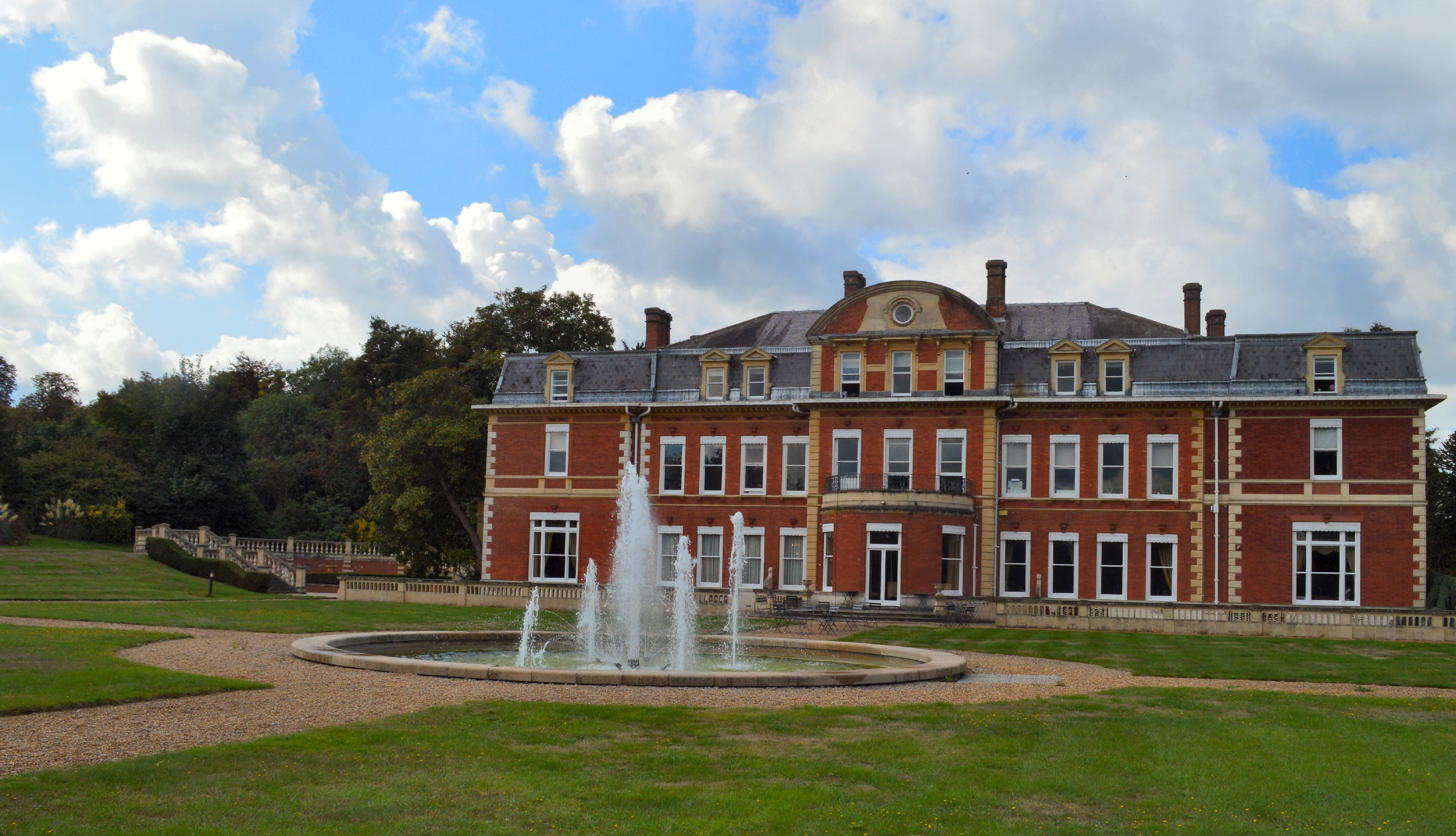
Revell's country seat, Fetcham Park

Thomas Revell (died 1752) was a British victualler and politician who represented Dover in the House of Commons of Great Britain from 1734 to 1752.

Revell's origins are unknown but in 1716 he was a victualling agent at Lisbon. He became a Commissioner of Victualling in 1728 and in 1733 was contracted to provision the garrison at Gibraltar. He was elected Member of Parliament for Dover in a contest at the 1734 general election. In 1735 he was able to purchase Fetcham Park in Surrey with the proceeds of his contracting, and he continued to benefit from army contracts for the rest of his life. He married as his third wife Jane Egerton, daughter of Hon. William Egerton at St Georges Hanover Square on 2 May 1738. He was re-elected MP for Dover in a contest in 1741 and unopposed in 1747. However, in June 1747 he resigned his office of Commissioner, as the Place Act 1742 made it impossible to hold such office and be an MP.

Revell died on 26 January 1752 and was buried at Fetcham on 7 February. He left his daughter Jane in the wardship of his brother and Samuel Egerton of Tatton. She was a minor at his death in possession of a reasonable fortune. In 1758 she eloped with and married George Warren.

Parliament of Great Britain
Preceded by George Berkeley; Henry Furnese	Member of Parliament for Dover; 1734–1752; With: David Papillon 1734-1741; Lord George Sackville 1741-1752	Succeeded by Lord George Sackville; William Cayley
