= William Talman (architect) =

English architect and landscape designer

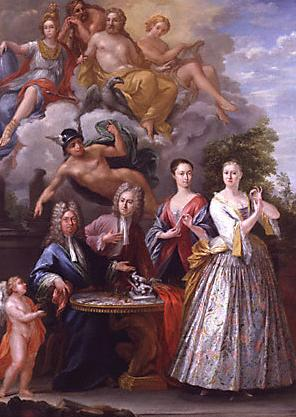
- William Talman, his son John Talman, his daughter Frances Cokayne, and his wife, Hannah Talman, by Giuseppe Grisoni, c.1718–19, NPG
- Born: 1650; Eastcott Manor House West Lavington, Wiltshire, England
- Died: 22 November 1719 (aged 68–69); Felmingham, Norfolk, England
- Occupation: Architect
- Buildings: Chatsworth House

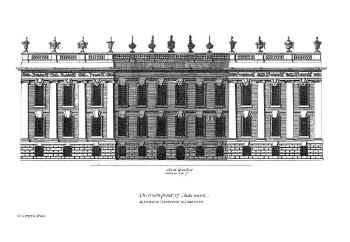
The south front of Chatsworth from Colen Campbell's Vitruvius Britannicus

William Talman (1650 – 22 November 1719) was an English architect and landscape designer.

== Career ==
A pupil of Sir Christopher Wren, in 1678, he and Thomas Apprice gained the office of King's Waiter in the Port of London (perhaps through his patron Henry Hyde, 2nd Earl of Clarendon). From May 1689 until William III's death in 1702, he was Comptroller of the Royal Works, and also in 1689 William Bentinck appointed Talman and George London as his deputies in his new role as Superintendent of the Royal Gardens. In these roles, Talman worked with Wren in his rebuilding of Hampton Court Palace and its gardens and, by proposing a cheaper interior decoration scheme for the new building, won that commission over Wren's head.

== Works ==
Talman's principal work is recognised to be Chatsworth House, considered to be the first baroque private house in Britain, and he was possibly the architect of St Anne's Church, Soho. Talman was held by many to be surly, rude and difficult to get on with. One of those who felt so was Charles Howard, who chose John Vanbrugh, not Talman, as his architect for Castle Howard (Vanburgh had also been Talman's replacement as Comptroller of the Royal Works in May 1702.)

During his long career, Talman worked on many of England's country houses. These include:

- The banqueting house at Hampton Court Palace, for William III
- Cannons, Edgware (1713)
- Drayton House, Northamptonshire (c.1702)
- Dyrham Park, Gloucestershire (1698)
- Fetcham Park House, Surrey (1699)
- Hanbury Hall, Worcestershire
- Herriard Park, Hampshire (c.1700)
- Kimberley Hall, Norfolk (c.1700)
- Lowther Castle, Cumbria (1692)
- Milton Hall, Peterborough (UA)
- Swallowfield Park, Berkshire (1689)
- Uppark, West Sussex (c.1690, UA)
- Waldershare Park, Kent (1705, attributed).

== Gallery of architectural works ==
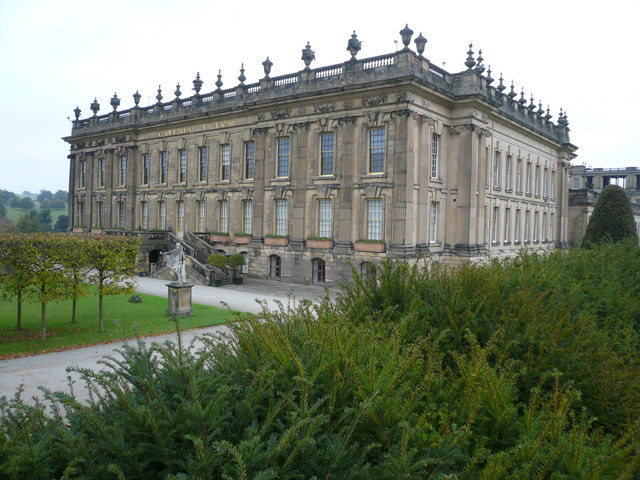
Chatsworth House, south & east fronts

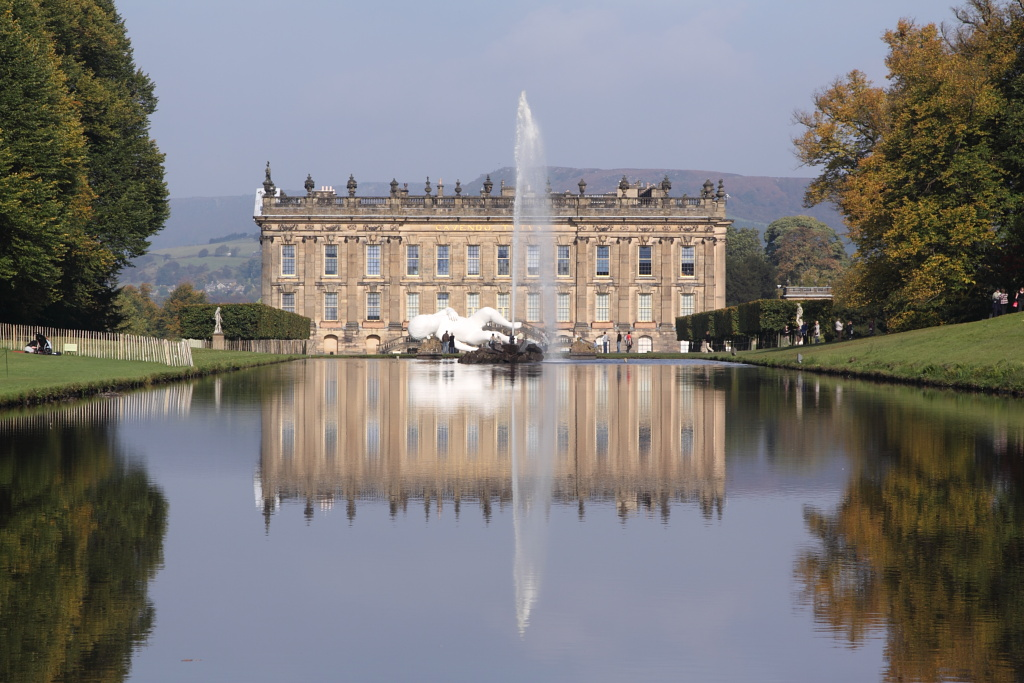
Chatsworth House, south front

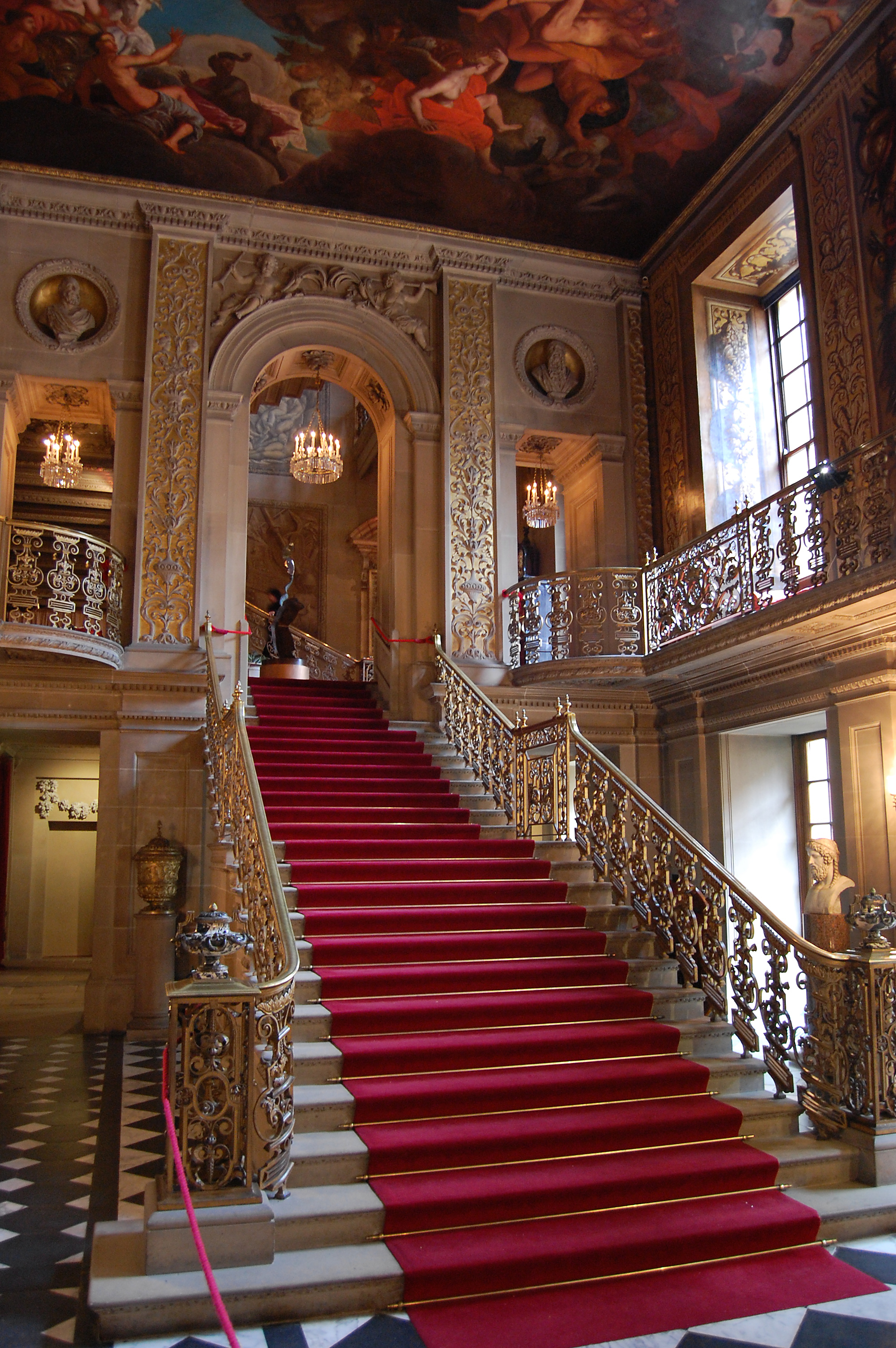
Chatsworth, Painted Hall

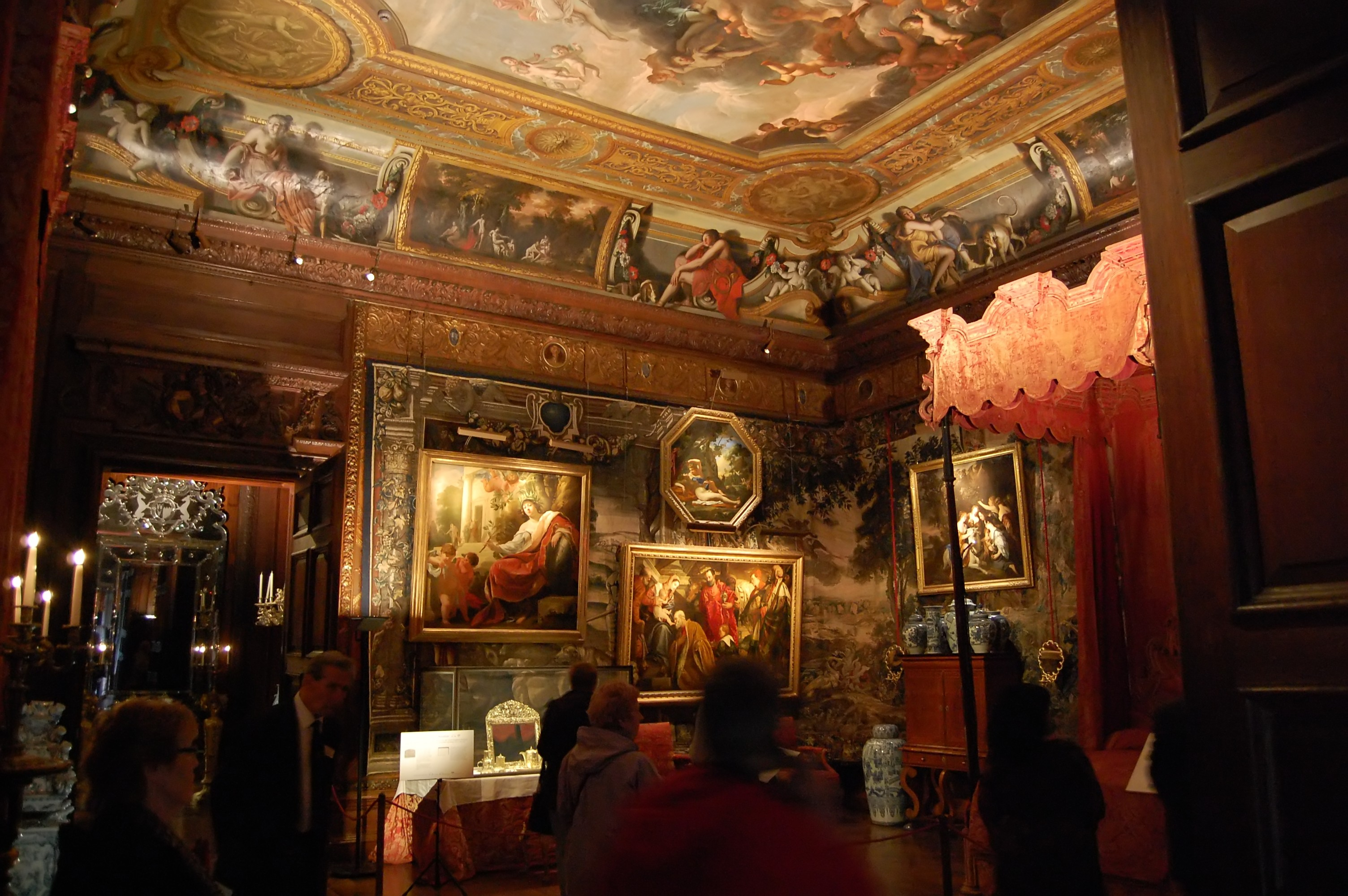
Chatsworth, State Bedroom

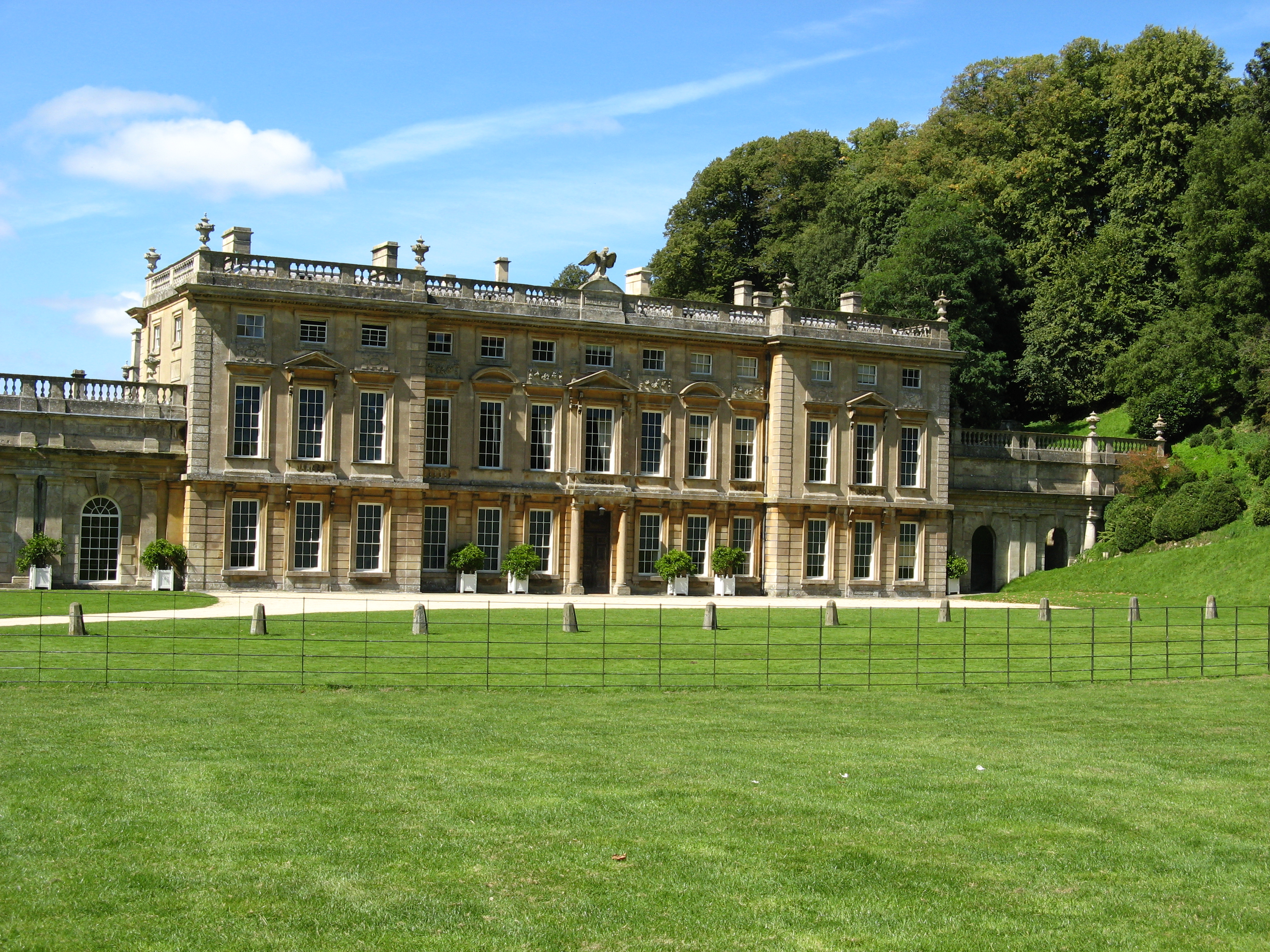
Dyrham House, east front

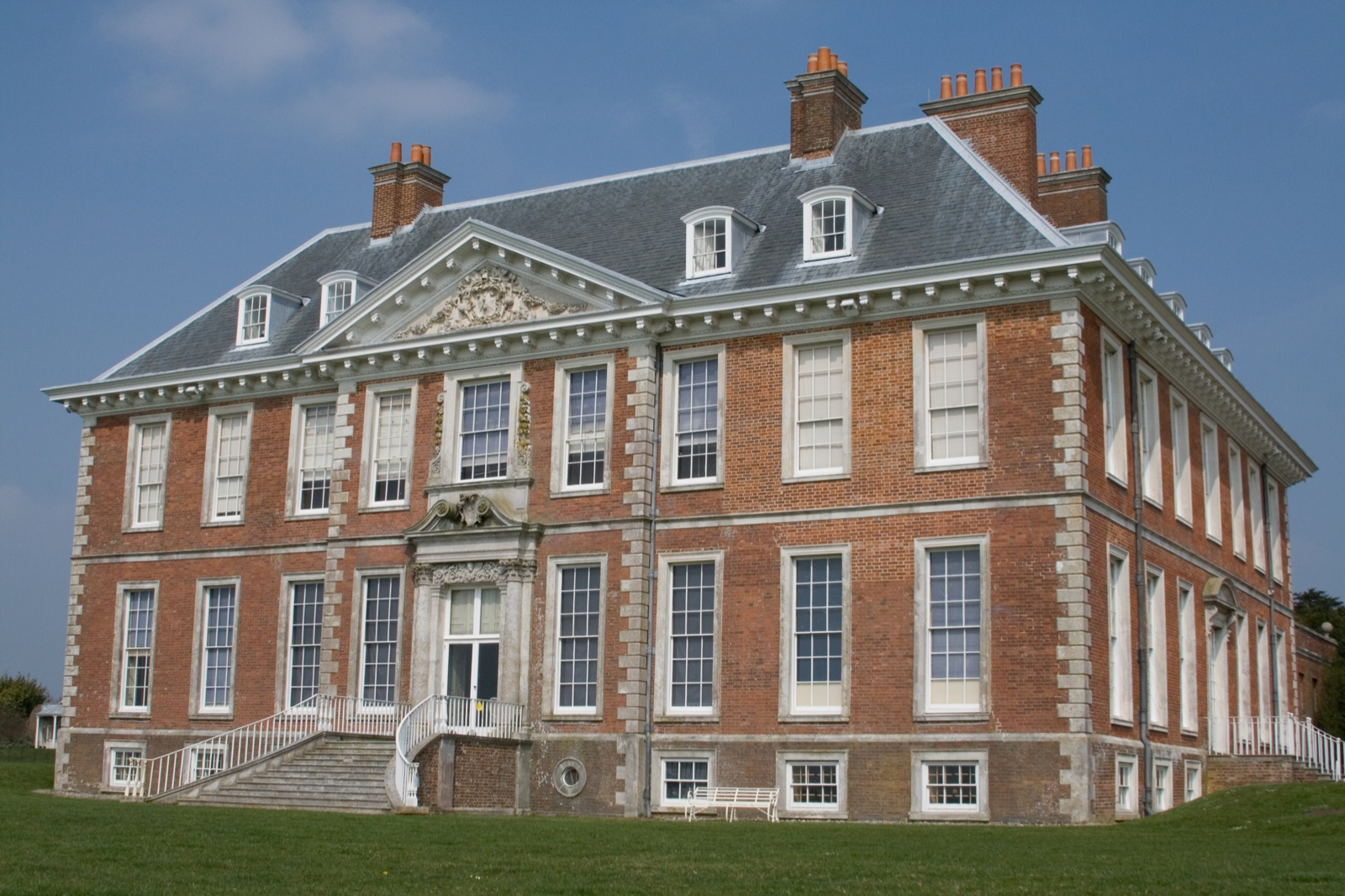
Uppark, south front

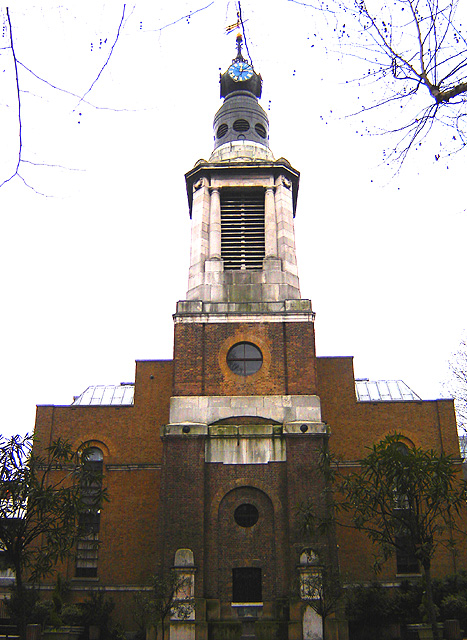
St. Anne's Soho

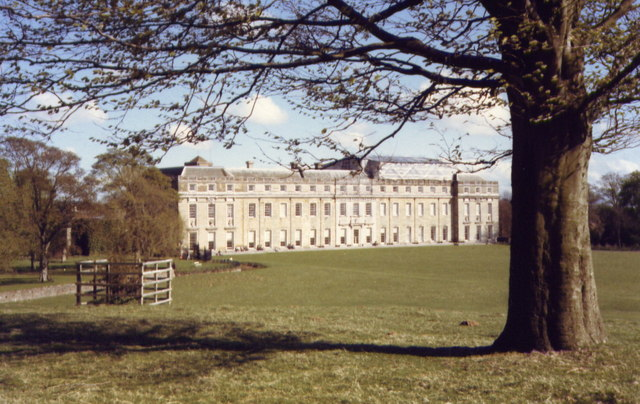
Petworth House, West Sussex

== Bibliography ==
- Harris, John, The Hampton Court Trianon Designs of William and John Talman, in Journal of the Warburg and Courtauld Institutes, xxiii, 1960.
- Harris, John, William Talman: Maverick Architect. London, Allen and Unwin. 1982. Studies in Architecture, 2.
- Saunders, Edward, Bretby Hall, in Derbyshire Life, August 1975.
- Whinney, M.D., William Talman, in Journal of the Warburg and Courtauld Institutes, xviii, 1955.

Court offices
Preceded by Hugh May	Comptroller of the King's Works; 1668 – 1684	Succeeded by John Vanbrugh
