= Wilson Gale-Braddyll =

British Member of Parliament

Wilson Gale-Braddyll (baptised 24 February 1756 – 19 November 1818) was a British Member of Parliament.

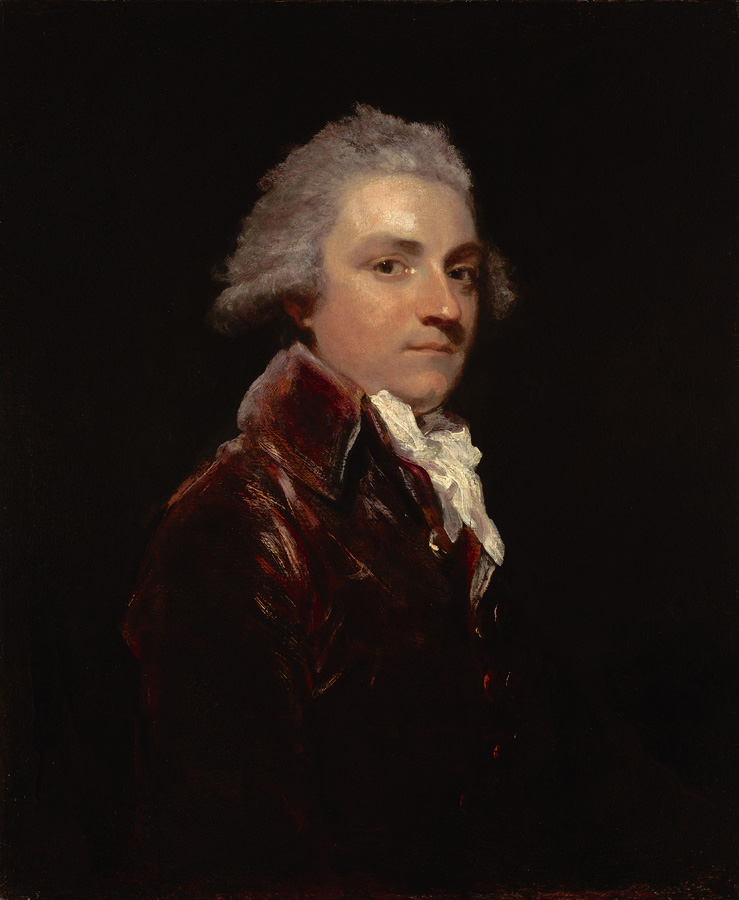
Gale Braddyll by Sir Joshua Reynolds.

He was born Wilson Gale, the eldest son of John Gale of Highhead Castle, Cumberland by Sarah, daughter of Christopher Wilson of Bardsea Hall Urswick. Sarah's sister Margaret Wilson was the first wife of the Rev. Roger Baldwin, rector of Aldingham. Through his mother Wilson Gale was to become representative of the family of Braddyll of Conishead Priory near Ulverston, and in consequence he added that name to his own in 1776. The same year he married his second cousin Jane, only child of Matthias Gale of Catgill Hall, Cumberland, by Jane, daughter of Rev. Dr. Thomas Bennett.

Gale-Braddyll was High Sheriff of Lancashire in 1778, MP for Lancaster 1780–1784 and for Carlisle 1790. In 1803 he was appointed Colonel of the 3rd Royal Lancashire Militia (which gained the subtitle 'The Prince Regent's Own' under his command) and Groom of the Bedchamber to the Prince Regent (the King had retired to Windsor mentally ill) in 1812.

Members of the family were painted several times by Joshua Reynolds in 1788 and 1789. A full-length group portrait of Wilson and Jane with their son Thomas is now held by the Fitzwilliam Museum, Cambridge, while a portrait of Mrs. Braddyll hangs in the Wallace Collection.

As well as Thomas (later Thomas Richmond-Gale-Braddyll) the couple had three married daughters. Mrs. Braddyll survived her husband for a little under a year, dying 6 November 1819. They are commemorated by a memorial inscription in Ulverston church.

Parliament of Great Britain
Preceded by Sir George Warren; Lord Richard Cavendish	Member of Parliament for Lancaster; 1780–1784; With: Abraham Rawlinson	Succeeded by Captain Francis Reynolds; Abraham Rawlinson
Preceded by Jeremiah Crutchley; Philip Metcalfe	Member of Parliament for Horsham; 1790–1792; With: Timothy Shelley	Succeeded by Lord William Gordon; James Baillie
Preceded by James Clarke Satterthwaite; Edward Knubley	Member of Parliament for Carlisle; 1791–1796; With: John Christian Curwen	Succeeded by Sir Frederick Fletcher-Vane, Bt; John Christian Curwen
