= John Talman =

British antiquary & art collector (1677–1726)

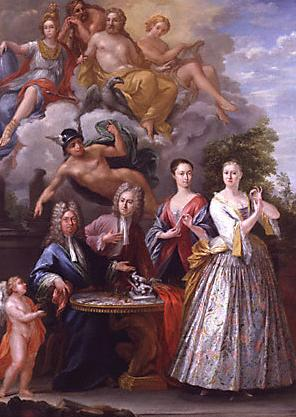
John Talman, in the centre between his father William (seated, far left) and his sister Frances and his mother Hannah (right), by Giuseppe Grisoni, c. 1718–19 (NPG)

John Talman FSA (July 1677, King's Street, Westminster – 3 November 1726, London) was a British antiquary and art collector. He was the eldest son of William Talman and his wife Hannah. From 1709 to 1717 he toured in Italy, collecting antiquities, becoming friends with the antiquarian pope Clement XI and enjoying the freedom to practice his Catholicism. On his return, he was a founder-member of the Society of Antiquaries of London.
