= Francis Reynolds (politician) =

British politician

Francis Reynolds (died 12 August 1773) was a British politician. He inherited Strangeways Hall in Manchester from his father Thomas Reynolds. Francis Reynolds was Member of Parliament for Lancaster from 1745 until his death in 1773.
