= Fetcham Park House =

House in Mole Valley, Surrey, England

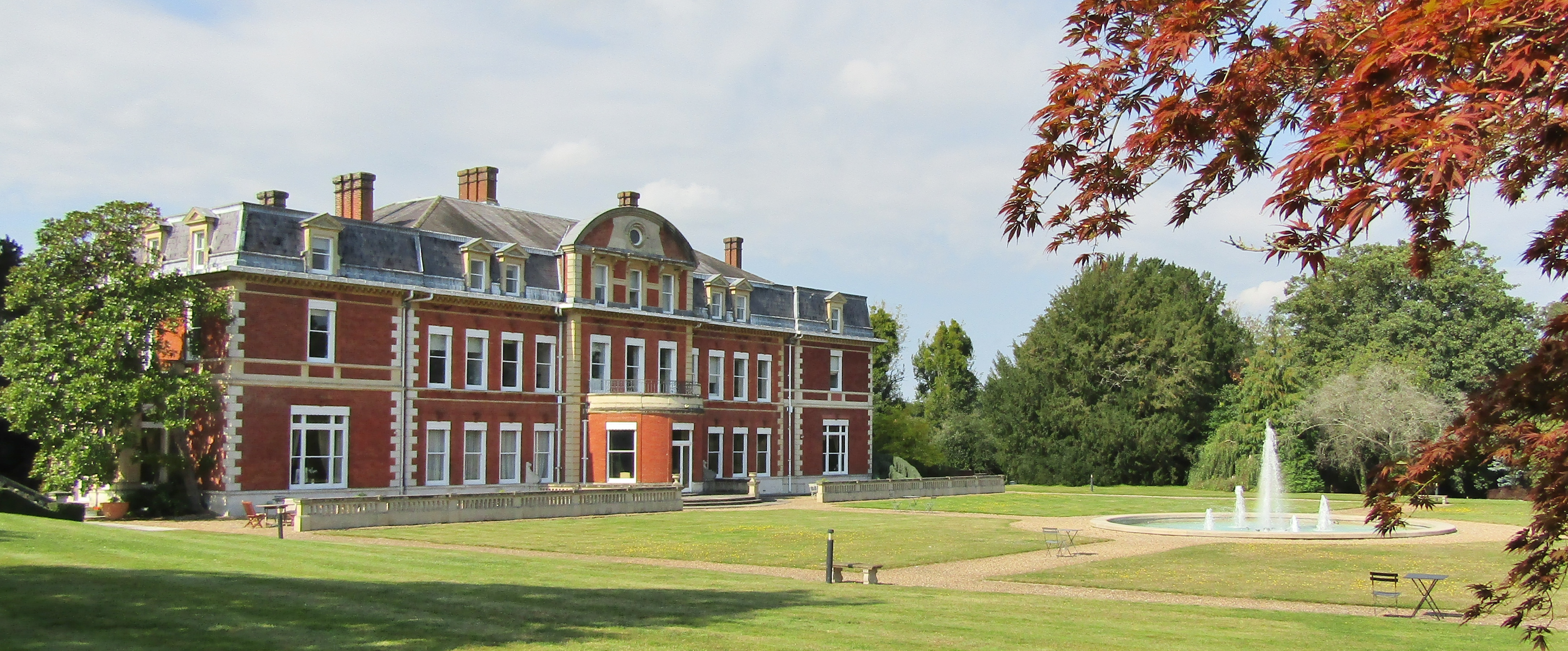
- East front

- Location within Surrey
- 51°17′19″N 0°21′08″W
- Location: Fetcham, Surrey
- OS grid reference: TQ 15003 55674

History
- Built: 1699

Site notes
- Architect: William Talman
- Architectural style: Queen Anne

Listed Building – Grade II*
- Official name: Fetcham Park House
- Designated: 24 August 1990
- Reference no.: 1188810

Fetcham Park House is a Queen Anne mansion designed by the English architect William Talman with internal murals by the renowned artist Louis Laguerre and grounds originally landscaped by George London. It is located in the parish of Fetcham near Leatherhead in Surrey.

Construction of the present mansion began in 1699, although a reference in the Domesday survey suggests that there was already then a house at Fetcham Park. The house is built of red brick in Flemish bond with dressings of Portland stone, sandstone and terracotta with a slate roof and brick chimneys. The floor plan is rectangular under a 2-span roof with extensions at both ends and an added bay to the east front. The house is constructed in two and a half storeys over cellars, with an original west front of 8 bays, with additions of 1 bay to the left and 2 bays to the right and features a mix of both mansard and gambrel roofing. It is a Grade II* listed building, the second highest ranking.

== History ==
The mansion was commissioned by Henry Vincent, who inherited the estate from his father in 1697. He chose William Talman, an established architect with a reputation for his mercurial temperament, who was a pupil of Christopher Wren and was in the service of William III at Hampton Court Palace. Before construction was complete, Vincent moved to Norfolk and let Fetcham Park House to Arthur Moore MP.

Fetcham Park House was sold to Moore for £8,250 in 1705. He invested a fortune on the house and grounds, commissioning the stairway murals and ceiling paintings by the celebrated French artist Louis Laguerre, whose work can also be seen at Blenheim Palace and Hampton Court. Laguerre was born in Paris in 1663 and came to England in 1684. His father had been in charge of the royal menagerie and Louis XIV was his godfather. As well as Fetcham Park House and Chatsworth, he worked at Burghley, Blenheim Palace, Marlborough House, Hampton Court and Buckingham House.

But Moore spent so extravagantly that after his death in 1730 there were insufficient funds to maintain the estate and it was sold in 1737 to Thomas Revell, Agent Victualler at Gibraltar. Revell's descendants sold the estate, then totalling 1,326 acres (5.37 km^{2}), to John Richardson in 1788.

It was soon re-sold to the London banker Thomas Hankey, whose family owned it for the next 138 years. Before his death in 1793 Thomas Hankey added two curved wings at the north and south ends of the house. By 1875 John Hankey inherited the property and commissioned a major refurbishment by the respected architect Edward I'Anson. This was designed to alter the appearance of the house and brought French and Flemish influences to the original Queen Anne design and the later Georgian additions. I’Anson's legacy includes the mansard roof and typical Flemish turreted tower block on the west side, providing an entrance hall and two rooms above, and a two-storey wing at the south end of the house.

Captain George Hankey was the last of the family to live in the house, dying there in October 1924. Many members of the Hankey family are buried in the graveyard adjoining Fetcham Park.

The house remained empty for two years until it was acquired by the Reverend James Wilkie, Rector of the Parish of Badingham in Suffolk. Land to the east and south was sold for a housing development but Wilkie turned the mansion into a boys’ boarding school called Badingham College. Internal alterations were made and new buildings were added in the grounds, now less than 30 acres (120,000 m^{2}).

The school thrived, but it had to be closed down in 1940 after several bombs had landed in the grounds. For the duration of the war, the building was taken over by University College Hospital's pre-clinical medical school. Reverend Wilkie succeeded in restarting the school after the war, although he had to fight off a compulsory purchase order in the process. After he died in 1953, two of his sons took over the running of the school. In 1965, however, the school was moved to Norfolk and most of the grounds were sold off, leaving the mansion with four and a quarter acres. The house was badly neglected in the next few years, being "argued over, fought about and discussed but not occupied" (Surrey Villages, Pitt and Shaw, 1971). In 1979 the then derelict building was sold for £775,000 to a company called United Trading Group, which spent around £4 million returning it to its former splendour. False walls concealing Laguerre's stair and hall paintings were removed and his artwork sensitively restored after the ravages of Victorian over-embellishment, smoke damage from a fire and damp from a leaking roof.

The 1980–81 alterations included an extension to the second floor and the addition of catering facilities in the basement. Two of the rooms on the ground floor east side were panelled in oak and mahogany and the Shell Room, with its magnificent ceiling painting, was among those where the plasterwork, gilding and architectural details were painstakingly restored. The first and second floors were redecorated and adorned with mainly French antique furniture and some fine paintings. The grounds were replanted and ponds and illuminated fountains were created. During the renovation, the discovery of tunnels at the front of the house led to speculation about their history but they were later found to be Second World War air raid shelters.

UTG House, as it was then known, was sold in 1986 and renamed Fetcham Park House before being sold, with its contents, to local property investors The Wilky Group Ltd in 1999.

== Today ==
Fetcham Park House is currently operated as a business centre providing flexible office space, meeting rooms and event spaces. The house is available for exclusive use during most weekends and public holidays throughout the year and is licensed for civil ceremonies.

== In popular culture ==
The house featured in the 2013 film Diana, which chronicles the life of Diana, Princess of Wales. Its salon and drawing room represented the Imperial Suite at the Paris Ritz.

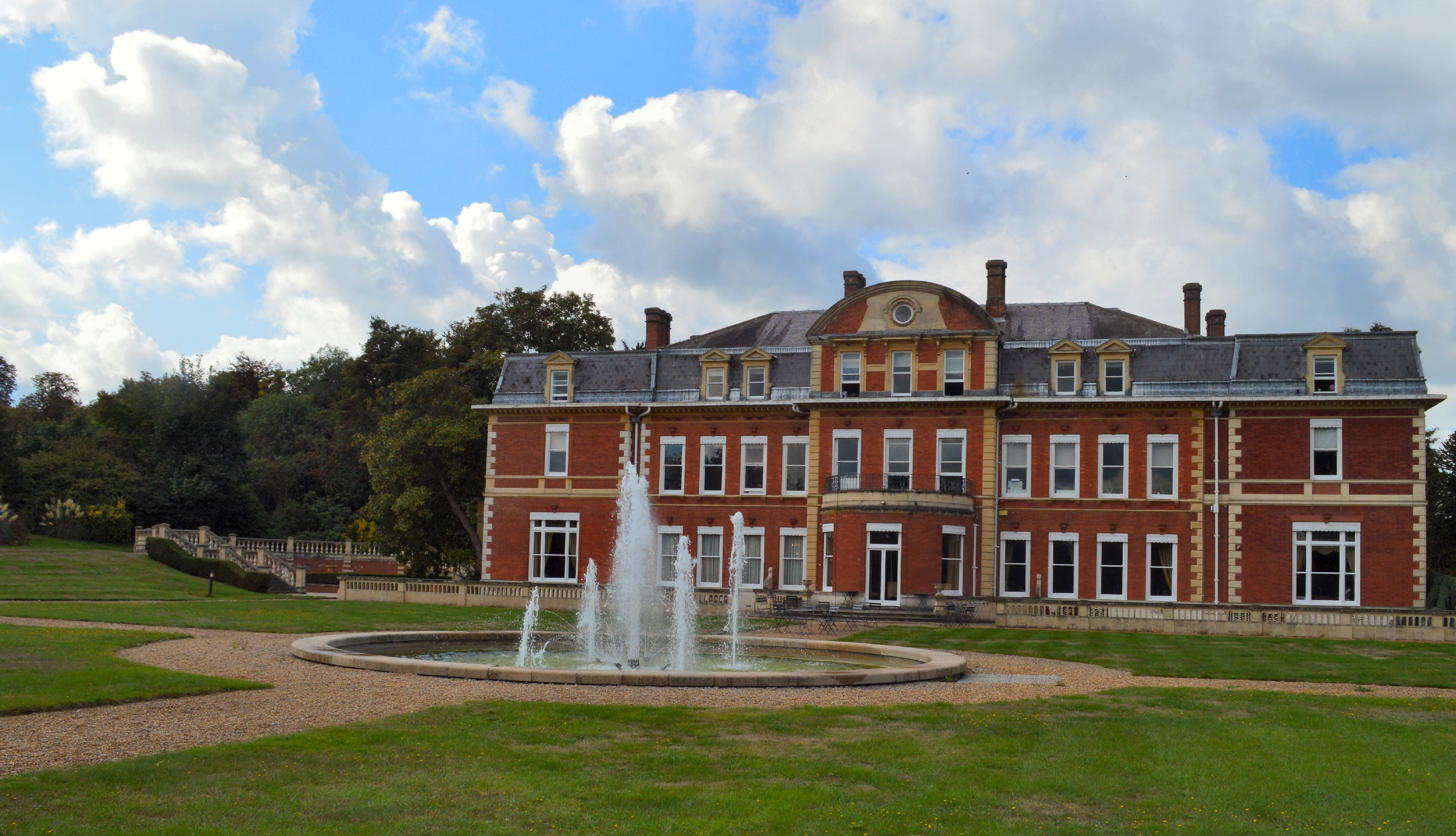
View from the garden

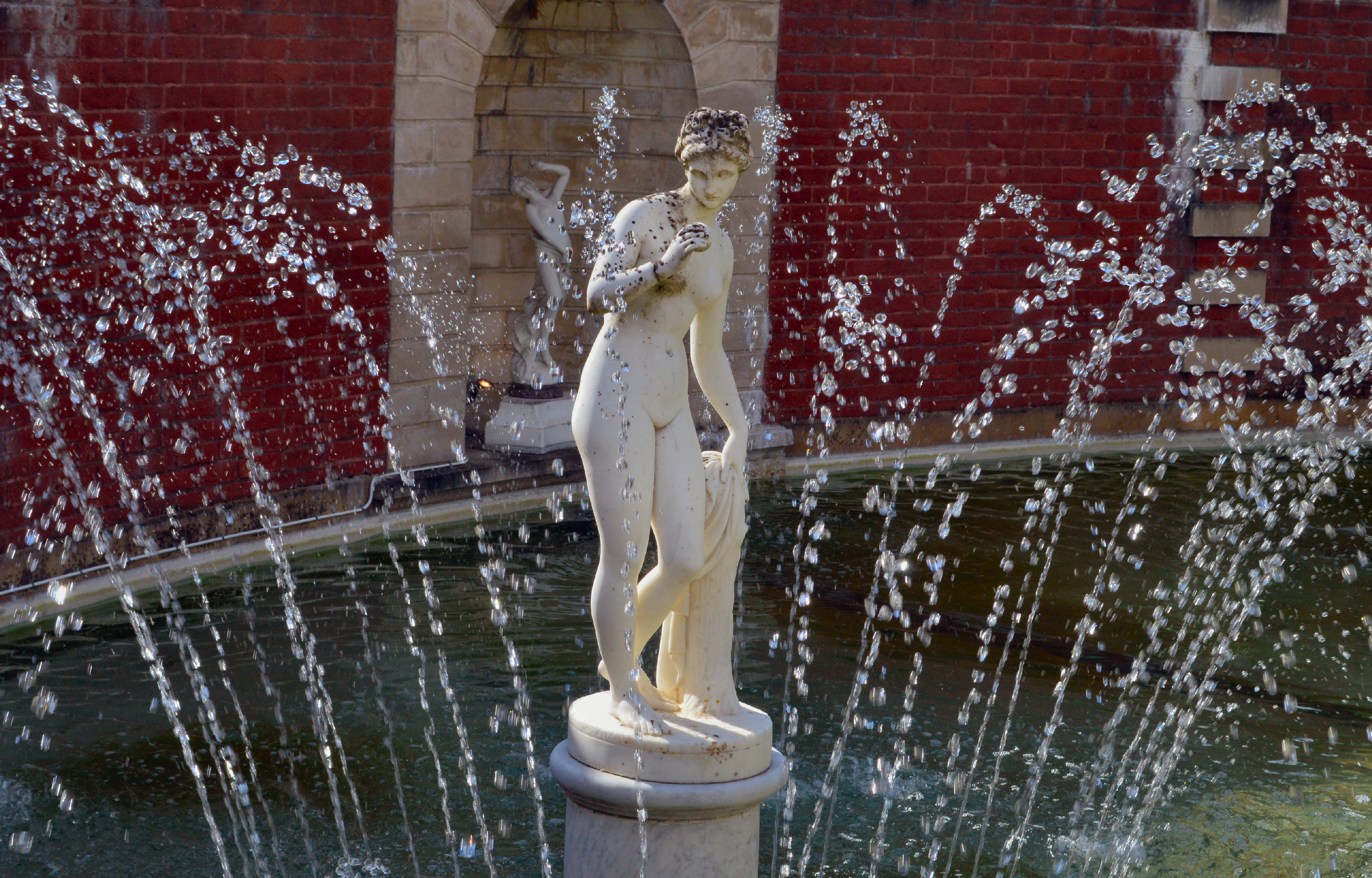
The fountain

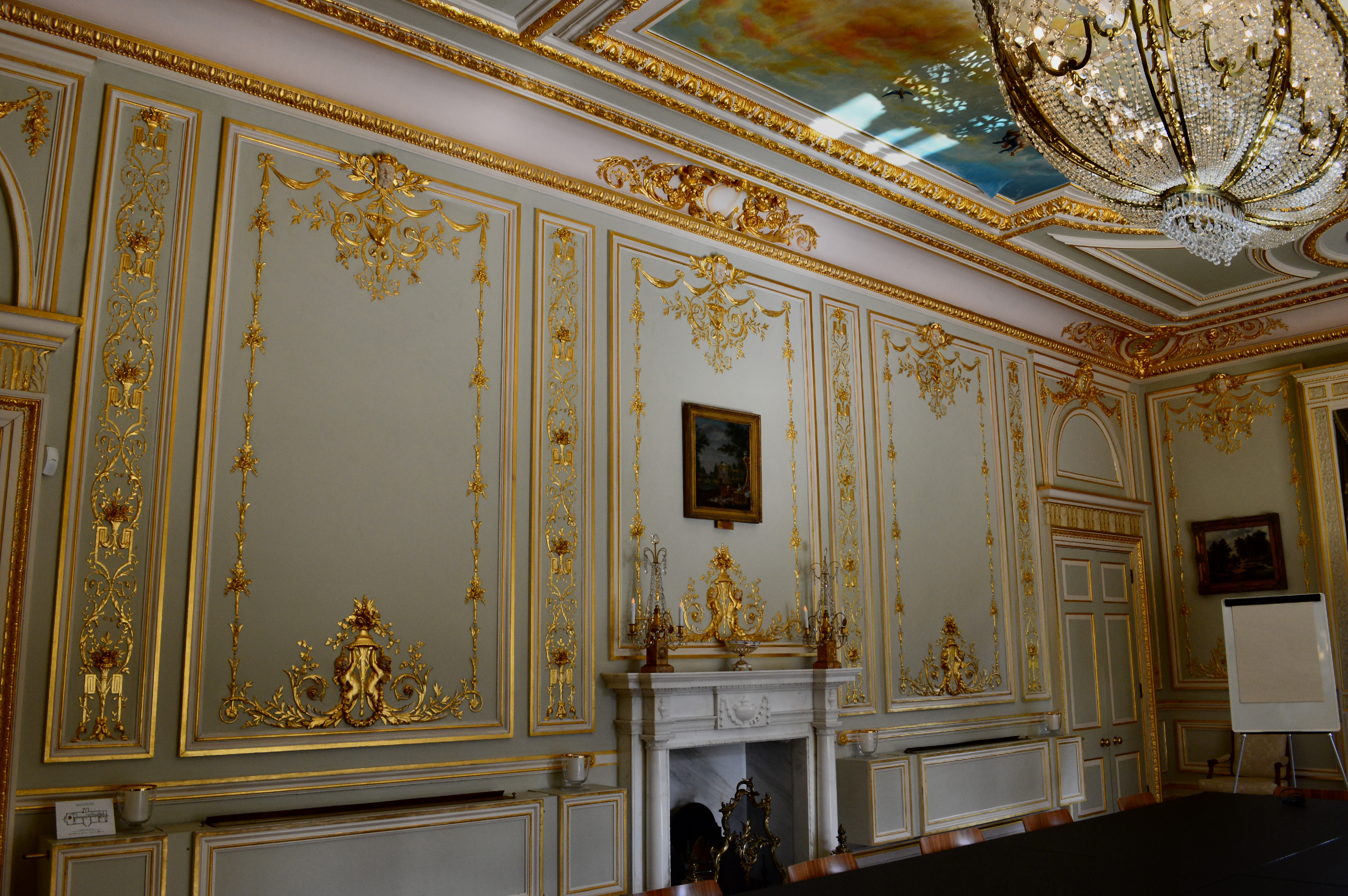
Louis Salon/Ballroom

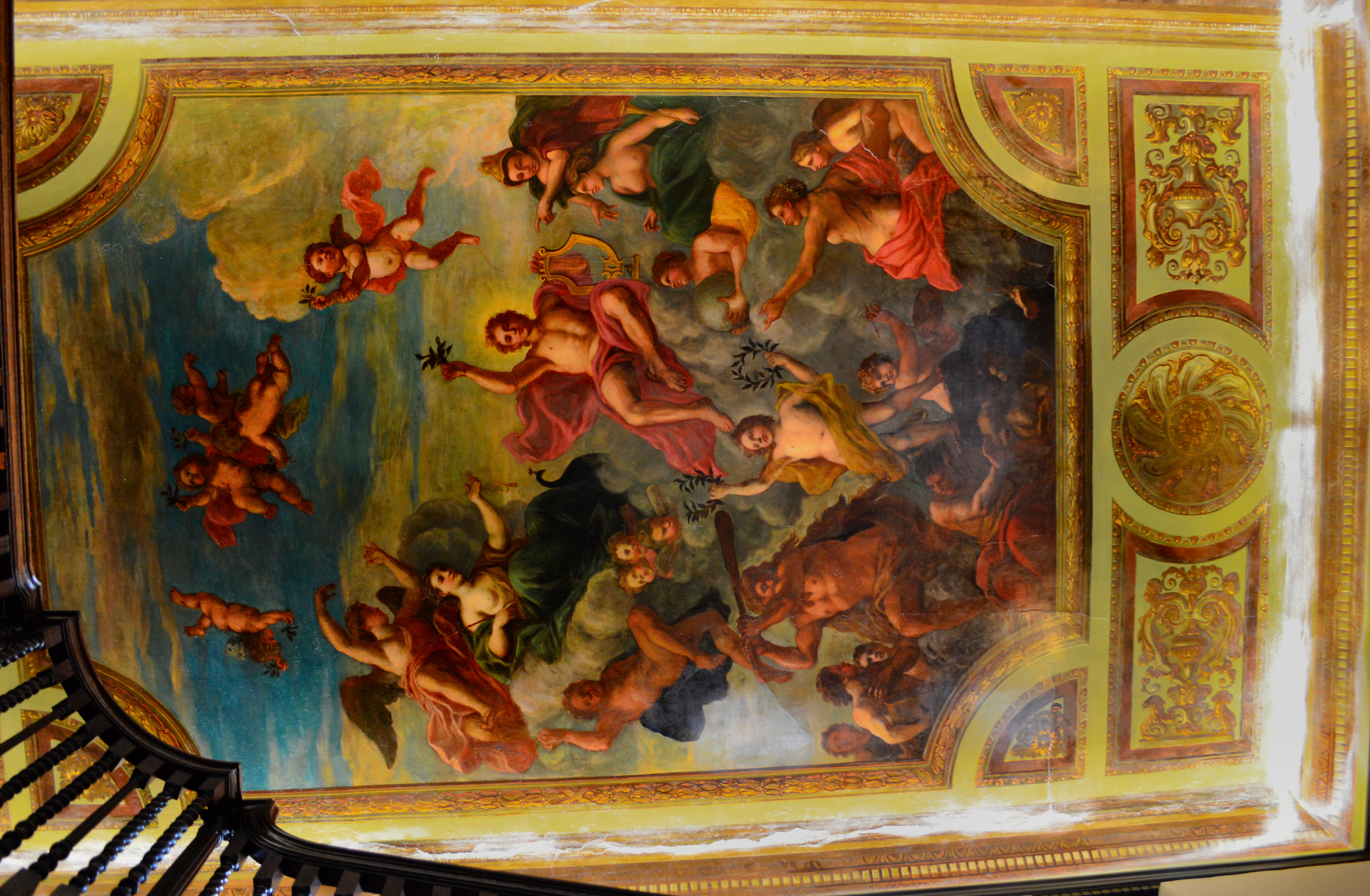
The Assembly of the Gods by Louis Laguerre
